= Snow (disambiguation) =

Snow is precipitation in the form of crystalline water ice.

Snow may also refer to:

== Places ==
- Snow, Kentucky, an unincorporated community in the United States
- Snow, Oklahoma, an unincorporated community in the United States
- Snow Lake (disambiguation)
- Snow Mountain (disambiguation), various mountains in the United States
- Snow Peak (disambiguation)
- Mount Snow, a ski area in the U.S. state of Vermont
- Snow Island (South Shetland Islands), Antarctica
- Snow rural council, a subdivision of Nyasvizh district, Minsk region, Belarus
  - Snow (agrotown), populated place in Belarus, center of the Snow rural council

== People ==
- Snow (surname), a list of people with the surname Snow or Snowe
- Arthur Owens (1899–1957), British WWII double agent codenamed SNOW
- Snow (musician) (born 1969), real name Darrin O'Brien, Canadian reggae musician
- Snow Badua (born 1977), real name Edmund Pineda Badua, Filipino sports journalist
- Snow Bowman (1915–1992), real name Albert William Bowman, rugby union player from New Zealand
- Snow P. Freeman (1805–1862), Canadian lawyer and political figure from Nova Scotia
- Snow Parker (1760–1843), Canadian merchant, judge, and political figure from Nova Scotia
- Snow Pendleton (1818–1888), real name Frederick Henry Snow Pendleton, Victorian Era priest in the Church of England
- Snow Urbin, real name Snejana Urbin, Russian female dancer and choreographer

== Arts, media and entertainment ==
=== Films ===
- Snow (1963 film), a UK documentary short by Geoffrey Jones
- Snow: The Movie, a 1982 Australian comedy
- Snow (2004 film), a Christmas-themed American television film
- Snow (2008 film), a Bosnian film by Aida Begić
- Snow (2015 film), a Bulgarian film

=== Literature ===
- Snow (comics), a 2006 English-language manga by Morgan Luthi
- Snow (picture book), a 1998 picture book by Uri Shulevitz
- "Snow" (poem), a 1936 poem by Mao Zedong
- Snow (Malfi novel), a 2010 novel by Ronald Malfi
- Snow (Pamuk novel), a 2002 novel by Orhan Pamuk
- The Snow (novel), a 2004 science fiction novel by Adam Roberts
- "Snow" (Beattie short story), a 1986 story by Ann Beattie
- "Snow" (Butler short story), a 1991 story by Robert Olen Butler
- "Snow" (Crowley short story), a 1985 story by John Crowley
- "Snow" (Jackson short story), a 2014 story by Shelley Jackson

=== Music ===
==== Bands ====
- The Snow (band), a New York rock band
- Snowing (band), an American emo band

==== Albums ====
- Snow (Angus & Julia Stone album) or title (see below; 2017)
- Snow (Curt Kirkwood album) or title (2005)
- Snow (The New Year album) or title (2017)
- Snow (Spock's Beard album) (2002)
- Snow (EP), a 1993 EP by the Cocteau Twins

==== Songs and compositions ====
- "Snow" (Angus & Julia Stone song), the title song of the album Snow, 2017
- "Snow (Hey Oh)", a 2006 song by the Red Hot Chili Peppers
- "The Snow" (song), a 1991 song by Coil
- "Snow", a song by JJ72 from the album, JJ72
- "Snow", a song written by Irving Berlin that appears on the soundtrack of the 1954 film, White Christmas
- "Snow", a classical song composed by Ivor Gurney
- "The Snow", an 1894 part-song composed by Edward Elgar

=== Video games ===
- Snow (visual novel), a 2003 Japanese adult visual novel
- Snow (2019 video game), a 2019 skiing and snowboarding video game

=== Characters ===
- Chrissy Snow, a female character on the TV show Three's Company, played by Suzanne Somers
- Snow, a gang member in the 1979 film The Warriors
- Mr. Snow, a character and the protagonist of the children's book series by Roger Hargreaves, Mr. Men
- President Coriolanus Snow, a character in The Hunger Games trilogy and related media
- Jon Snow (character), a character in the novel series A Song of Ice and Fire by George R. R. Martin, and in the adapted TV series Game of Thrones
- Snow Villiers, one of the male protagonists of the video game, Final Fantasy XIII
- Marion Snow, a character in the 2012 sci-fi/action film Lockout
- Snow Miku, a winter-themed Hatsune Miku character introduced in 2010, whose design underwent minor changes in 2011 and substantial annual revisions from 2012 onward

=== Television ===
- "Snow", an episode of the 1987 TV series Beauty and the Beast
- "Snow", an episode of Peppa Pig
- "Snow", an episode of United States of Tara
- "Snow", an episode of Ben & Holly's Little Kingdom

== Other uses ==
- SNOW, a stream cipher
- Snow (app), an image messaging and multimedia mobile application
- Snow (beer), a brand of beer in China
- Snow (dessert), two types of dessert
- Snow (ship), a type of two-masted sailing vessel
- Snow, a codec originating from the FFmpeg project
- Snow College, Ephraim, Utah, U.S.
- Snowflake Inc., an American cloud computing provider with stock ticker SNOW
- Visual snow syndrome, a medical condition with flickering dots across the visual field

== Other common meanings ==
- Cocaine, a narcotic also known as snow
- Noise (video) or snow, white noise on an analog video or television display

== See also ==
- Thundersnow
- Marine snow
- Snowball (disambiguation)
- Snowfall (disambiguation)
- Snowflake (disambiguation)
- Snowstorm (disambiguation)
- Big Snow (disambiguation)
- Snow White (disambiguation)
