= Blizzard (disambiguation) =

A blizzard is a severe winter storm condition characterized by low temperatures, strong winds, and heavy snow.

Blizzard or The Blizzard may also refer to:

== Arts and entertainment ==
=== Fictional characters ===
- Blizzard (Marvel Comics), primarily foes of Iron Man
- Minister Blizzard, a DC Comics villain, commonly a recurring foe of Wonder Woman
- Blizzard (G.I. Joe)
- Blizzard, from the crime film The Penalty
- Hellish Blizzard, a character from the manga series One-Punch Man

=== Films ===
- Blizzard (1944 film), a Swedish drama film
- Blizzard (2003 film), directed by LeVar Burton
- The Blizzard (1921 film), starring Oliver Hardy
- The Blizzard (1923 film), a Swedish drama based on the Selma Lagerlof novel
- The Blizzard (1964 film), a Soviet film based on the short story by Pushkin

=== Music ===
- The Blizzards, a rock band from Ireland
- The Blizzard (DJ), a Norwegian trance duo from Norway, currently based in Oslo.
- Blizzard (EP), a 2013 EP by Fauve
- Blizzards (album), a 2020 album by Nathan Fake
- "The Blizzard" (song), a song by Jim Reeves
- "The Blizzard", a song by Camera Obscura

=== Other arts and entertainment ===
- "The Blizzard", a 1831 short story by Aleksandr Pushkin
- "The Blizzard", a 1985 episode of the sitcom Night Court
- "The Blizzard", a 1999 episode of the children's animated series Arthur

== In business ==
- Blizzard Entertainment, a video game subsidiary of Activision Blizzard, Inc.
- Blizzard Ski, an Austrian ski manufacturer
- Blizzard Sport, an Austrian sports equipment company
- Dairy Queen Blizzard, an ice cream product

== Sports teams ==
=== Canada ===
- Barrie Blizzard, a defunct lacrosse team based in Barrie, Ontario
- Edmundston Blizzard, a junior ice hockey team from Edmundston, New Brunswick
- Manitoba Blizzard, a box lacrosse team based in Winnipeg, Manitoba
- OCN Blizzard, a junior ice hockey team from The Pas, Manitoba
- The Blizzard, original name of the Sorel-Tracy Éperviers, a hockey team based in Sorel-Tracy, Quebec
- Toronto Blizzard (1971–1984), a defunct soccer organization
- Toronto Blizzard (1986–1993), a defunct soccer organization

=== United States ===
- Alexandria Blizzard, a junior ice hockey team based in Alexandria, Minnesota
- Buffalo Blizzard, a soccer club that existed from 1992 to 2001 in Buffalo, New York
- Colorado Springs Blizzard, an American soccer team
- New England Blizzard (1996–1998), a defunct professional women's basketball organization
- Taos Blizzard, a defunct baseball team based in Taos, New Mexico
- Utica Blizzard, a defunct ice hockey team based in Utica, New York

== Other uses ==
- Buran (spacecraft), a Soviet space shuttle
- Blizzard (surname), a surname
- Blizzard PPC, a PowerUP accelerator PowerPC-based upgrade card for the Amiga
- Blizzard! The Storm That Changed America, a children's history book by Jim Murphy
- The Blizzard (magazine), a British football magazine
- Toyota Blizzard, a four-wheel-drive vehicle manufactured from 1980 into the 1990s

== See also ==
- Toronto Blizzard (disambiguation)
- Cuby & the Blizzards, a Dutch blues group
- Nor'easter
- Thundersnow
- Big Snow (disambiguation)
- Snowstorm (disambiguation)
- Winter storm (disambiguation)
