= Winterkill =

Type of winter that kills plants and animals

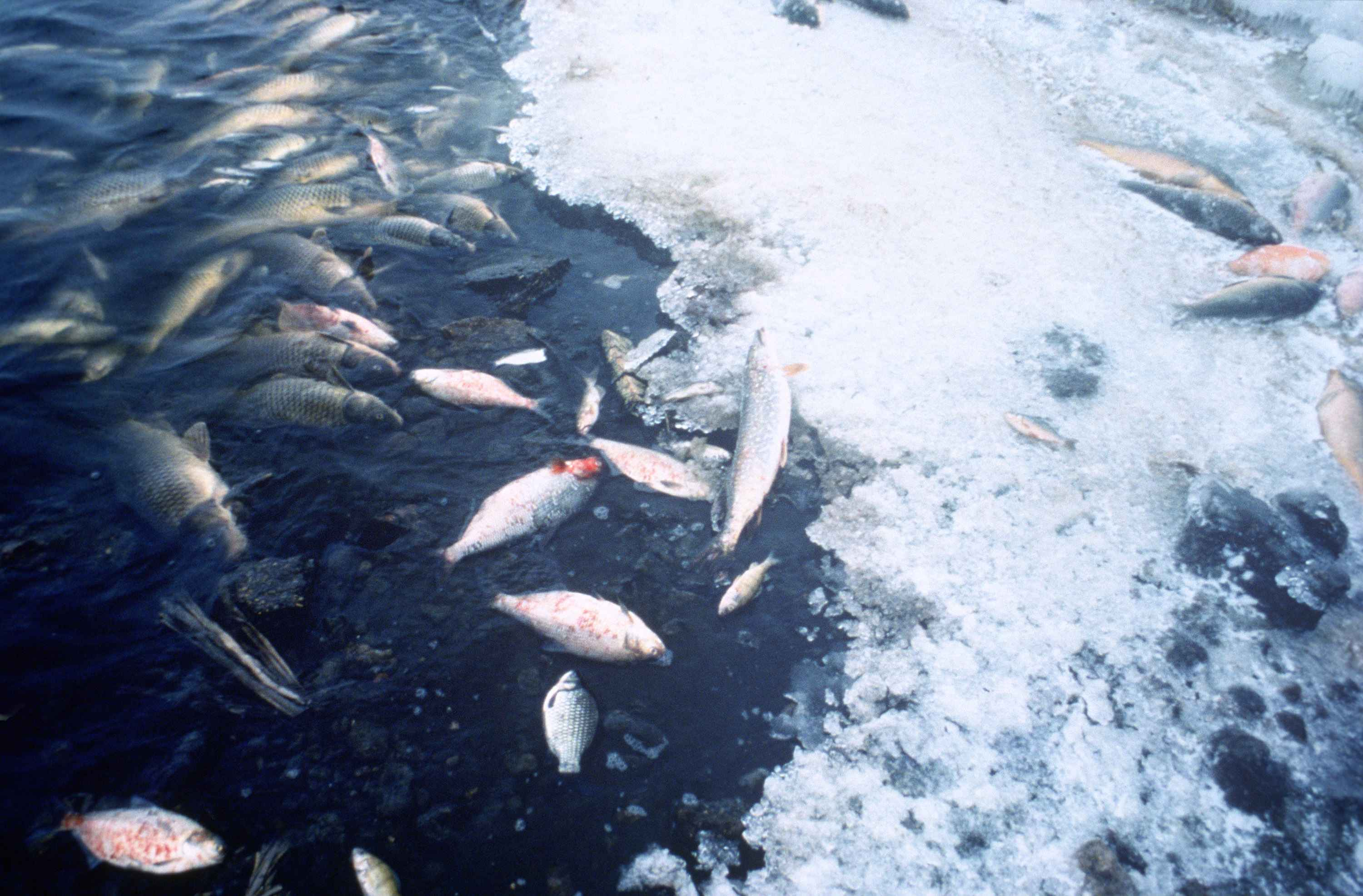
Fish kill, from oxygen depletion caused by a winterkill

Winterkill happens in frigid and icy winters, its effect can kill both plants and animals. In lakes, the winterkill kills fish when the dissolved oxygen is too low due to the cold. The drop in dissolved oxygen occurs when the lake is too shallow, has insufficient inlet water, and/or the top ice is too thick. Water aeration is one way to help prevent winterkill in lakes and ponds.

Winterkill of turfgrasses and crops can happen in winter due to very low temperatures. Winterkill can also bring on the drying out of turfgrasses/crops, with killing due to desiccation. With a layer of snow, turfgrasses/crops can be protected from desiccation. The other winterkill of turfgrasses/crops is crown hydration (cycles of freezing and thawing).

Very cold winters can cause winterkill in deer, elk, and pronghorn. Due to the smaller body size of fawns, they are more susceptible to winterkill. Very cold, a thick ice layer or deep snow winters can reduce herd populations. A late spring can also cause winterkill.

== See also ==
- Cold wave
- Lake-effect snow
- Whiteout (weather)
- Blowing snow advisory
- Blowing snow
