= Snow cap =

Snow cap or snowcap may refer to:

== Geography ==
- Ice cap, a region capped by ice
- Snowfield capping mountains
- Polar cap capping the poles

=== Places ===
- Snowcap Creek, a tributary of the Lillooet River, British Columbia, Canada; see List of tributaries of the Fraser River
- Snow Cap, Großer Arber, Germany; an air operations center radar station of the German Air Force

=== Fictional locations ===
- Snowcap Base, a fictional location in the Whoniverse, from the Doctor Who serial The Tenth Planet

== Biology ==
- SNO-Cap (S-Nitrosocaptopril), a nitrovasodilator
- Snowcap, a large white area of coloration in horses from the coat patterns of the leopard complex
- snow-capped manakin (Lepidothrix nattereri), a bird
- snowcap (Microchera albocoronata), a hummingbird
- Snowcap, a Sativa-dominant hybrid strain of marijuana, see List of names for cannabis strains

== Products ==
- Sno-Caps, a brand of candy
- SnowCaps (Glutathione), a skin whitening product containing glutathione

== Businesses and companies ==
- SNOCAP, a content control technology company
- MHS Aviation (Germany) (ICAO airline code: MHV; IATA airline code: M2; callsign: SNOWCAP) German charter airline
- Snowcap Inn, Newry, Maine, USA; a hotel at the Sunday River (ski resort)

== Other uses ==
- Operation Snowcap (1987-1994) a U.S. counter-narcotics trafficking program
- Snowcaps (song), a 1999 song by Unwed Sailor
- Snow Cap (story) by Matthew S. Armstrong from the graphic novel anthology Flight, see List of volumes of Flight

== See also ==
- Frost line (disambiguation)
- Snow Peak (disambiguation)
- Icecap (disambiguation)
- Snow (disambiguation)
- Cap (disambiguation)
