= Snow Peak =

Snow Peak or snowpeak may refer to:

== Places ==
- the English name for Piton des Neiges, a volcano on Réunion
- Snow Peak (Alberta), Canada; a mountain
- Snow Peak (Antarctica); a mountain
- Snow Peak Wildlife Management Area, Idaho, USA
- Snow Peak (Oregon), a summit in the Cascade Range southwest of Salem and east of Lebanon

== Other uses ==
- A snow field capped mountain
- Snow cornice
- Snow Peak (company) a Japanese company that sells lightweight camping and hiking equipment

== See also ==
- Snow Mountain
- Mount Snow
- Glacial maximum
- Icepeak (disambiguation)
- Snow cap (disambiguation)
- Snow (disambiguation)
