= Snow squall warning =

Weather warning for short-term bursts of blowing snow affecting visibility

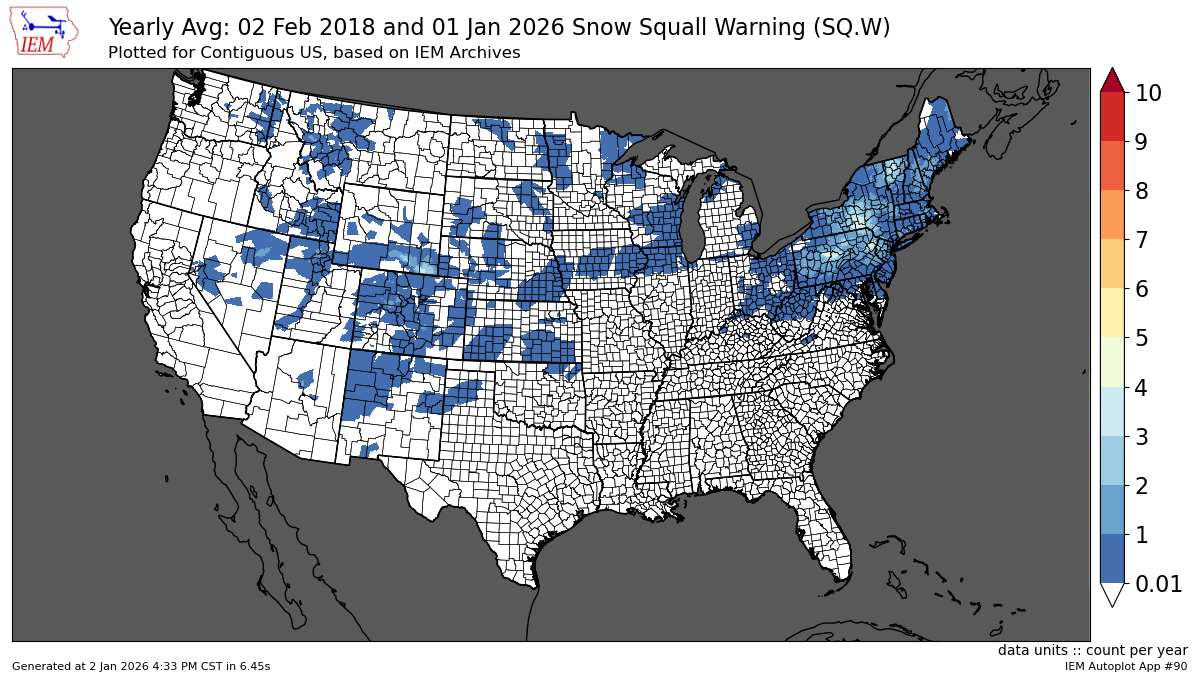
Map of average annual snow squall warnings in the United States between 2018 and 2026.

A snow squall warning (SAME code: SQW) is a bulletin issued by Environment Canada's Meteorological Service of Canada and the National Weather Service in the United States to warn population of two types of snow events reducing visibility in blowing snow: lake effect snow squalls and frontal snow squalls.

== Phenomenon ==
Lake effect snow squalls are generated by cold arctic air moving over unfrozen water of lake or sea. These will reduce visibility to less than 1 km and produce large accumulations of snow on the ground along narrow corridors in lee of the waters. Duration of these events can extend for days.

Frontal snow squalls are associated with a fast moving intense cold front in winter. Visibility must be reduce to less than 500 m, wind over 40 km/h with a wind shift. Quantities of snow is not important with this type but intensity is heavy for a short period, typically 10 to 20 minutes.

== Criteria ==
Squall warnings, reduce visibility

=== Canada ===
In Canada, snow squall warnings are issued for conditions expected to be:

- Heavy snow off an open body of water producing at least 15 cm accumulations per 12 hours and reducing visibility to less than 400 meters over a limited region.
- Line of convective snow showers, associated with a cold front, reducing suddenly and for a short period the visibility in snow and blowing snow, causing difficult road conditions.

=== United States ===
Beginning November 1, 2018, the snow squall warning was declared operational in the United States, and the capability to issue these warnings was rolled out to all NWS offices in the US. These issuances are intended to warn drivers of potentially life-threatening road conditions. The warnings are issued in a polygon area, to make the warned area as localized as possible, similar to a tornado, severe thunderstorm, or flash flood warning.

Criteria for the National Weather Service to issue a snow squall warning include:

- Visibility of less than one quarter of a mile
- Sub-freezing temperatures on the ground
- Expected to last in one area less than 60 minutes
- Cause dangerous and life-threatening conditions

In the winter season of 2023-2024, the National Weather Service started using Impact-Based Warnings for snow squall warnings. Previously, all snow squall warnings would prompt a Wireless Emergency Alert. However, only warnings tagged 'Significant' will trigger an alert, while 'General' warnings, those without an impact tag, will not.

== US Example ==
Snow Squall Warning for Northeastern Minnesota
An example of a snow squall warning being issued Northeastern Minnesota counties on 17 December 2023 at 8:59 PM CST.

The following is an example of a snow squall warning issued by the US National Weather Service in Binghamton, New York, on February 2, 2018.

148
WWUS51 KBGM 021452
SQWBGM

BULLETIN - IMMEDIATE BROADCAST REQUESTED
Snow Squall Warning
National Weather Service Binghamton NY
950 AM EST Fri Feb 2 2018

NYC007-017-023-053-077-107-109-021545-
/O.NEW.KBGM.SQ.W.0002.180202T1450Z-180202T1545Z/
Otsego NY-Broome NY-Madison NY-Cortland NY-Tioga NY-Tompkins NY-
Chenango NY-
950 AM EST Fri Feb 2 2018

The National Weather Service in Binghamton has issued a

* Snow Squall Warning for...
  Central Otsego County in central New York...
  Northwestern Broome County in central New York...
  Southern Madison County in central New York...
  Cortland County in central New York...
  Tioga County in central New York...
  Tompkins County in central New York...
  Chenango County in central New York...

* Until 1045 AM EST.
* At 950 AM EST, a dangerous snow squall was located along a line
  extending from near Exeter Center to near Poolville to near
  Erieville to near Cuyler to East Homer to near Groton to Enfield,
  moving southeast at 25 mph.

  HAZARD...Extremely poor visibility in heavy snow. A quick 1 to 2
           inches of snow could fall in less than an hour.

  SOURCE...Radar indicated.

  IMPACT...Dangerous life-threatening travel.

This snow squall will be near...
  Hamilton and Georgetown around 955 AM EST.
  Lebanon and Otselic around 1000 AM EST.
  Hartwick and South Lebanon around 1005 AM EST.
  Cooperstown and South Brookfield around 1010 AM EST.
  Danby, Virgil and Columbus around 1015 AM EST.
  Caroline, Harford and Smyrna around 1020 AM EST.
  Marathon, Edmeston and Plymouth around 1025 AM EST.
  North Norwich, Pittsfield and Cincinnatus around 1030 AM EST.

This includes the following highway exits...
 New York Interstate 81 between 7 and 12.
 Interstate 86/Route 17 between 63 and 65.
 Interstate 88 between 15 and 18.

PRECAUTIONARY/PREPAREDNESS ACTIONS...

Reduce your speed and turn on headlights! During snow squalls, the
visibility may suddenly drop to near zero in whiteout conditions.

&&

LAT...LON 4252 7472 4251 7484 4248 7496 4245 7498
      4245 7522 4238 7549 4228 7565 4200 7631
      4220 7654 4228 7654 4229 7662 4236 7669
      4243 7669 4266 7614 4276 7599 4283 7572
      4283 7545 4275 7499 4255 7469
TIME...MOT...LOC 1450Z 315DEG 20KT 4275 7507 4282 7543 4281 7570 4275
7597 4265 7612 4256 7638 4244 7664

$$

== See also ==
- Severe weather terminology (Canada)
- Snowsquall
- Lake effect snow
- Lake effect snow warning
