= Snowfall (disambiguation) =

Snowfall is a form of precipitation.

Snowfall may also refer to:

== Books and comics ==
- Snowfall, a 1994 romantic novel by K. M. Peyton
- Snowfall (comics), a fictional character in Marvel Comics
- Snowfall Trilogy, a series of fantasy novels by Mitchell Smith, or the first novel in the series
- Queen Snowfall, a fictional character in the novel series Wings of Fire

== Music ==
- Snowfall: The Tony Bennett Christmas Album, a 1968 album by Tony Bennett
- Snowfall (Yanni album), a 2000 compilation album
- Snowfall, a 2007 album by The Four Freshmen
- Snowfalls (album), debut solo album by Brian Keane 1986
- "Snowfall", a 1941 song written by Claude Thornhill
- "Snowfalls" (song), a song by t.A.T.u.
- "Snowfall", a 2008 song by God Is an Astronaut from their self-titled album
- "Snowfall" (song), a 2022 song by Øneheart and Reidenshi

== Other ==
- "Snow Fall", a 2012 multimedia narrative on a deadly avalanche in Washington State by The New York Times
- "Snow Falls" (Once Upon a Time), an episode of the TV series Once Upon a Time
- Snow Falls (film), a 2023 American horror film
- Snowfall, a 1974 Hungarian film directed by Ferenc Kósa
- Snowfall Limited, a Swedish founded, UK based corporate travel management company
- Snowfall (TV series), an American television drama series
- Snowfall (horse), Thoroughbred racehorse
- Snowfall, the second expansion park for the city building game Cities: Skylines

== See also ==
- Northeast Snowfall Impact Scale
  - List of Northeast Snowfall Impact Scale winter storms
- Snow (disambiguation)
- Fall (disambiguation)
- Snowstorm (disambiguation)
