= Snow squall =

Sudden heavy snowfall accompanied with strong winds

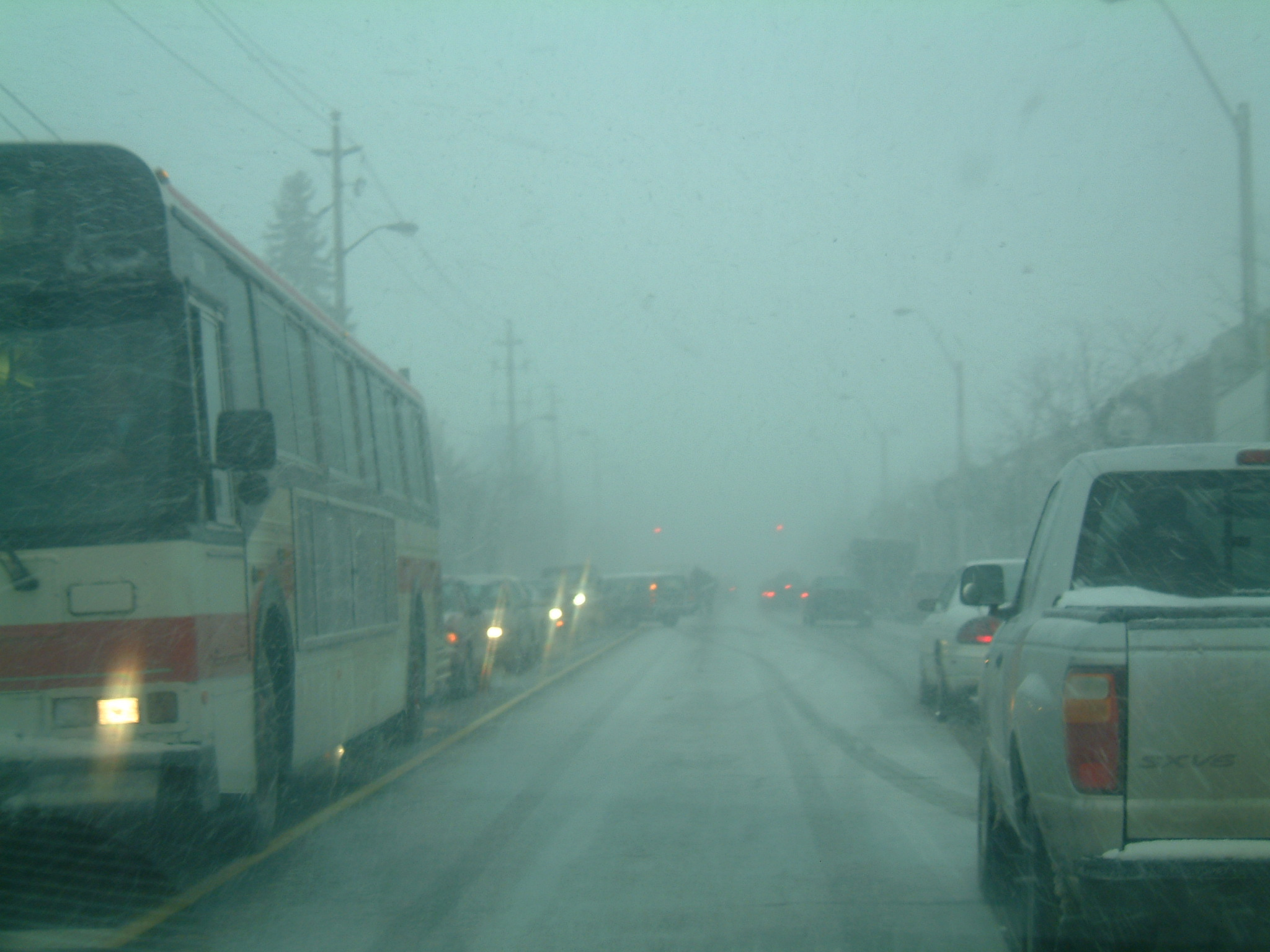
A hybrid Frontal-Lake Effect Snowsquall hitting Toronto, Canada during rush hour.

A snow squall, or snowsquall, is a sudden moderately heavy snowfall with blowing snow and strong, gusty surface winds. It is often referred to as a whiteout and is similar to a blizzard but is localized in time or in location and snow accumulations may or may not be significant.

== Types ==
There are two primary types of snow squalls: lake effect and frontal. Both types can strongly reduce visibilities and sometimes produce heavy snowfall.

=== Lake-effect snow ===
When arctic air moves over large expanses of warmer open waters in winter, convective clouds develop which cause heavy snow showers due to the large amount of moisture available. This occurs southwest of extratropical cyclones, with the curved cyclonic wind flow bringing cold air across the relatively warm Great Lakes which then leads to narrow lake-effect snow bands that can produce significant localized snowfall. Whiteout conditions will affect narrow corridors from shores to inland areas aligned along the prevailing wind direction. This will be enhanced when the moving air mass is uplifted by higher elevations. The name originates from the Great Lakes area of North America, however any body of water can produce them. Regions in lee of oceans, such as the Canadian Maritimes could experience such snow squalls.

The areas affected by lake-effect snow are called snowbelts and deposition rate of many inches (centimetres) of snow per hour are common in these situations. In order for lake-effect snow to form, the temperature difference between the water and 850 millibars (850 hPa) should be at least 23 °F (13 °C), surface temperature be around the freezing mark, the lake unfrozen, the path over the lake at least 100 kilometres (62 mi) and the directional wind shear with height should be less than 30° from the surface to 850 millibars (850 hPa). Extremely cold air over still warm water in early winter can even produce thundersnow, snow showers accompanied by lightning and thunder.

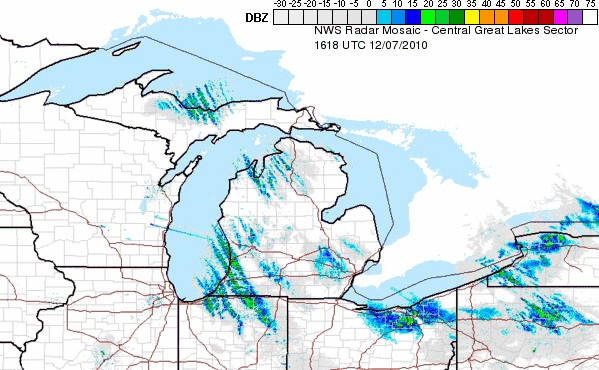
Radar trace of lake-effect snow squalls off the Great Lakes from US radars.

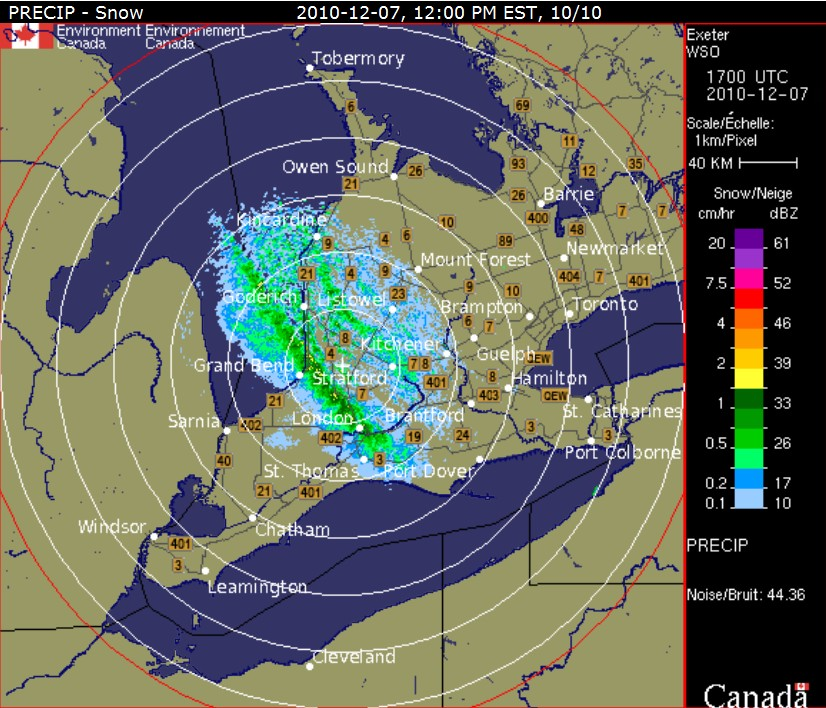
Radar image of a strong snow squall off Lake Huron in December 2010. Over 150 cm of snow from this squall, fell north of London, Ontario.

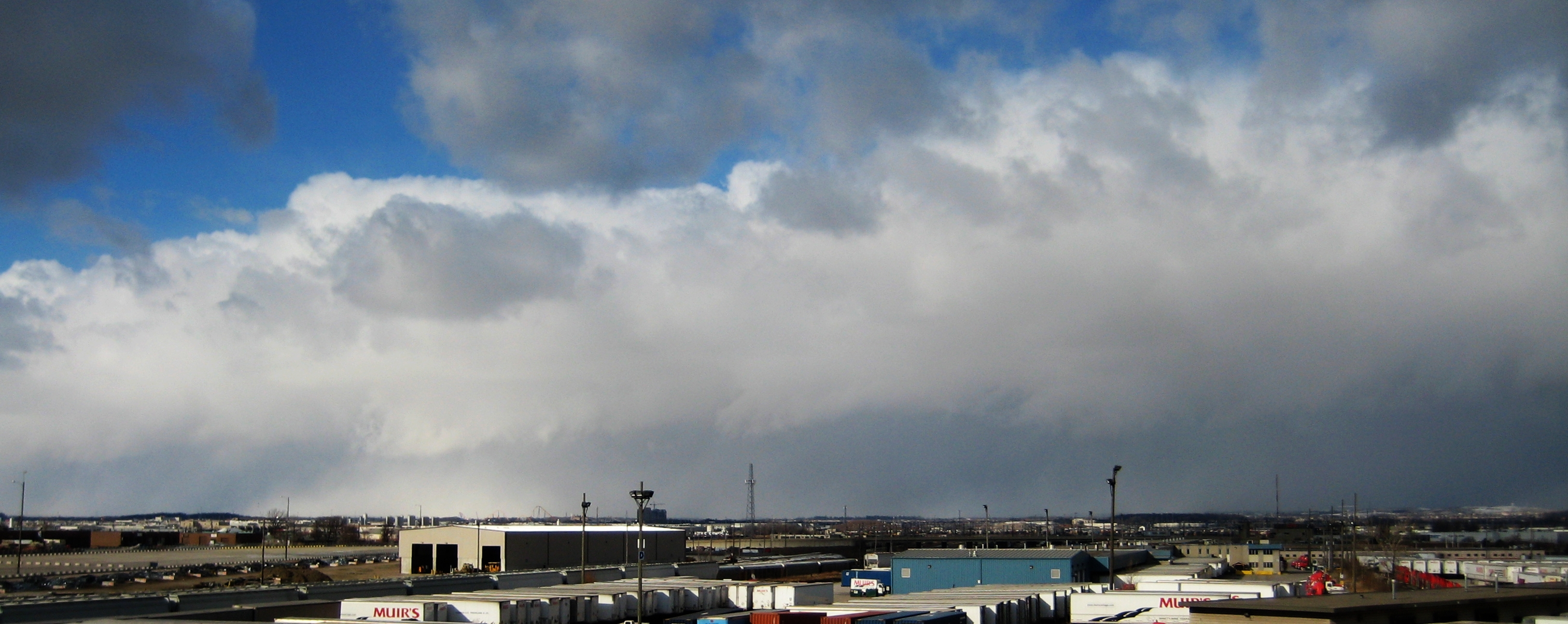
A linear single banded snow squall over Southern Ontario

=== Frontal snow squall ===
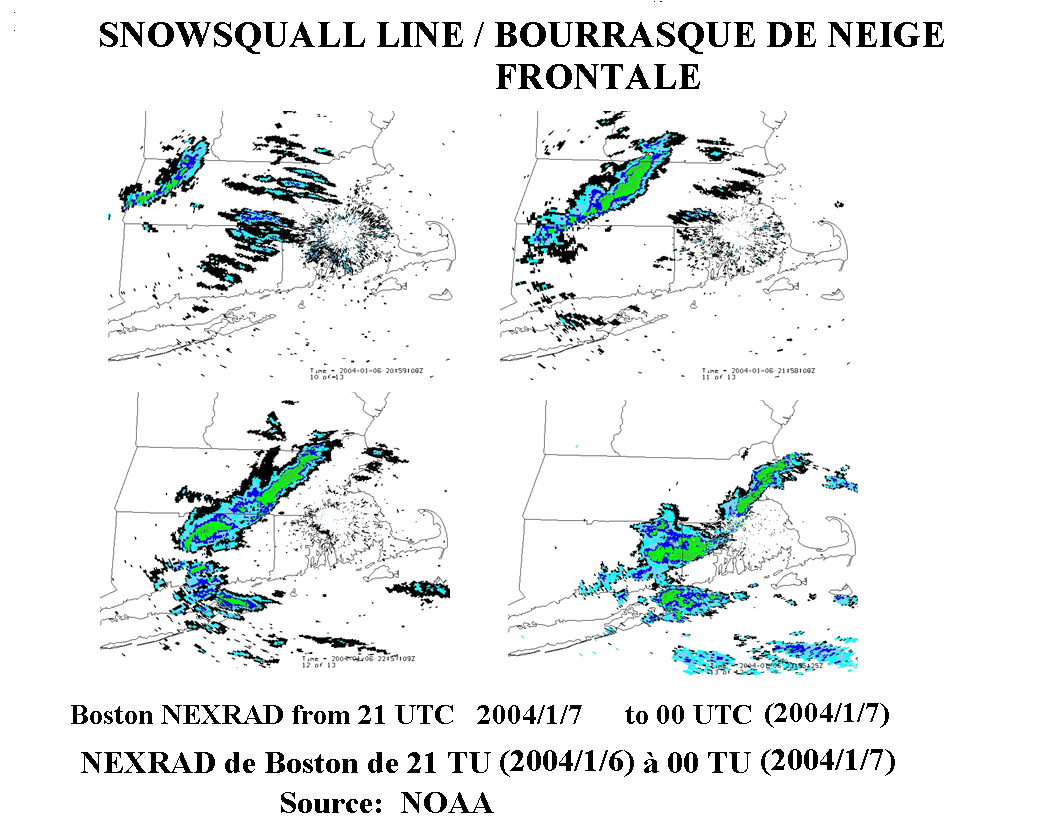
Frontal snow squall moving toward Boston, Massachusetts, United States

A frontal snow squall is an intense frontal convective line (similar to a squall line), when temperature is near freezing at the surface. The strong convection that develops has enough moisture to produce whiteout conditions at places which line passes over as the wind causes intense blowing snow. This type of snow squall generally lasts less than 30 minutes at any point along its path but the motion of the line can cover large distances. Frontal squalls may form a short distance ahead of the surface cold front or behind the cold front in situations where there are other contributing factors such as dynamic lifting from a deepening low pressure system or a series of trough lines which act similar to a traditional cold frontal passage. In situations where squalls develop post-frontally it is not unusual to have two or three linear squall bands pass in rapid succession only separated by 25 miles (40 km) with each passing the same point in roughly 30 minutes apart.

This is similar to a line of thunderstorms in the summer but the tops of the clouds are only 5,000 to 10,000 feet (1,500 to 3,000 m), often difficult to see on radar. Forecasting these types of events is equivalent to summer severe weather forecast for squall lines: presence of a sharp frontal trough with wind shift and low level jet of more than 30 knots (56 km/h; 35 mph). However, the cold dome behind the trough is at 850 millibars instead of a higher level and must be at least −13 °F (−25 °C). The presence of surface moisture from bodies of water or preexisting liquid precipitation is also a significant contributing factor helping to raise the dew point temperature and saturate the boundary layer. This saturation can significantly increase the amount of convective available potential energy leading to deeper vertical growth and higher precipitable water levels increasing the volume of snow which can be produced by the squall. In cases where there is a large amount of vertical growth and mixing the squall may develop embedded cumulonimbus clouds resulting in lightning and thunder which is dubbed thundersnow.

== Dangers ==
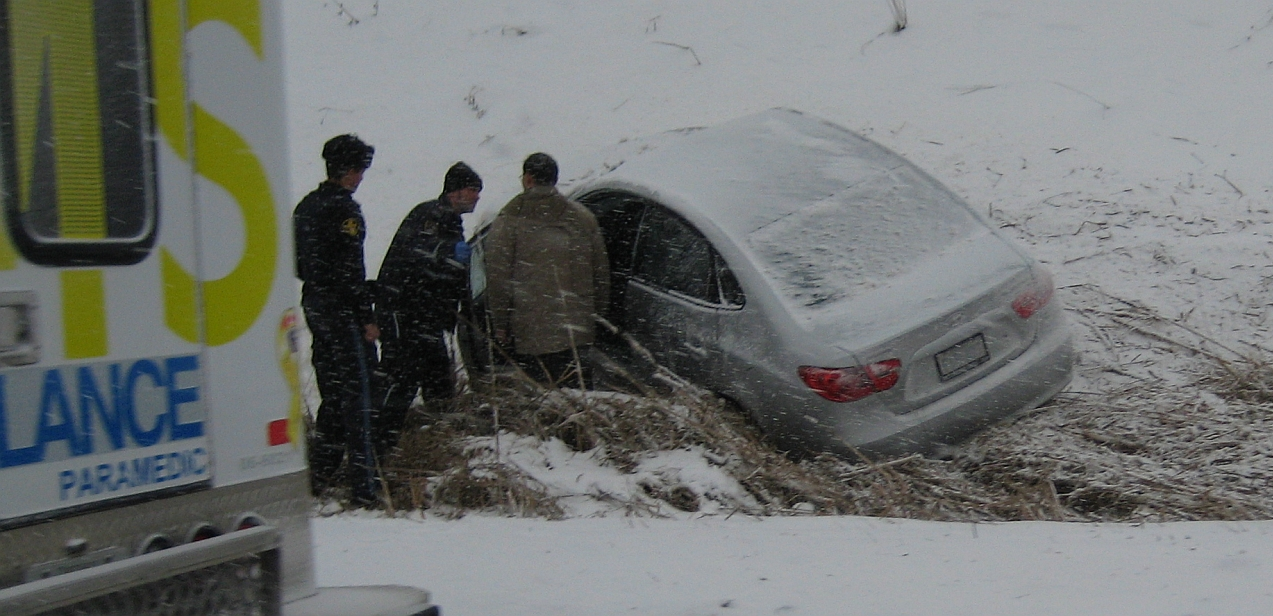
Rapidly deteriorating weather conditions during snow squalls often lead to traffic accidents.

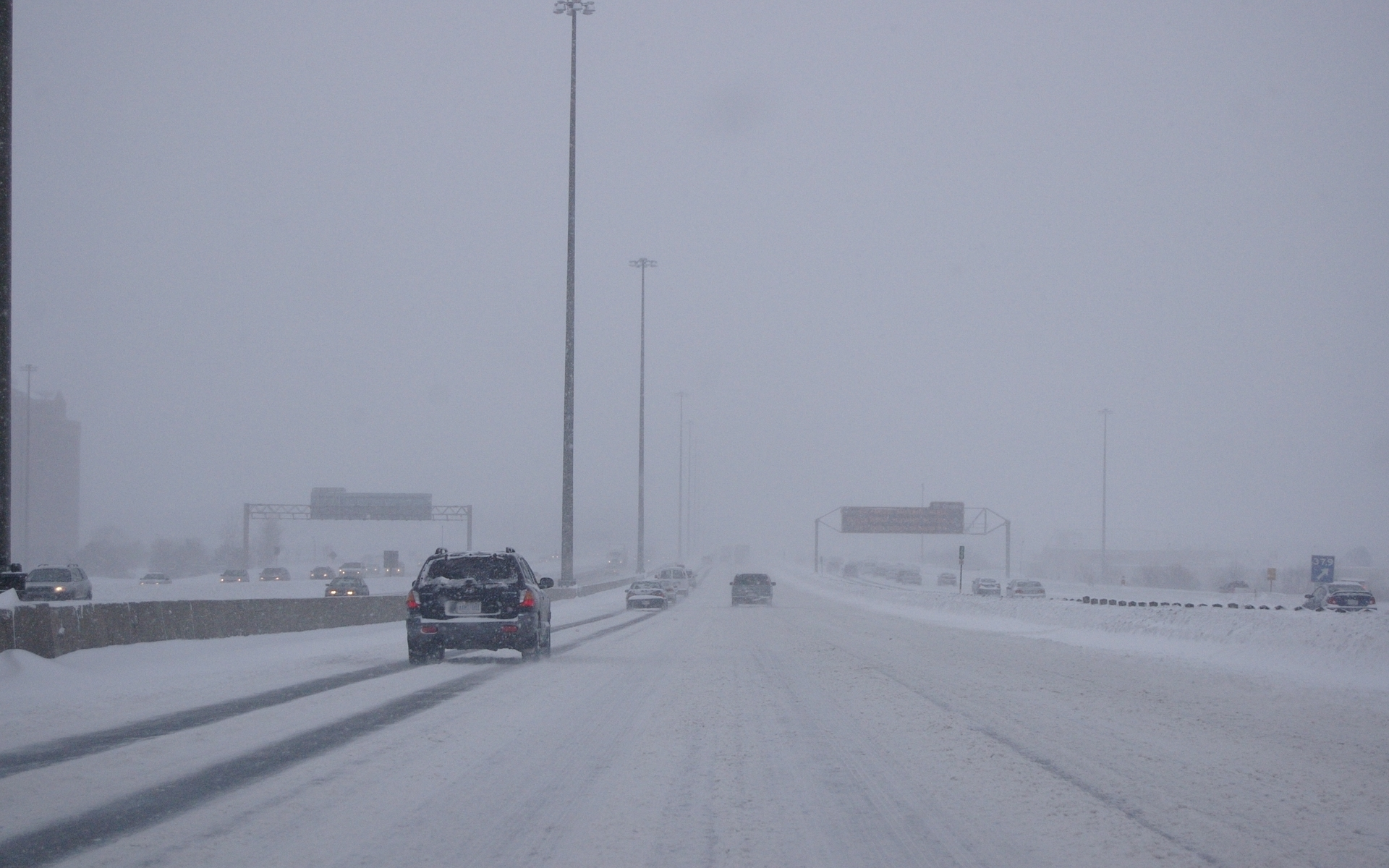
Winter conditions on Ontario Highway 401 in Toronto due to a snow squall.

Both types of snow squalls are very dangerous for motorists, airplanes, and other travelers; some can be more dangerous than blizzards. The change in conditions is very sudden, with slippery conditions and abrupt loss of visibility due to whiteouts, which often cause multiple-vehicle collisions. In the case of lake-effect snow, heavy amounts of snow can accumulate in short periods of time, possibly causing road closures and paralyzing cities. For instance, on January 9, 2015, a localized, heavy snow squall caused a 193-vehicle pile-up on I-94 highway near Galesburg, Michigan. On very rare occasions, particularly powerful snow squalls can even become supercells and form tornadoes, even if no lightning or thundersnow is present.

== See also ==
- Convection
- Snow shower

Warnings about lake-effect snow:

United States

- Lake Effect Snow Advisory
- Lake Effect Snow Warning
- Severe weather terminology (United States)
- Snow squall warning

Canada

- Snow Squall Warning
- Severe weather terminology (Canada)
