= Snow Mountain =

There are various mountains called Snow Mountain in the United States:

Name	USGS link	State	County	Coordinates	Elevation	
Snow Mountain		Arizona	Mohave	35°03′38″N 113°30′19″W	1,788 m	5,866 ft
Snow Mountain		California	Butte	40°03′54″N 121°25′17″W	2,127 m	6,978 ft
Snow Mountain		California	Humboldt	41°00′21″N 123°41′47″W	1,122 m	3,681 ft
Snow Mountain		California	Lake	39°22′53″N 122°46′22″W	1,994 m	6,542 ft
Snow Mountain East		California	Lake	39°23′01″N 122°45′07″W	2,149 m	7,051 ft
Snow Mountain West		California	Colusa	39°22′37″N 122°45′31″W	2,140 m	7,020 ft
Snow Mountain		California	Mendocino	38°56′14″N 123°12′00″W	952 m	3,123 ft
Snow Mountain		California	Placer	39°14′29″N 120°27′50″W	2,436 m	7,992 ft
Snow Mountain		California	Shasta	40°45′48″N 121°47′50″W	2,076 m	6,811 ft
Snow Mountain		Kentucky	Meade	37°53′47″N 086°00′07″W	260 m	850 ft
Snow Mountain		Massachusetts	Berkshire	42°06′45″N 073°05′30″W	462 m	1,516 ft
Snow Mountain		Massachusetts	Franklin	42°36′30″N 072°49′13″W	387 m	1,270 ft
Snow Mountain		Maine	Franklin	45°17′29″N 070°42′35″W	1,198 m	3,930 ft
Snow Mountain		Maine	Oxford	45°10′11″N 070°49′38″W	1,139 m	3,737 ft
Snow Mountain		Maine	Waldo	44°39′28″N 068°56′49″W	211 m	692 ft
Snow Mountain		Maine	Washington	45°39′29″N 067°53′30″W	220 m	720 ft
Snow Mountain		New Hampshire	Sullivan	43°34′13″N 072°10′54″W	570 m	1,870 ft
Snow Mountain		New York	Essex	44°10′06″N 073°47′38″W	720 m	2,360 ft
Snow Mountain		Oregon	Grant	43°58′14″N 119°29′46″W	2,185 m	7,169 ft
Snow Mountain		Texas	Cherokee	32°07′12″N 095°16′17″W	201 m	659 ft

== See also ==
- Snow Mountain Wilderness, California
- Mount Snow, Vermont, United States
- Snow Peak (disambiguation)
- Ice Mountain (disambiguation)
- An annual winter-long snow tubing event at Stone Mountain near Atlanta, Georgia
- Schneeberg (Alps) ("Snow Mountain" in German), a mountain in eastern Austria
- Xueshan ("Snow Mountain" in Chinese), the second highest mountain in Taiwan
