= Snowflake (disambiguation) =

A snowflake is a particle of snow.

Snowflake(s) may also refer to:

== Arts and entertainment ==
=== Film and television ===
- Snowflake (2011 film), Japanese romance and mystery film
- Snowflake (2014 film), Italian short film
- Snowflake (2017 film), German film
- Snowflake, the White Gorilla, 2011 Spanish animated live-action adventure comedy film
- "Snowflake" (Ray Donovan), a 2014 television episode

=== Music ===
- Snowflake (EP) by GFriend
- "Snowflake", a single by Kate Bush, from the album 50 Words for Snow
- Snowflakes (album) by Toni Braxton
- "Snowflake", a song by Australian singer Sia on her Everyday Is Christmas album
- "Snowflake", a single by Jim Reeves
- "Snowflakes", a single by British singer Mandy Miller
- "Snowflakes", a song by Just Jack
- "Snowflakes", a single by Canadian singer Tom MacDonald
- "Snowflakes" a song by British singer Robbie Williams on his The Christmas Present album
- "Snowflake," a song by The Hoosiers from the 2023 album Confidence

=== Characters ===
- Snoflake, a character originally meant to appear in the cancelled New Warriors comics by Marvel

== Organisms ==
- Leucojum, a genus of bulbous plants
  - Acis (plant), a genus formerly included in Leucojum
- Snowflake (gorilla), an ape
- Wrightia antidysenterica, commonly known as snowflake

== Transportation ==
- Snowflake (airline)
- HMS Snowflake (K211), a World War II Flower-class corvette

== Science and technology ==
- Koch snowflake, a mathematical curve
- Snowflake Inc. a company that provides a data cloud solution
- Snowflake schema, a term in computer database systems
- Snowflake ID, a method of generating unique identifiers used by Twitter
- Snowflake (software), a tool for the Tor network to defeat internet censorship

== Places ==
=== United States ===
- Snowflake, Arizona
- Snowflake, Virginia
- Snowflake, West Virginia
- Carlton D. Wall House, Plymouth, Michigan, also known as Snowflake

=== Elsewhere ===
- Snowflake, Manitoba, Canada
- Snowflake (prison), Russia

== Other uses ==
- Snowflake (fairy tale), a character in Russian fairy tales
- Snowflake (heraldry), a heraldic charge
- Snowflake (horse), a racehorse that was the American Champion Three-Year-Old Filly of 1930
- Snowflake (slang), a term for an overly sensitive person with an unwarranted sense of entitlement
- Snowflakes (ballet), a 1911 adaptation of the Nutcracker
- Snowflake Inc., a cloud-based data-warehousing software company
- Cadbury Snowflake, also known as Flake Snow, a discontinued chocolate bar made by Cadbury
- A type of Bobbin lace mesh

== See also ==
- Snowflake Bentley (book), a 1998 children's book by Jacqueline Briggs Martin
- Generation Snowflake, a derogatory term derived from the slang word snowflake, referring to the young adults of the 2010s who are perceived as quicker to take offence and less resilient than previous generations
- Snowflake data breach, a cybersecurity incident at Snowflake Inc. in 2024
