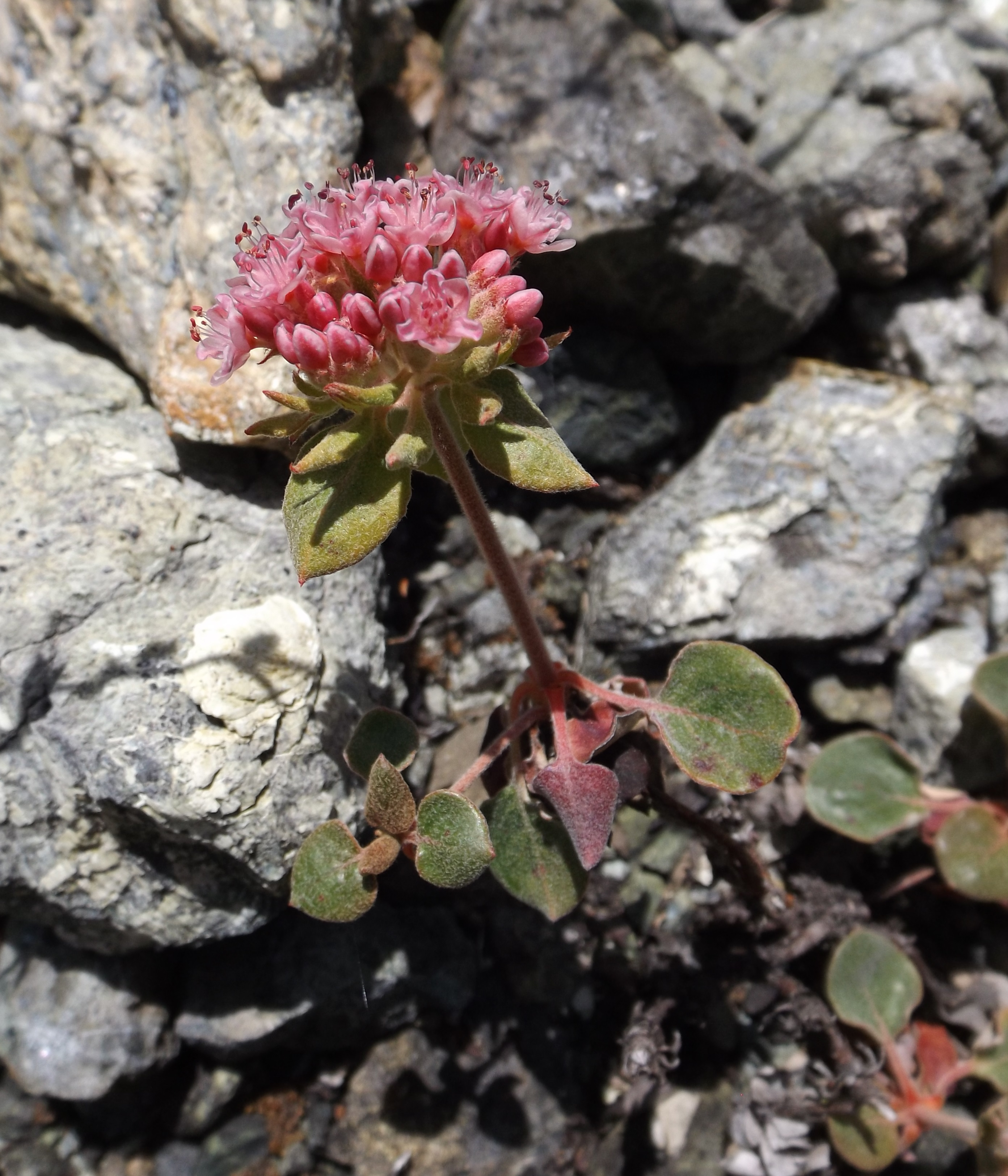

Conservation status
- Imperiled (NatureServe)

Scientific classification
- Kingdom: Plantae
- Clade: Tracheophytes
- Clade: Angiosperms
- Clade: Eudicots
- Order: Caryophyllales
- Family: Polygonaceae
- Genus: Eriogonum
- Species: E. nervulosum

Binomial name
- Eriogonum nervulosum (S.Stokes) Reveal

= Eriogonum nervulosum =

Species of wild buckwheat

Eriogonum nervulosum is a species of wild buckwheat known by the common name Snow Mountain buckwheat. This uncommon plant is endemic to the inland North Coast Ranges of California, where it is known from only a handful of occurrences, most of which are in Lake County. It is named for Snow Mountain, a local peak.

In the wild the plant grows in serpentine soils in its native mountains.

== Description ==
This is a low perennial herb forming mats of rounded leaves with woolly undersides. It produces erect inflorescences no taller than 15 centimeters, which bear rounded clusters of pale yellow to dark pink flowers.

== Cultivation ==
It is sometimes successfully cultivated in rock gardens.
