= Winter storm (disambiguation) =

A winter storm is a storm in the winter, which produces precipitation that occurs in below-zero temperatures.

Winter storm or variations may also refer to:

== Weather ==
- Winter storm watch
- Winter storm warning

== Military ==
- Operation Winter Storm (1942) a WWII German operation to breakout from the encirclement of Stalingrad
- Operation Winter Storm (1944) a WWII German and Axis offensive on the Gothic Line, see Battle of Garfagnana

== Other uses ==
- Winter Storm (album), a 2024 album by Ensiferum
- "Winterstorm", a 2002 song by Machinae Supremacy
- Winter Storms, a 1924 German film
- WinterStorm, an annual music festival in Troon, South Ayrshire, Scotland

== See also ==
- My Winter Storm (2007 album), an album by Tarja Turunen
- Northeast Snowfall Impact Scale
  - List of Northeast Snowfall Impact Scale winter storms
- Thundersnow
- Nor'easter
- Winter (disambiguation)
- Storm (disambiguation)
- Snowstorm (disambiguation)
- Blizzard (disambiguation)
- Big Snow (disambiguation)
