= Snow Lake =

Snow Lake may refer to:

== Lakes ==
Pakistan

- Snow Lake (Pakistan) or Lukpe Lawo, a glacial basin

United States

- Snow Lake (Idaho), an alpine lake
- Snow Lake (Nevada), a glacial tarn
- Snow Lake (New Mexico), a small reservoir
- Snow Lake (King County, Washington)
- Snow Lake (Mount Rainier), in Lewis County, Washington
- Snow Lakes system in the Alpine Lakes Wilderness, Chelan County, Washington

== Communities ==
- Snow Lake, Manitoba, Canada
- Snow Lake, Arkansas, United States
- Snow Lake, Indiana, United States

== Other uses ==
- Snow Lake Airport, serving Snow Lake, Manitoba
- Snow Lake Water Aerodrome, serving Snow Lake, Manitoba
- Snow Lake Peak, in Nevada
