= Icepeak =

Icepeak may refer to:

- Ice Peak, a stratovolcano in British Columbia, Canada
- Ice Peak (soft drink), a soft drink from Xi'an, China
- Ice Peak Formation, a geological formation in British Columbia, Canada
- IC3PEAK, a Russian experimental electronic band
- Icepeak, a Finnish winter sports clothing brand

== See also ==
- Glacial maximum
- Ice Mountain (disambiguation)
- Icecap (disambiguation)
