= Blizzard (surname) =

Blizzard and Blizard are surnames. Notable people with the surname include:

- Aiden Blizzard (born 1984), Australian cricketer
- Bill Blizzard (1892–1958), American labor leader
- Bob Blizzard (1950–2022), British politician
- Bobby Blizzard (born 1980), American football player
- Brett Blizzard (born 1980), Italian-American basketball player
- Christopher Blizzard, American computer scientist
- Dominic Blizzard (born 1983), English footballer
- Ed Blizzard (born 1954), American lawyer
- Everitt P. Blizard (1916–1966), Canadian-born American nuclear physicist and nuclear engineer
- George Pearce Blizard (1870–1947), British politician
- Georgia Blizzard (1919–2002), American artist
- Kevin Blizzard (1928–2004), Australian rules footballer
- Les Blizzard (1923–1996), English footballer
- Phillip Blizzard (born 1958), Australian cricketer
- Robert M. Blizzard (1924–2018), American endocrinologist
- Rohan Blizard (born 1984), Australian professional golfer
- Sara Blizzard (born 1970), English weather forecaster
- William Blizard (1743–1835), British surgeon

== See also ==
- Thomas Blizard Curling (1811–1888), 19th-century British surgeon
