= Snow Peak (Alberta) =

Mountain in Alberta, Canada

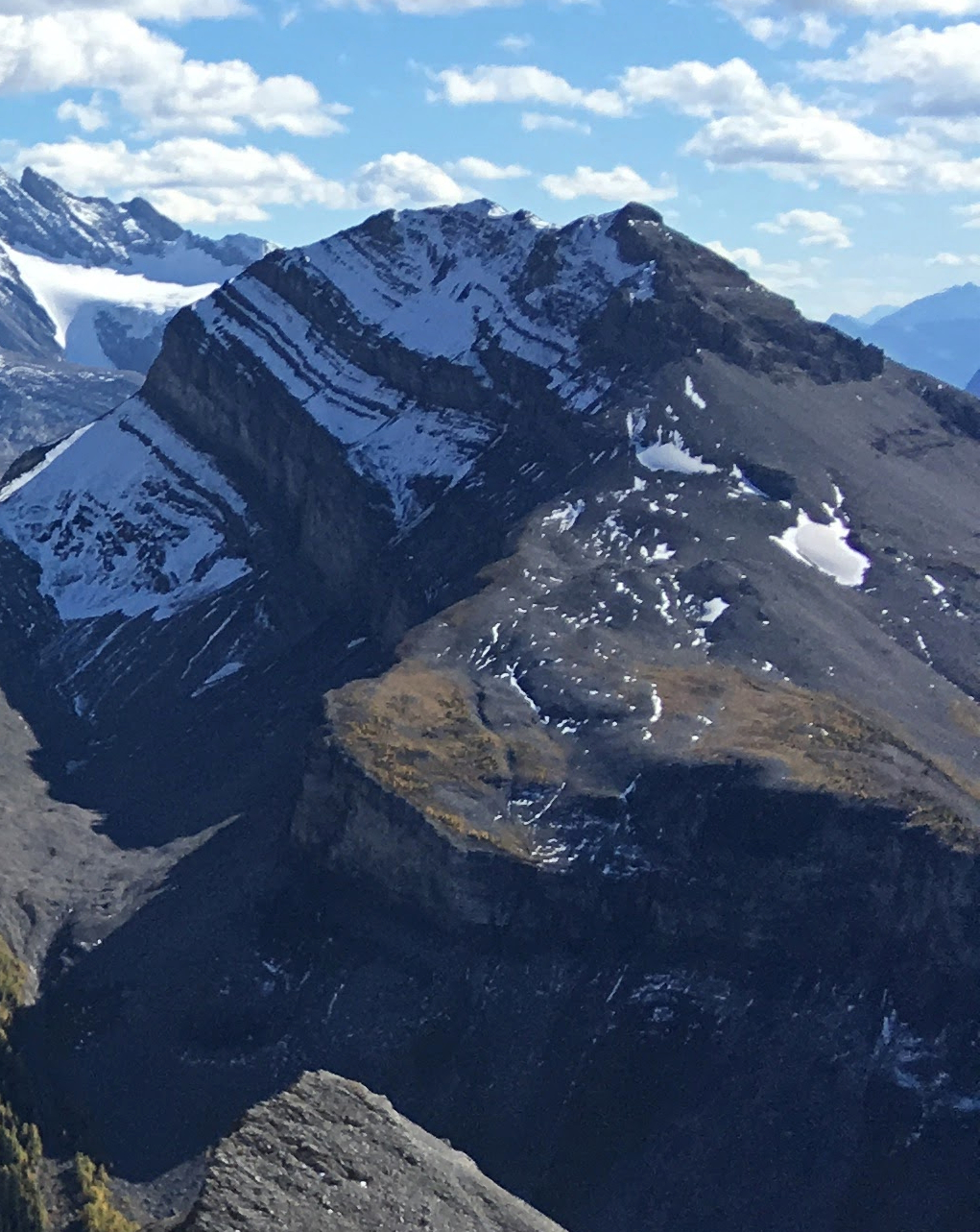
- Snow Peak seen from Smutwood Peak

Highest point
- Elevation: 2,789 m (9,150 ft)
- Prominence: 312 m (1,024 ft)
- Listing: Mountains of Alberta
- Coordinates: 50°46′21″N 115°23′09″W

Geography
- Location within Alberta Location within Canada
- Country: Canada
- Province: Alberta
- Protected areas: Banff National Park; Peter Lougheed Provincial Park
- Parent range: Spray Mountains; Canadian Rockies
- Topo map: NTS 82J14 Spray Lakes Reservoir

Climbing
- Easiest route: Scramble

Snow Peak is a 2,789-metre (9,150-foot) mountain summit in the Spray Mountains, a sub-range of the Canadian Rockies in Alberta, Canada. The mountain is situated on the shared border of Peter Lougheed Provincial Park and Banff National Park. The nearest higher peak is Mount Birdwood, 1.64 km (1.02 mi) to the northeast. The mountain is primarily used for hiking.

== Geology ==
Snow Peak is composed of sedimentary rock laid down during the Precambrian to Jurassic periods. Formed in shallow seas, this sedimentary rock was pushed east and over the top of younger rock during the Laramide orogeny.

== Climate ==
Based on the Köppen climate classification, Snow Peak is located in a subarctic climate with cold, snowy winters, and mild summers. Winter temperatures can drop below −20 °C with wind chill factors below −30 °C.

== Gallery ==
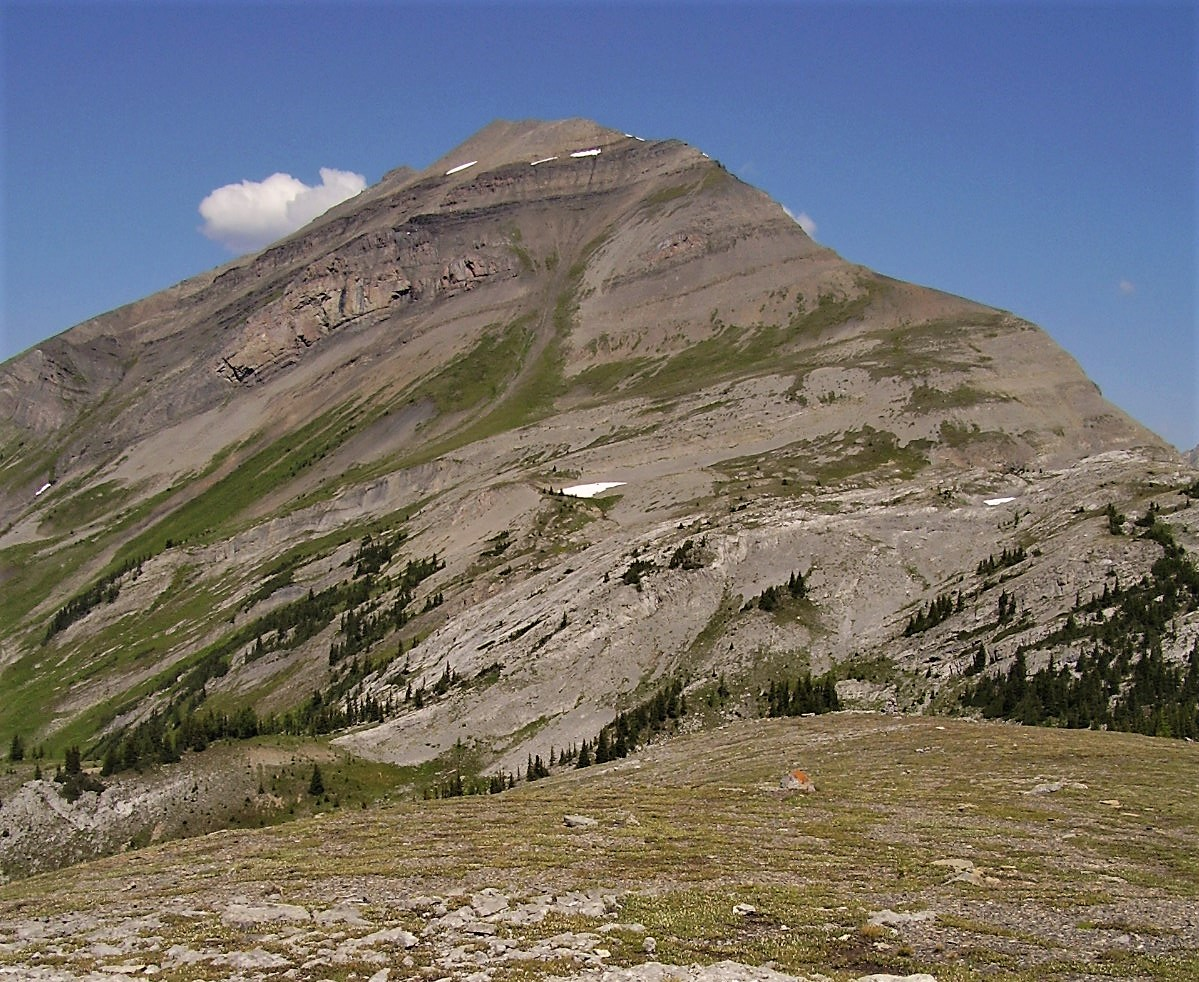
South aspect viewed from Burstall Pass
