= Blowing snow =

Snow lifted from the surface by the wind

Blowing snow is snow lifted from the surface by the wind, at eye level (1.8 m or 6 ft) or more, that will reduce visibility. Blowing snow can come from falling snow or snow that already accumulated on the ground but is picked up and blown about by strong winds. It is one of the classic requirements for a blizzard. Its METAR code is BLSN. If the snow remains below 1.8 m (6 ft), it will be called drifting snow (METAR code: DRSN). The snow which is being blown about may deposit as snowdrifts.

== Formation ==
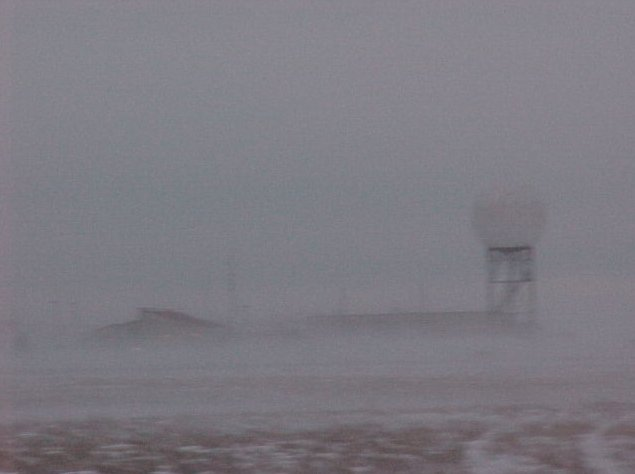
Visibility reduced in blowing snow during a ground blizzard

Blowing snow occurs in three main forms:

1. In horizontal advection conditions, the winds blow across the surface of the earth with very little if any large-scale upward motion.
2. In convection conditions, the winds exhibit large-scale upward motion lifting the snow into the atmosphere creating drifting waves of snow up to 500 m (1,600 ft) in height.
3. In thermal–mechanical mixing conditions, massive convective rolls form in the atmosphere and the blizzard may be observed from space with the blizzards convective rolls creating waves of snow (also known as snow billows) resembling lake or ocean effect snow bands. The extreme conditions can quickly bury a two-story home and make breathing very difficult if not impossible if caught outdoors.

== See also ==
- Snow squall - heavy blowing snow
- Snow flurry - lightly blowing snow
- Snow shower - abrupt snow fall, often strong and short-lived
- Blowing snow advisory
- Ground blizzard
- Severe weather terminology (Canada)
- Whiteout (weather)
