= Snow Lake (New Mexico) =

- Location within New Mexico
- Location: New Mexico
- Coordinates: 33.4226°N 108.4963°W
- Type: reservoir

Snow Lake is a small reservoir with an adjacent camping area in west central New Mexico. It is located in Gila National Forest at an elevation of 7,313 feet (2,229 m) above sea level.

== Geography ==
Snow Lake is located at 33.4226°N 108.4963°W. It is in a mountain forest habitat, with Ponderosa pines.
