= Snowstorm (disambiguation) =

A snowstorm is a weather system responsible for significant snowfall over a region.

Snowstorm may also refer to:

== Places ==
- Snowstorm, California, USA; former name of Termo, California
- Snowstorm Mountains, Elko County, Nevada, USA; a mountain range

== Literature ==
- The Snowstorm: A Christmas Story, a book by Catherine Gore
- The Snow-Storm (poem), poem by Ralph Waldo Emerson
- The Snowstorm (short story), an 1856 short story by Leo Tolstoy
- The Blizzard (aka The Snowstorm), an 1830 short story by Aleksandr Pushkin

== Music ==
- Snowstorm (band), a rock band in Gothenburg, Sweden
- "Snowstorm", a song by Galaxie 500 from their 1989 album On Fire
- "Snowstorm", a song by Wintersleep from their 2003 album Wintersleep
- Snowstorm Records, a record label featuring acts such as Chris T-T

== Other uses ==
- Buran (spacecraft), a Soviet space shuttle
- SnowStorm, a popular game on Habbo Hotel
- "Snowstorm toy", also known as snow globe
- Snow Storm: Steam-Boat off a Harbour's Mouth (painting), an 1842 artwork by British painter Joseph Mallord William Turner
- Snow Storm: Hannibal and his Army Crossing the Alps (painting), an 1812 artwork British painter Joseph Mallord William Turner
- Snowstorm (Starsky and Hutch episode), a 1975 TV episode of Starsky and Hutch
- Snow Storm (G.I. Joe), a fictional character in the G.I. Joe universe
- Snowstorm (film), a 1977 Yugoslav film directed by Antun Vrdoljak

== See also ==
- Northeast Snowfall Impact Scale
  - List of Northeast Snowfall Impact Scale winter storms
- Nor'easter
- Thundersnow
- Big Snow (disambiguation)
- Blizzard (disambiguation)
- Winter storm (disambiguation)
