= Toronto Blizzard =

Toronto Blizzard may refer to:

- Toronto Blizzard (1971–1984), the original soccer club, a franchise of the North American Soccer League
- Toronto Blizzard (1986–1993), the later club and franchise of the Canadian Soccer League
- Toronto Azzurri Blizzard, a Canadian women's semi-professional soccer club
- North American blizzard of 1999, when the Canadian army was called into Toronto to clear the snow
