= Snowflake, West Virginia =

- Unincorporated community
- Location within West Virginia Location within the United States
- Coordinates: 37°44′48″N 80°33′16″W
- Country: United States
- State: West Virginia
- County: Greenbrier
- Elevation: 1,673 ft (510 m)
- Time zone: UTC-5 (Eastern (EST))
  - Summer (DST): UTC-4 (EDT)
- Area codes: 304 & 681
- GNIS feature ID: 1555657

Snowflake is an unincorporated community in Greenbrier County, West Virginia, United States. Snowflake is located near the south bank of the Greenbrier River, 5 miles (8.0 km) west of Ronceverte.
