= Kevin Blizzard =

Australian rules footballer

Personal information
- Full name: Kevin Blizzard
- Born: 13 October 1928
- Died: 9 August 2004 (aged 75)
- Original team: Coburg Reserves
- Height: 191 cm (6 ft 3 in)
- Weight: 85 kg (187 lb)

Playing career^{1}
| Years | Club | Games (Goals) |
| 1952 | Fitzroy | 1 (0) |
- ^{1} Playing statistics correct to the end of 1952.

Kevin Blizzard (13 October 1928 – 9 August 2004) was an Australian rules footballer who played with Fitzroy in the Victorian Football League (VFL).
