= Snow rural council =

Snow rural council Сноўскі сельсавет (Belarusian) Сновский сельсовет (Russian)
- Rural council
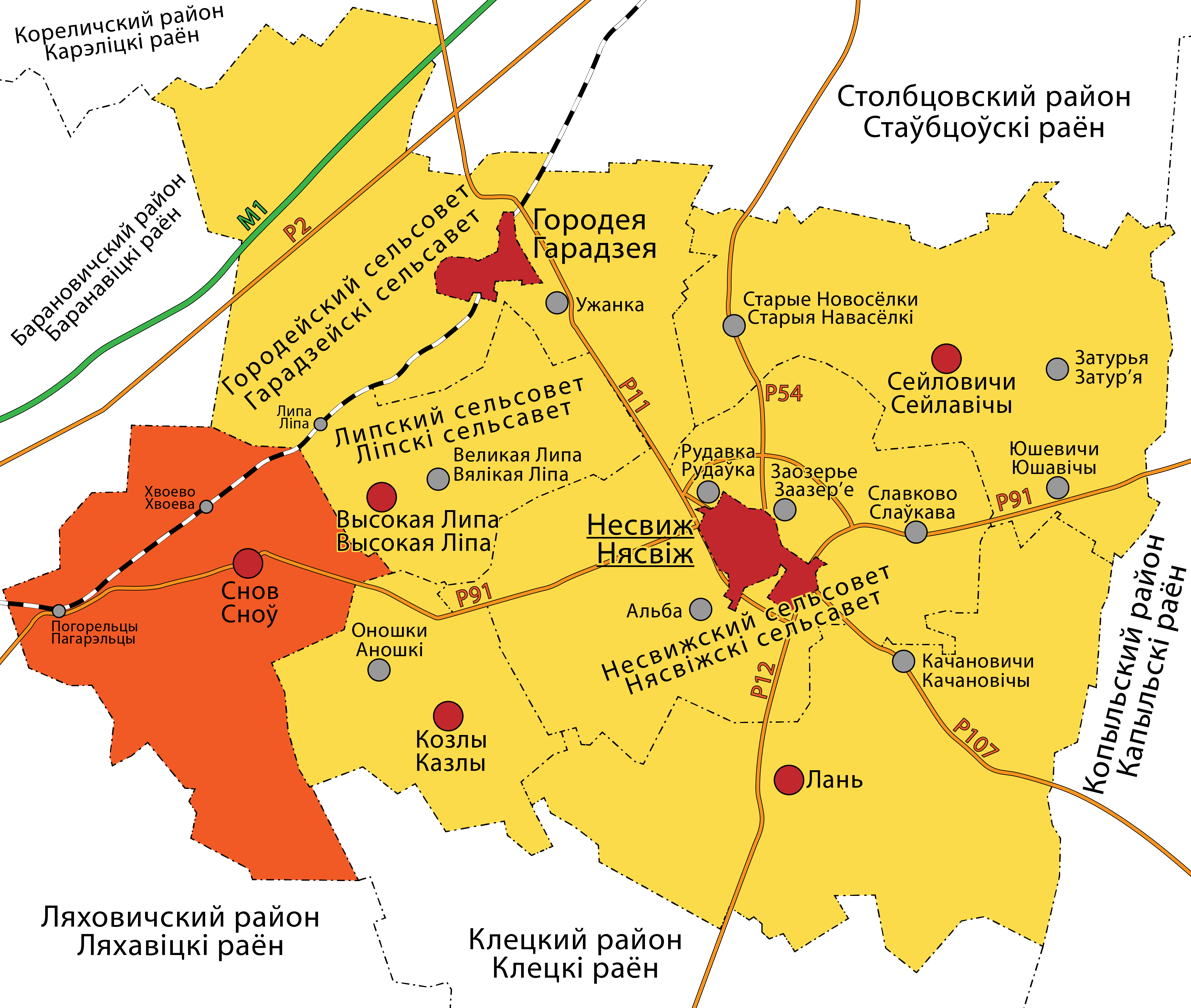
- Snow rural council
- Interactive map of Snow rural council
- Coordinates: 53.2188°N 26.40727°E
- Region: Minsk
- District: Nyasvizh
- Rural council: Snow

Population (2019)
  - Total: 5,089
- Time zone: UTC+3 (MSK)

Snow rural council is a lower-level subdivision (selsoviet) of Nyasvizh district, Minsk region, Belarus. Its center is the agrotown of Snow

It has two more agrotowns: Hrytskyevichy and Drutskawshchyna.
