= Blowing snow advisory =

Weather advisory in the United States

A blowing snow advisory was issued by the National Weather Service of the United States when wind driven snow reduces surface visibility and possibly hampers traveling. Blowing snow may be falling snow, or snow that has already accumulated but is picked up and blown by strong winds. This advisory was discontinued beginning with the 2008–09 winter storm season, replaced by the winter weather advisory for snow and blowing snow. However, if the storm is judged to be dangerous by local forecasters, a winter storm warning for heavy snow and blowing snow may be issued.

A similar bulletin is issued by Environment Canada's Meteorological Service of Canada but as a warning.

== Example of a snow and blowing snow advisory ==
URGENT - WINTER WEATHER MESSAGE
NATIONAL WEATHER SERVICE DODGE CITY KS
659 AM CST MON JAN 2 2009

...NEAR ZERO VISIBILITY BEING REPORTED ACROSS PARTS OF WESTERN KANSAS
EARLY THIS MORNING...

.AN INTENSE WINTER STORM WAS MOVING ACROSS WESTERN KANSAS EARLY THIS
MORNING BRINGING SNOW AND BLOWING SNOW ON STRONG NORTH WINDS. A
BAND OF SNOW AND BLOWING SNOW WAS REDUCING VISIBILITY DOWN TO ZERO
IN MANY LOCATIONS ALONG AND WEST OF U.S. HIGHWAY 281. THIS BAND OF 
SNOW WILL MOVE EAST THROUGH AREAS OF WEST KANSAS THROUGH MID DAY...
AND SHOULD BE TAPERING OFF FROM WEST TO EAST THROUGH THE LATE 
MORNING HOURS WITH VISIBILITIES IMPROVING.

KSZ030-031-043>046-061>066-074>081-084>090-271030-
/O.CON.KDDC.SB.Y.0002.000000T0000Z-091238T0659Z/
TREGO-ELLIS-SCOTT-LANE-NESS-RUSH-HAMILTON-KEARNY-FINNEY-HODGEMAN-
PAWNEE-STAFFORD-STANTON-GRANT-HASKELL-GRAY-FORD-EDWARDS-KIOWA-
PRATT-MORTON-STEVENS-SEWARD-MEADE-CLARK-COMANCHE-BARBER
INCLUDING THE CITIES OF...WAKEENEY...HAYS...SCOTT CITY...
DIGHTON...NESS CITY...LA CROSSE...SYRACUSE...LAKIN...GARDEN
CITY...JETMORE...LARNED...ST JOHN...JOHNSON CITY...
ULYSSES...SUBLETTE...CIMARRON...DODGE CITY...KINSLEY...
GREENSBURG...PRATT...ELKHART...HUGOTON...LIBERAL...MEADE...
ASHLAND...COLDWATER...MEDICINE LODGE
659 AM CST MON JAN 2 2009

...SNOW AND BLOWING SNOW ADVISORY REMAINS IN EFFECT UNTIL NOON
CST TODAY...

A SNOW AND BLOWING SNOW ADVISORY REMAINS IN EFFECT UNTIL NOON CST
TODAY.

WIDESPREAD 1 TO 3 INCHES OF SNOW IS EXPECTED TO ACCUMULATE ON 25
TO 35 MPH NORTH WINDS THROUGH THE NIGHT AND EARLY MORNING HOURS
SATURDAY. WIND GUSTS WILL EXCEED 40 MPH AT TIMES. THE SNOW AND
BLOWING SNOW WILL CAUSE VISIBILITY TO BE REDUCED TO A QUARTER MILE
OR LESS IN SOME LOCATIONS. CONDITIONS SHOULD BE IMPROVING LATER THIS
MORNING AND AFTERNOON AS THE STORM SYSTEM MOVES EAST OF THE
REGION. TRAVEL SHOULD BE POSTPONED UNTIL CONDITIONS IMPROVE BY
MIDDAY.

A SNOW AND BLOWING SNOW ADVISORY MEANS THAT VISIBILITIES WILL BE
LIMITED DUE TO A COMBINATION OF FALLING AND BLOWING SNOW. USE
CAUTION WHEN TRAVELING...ESPECIALLY IN OPEN AREAS.

$$

GERARD
 

== Example of a blowing snow advisory ==
URGENT - WINTER WEATHER MESSAGE
NATIONAL WEATHER SERVICE SALT LAKE CITY UT
339 PM MST THU FEB 14 2008

UTZ002>005-150300-
/O.EXT.KSLC.BS.Y.0001.000000T0000Z-080215T0300Z/
NORTHERN WASATCH FRONT-SALT LAKE AND TOOELE VALLEYS-
SOUTHERN WASATCH FRONT-GREAT SALT LAKE DESERT AND MOUNTAINS-
339 PM MST THU FEB 14 2008

...BLOWING SNOW ADVISORY NOW IN EFFECT UNTIL 8 PM MST THIS
EVENING...

THE BLOWING SNOW ADVISORY IS NOW IN EFFECT UNTIL 8 PM MST THIS
EVENING FOR THE SALT LAKE AND TOOELE VALLEYS...SOUTHERN WASATCH
FRONT AND THE GREAT SALT LAKE DESERT.

NORTHERLY WINDS OF 20 TO 30 MPH WILL CONTINUE INTO THIS EVENING
OVER THE WESTERN PORTIONS OF THE SALT LAKE VALLEY...TOOELE VALLEY...RUSH
VALLEY AND THE GREAT SALT LAKE DESERT WITH CONSIDERABLE BLOWING
AND DRIFTING. ALSO...STRONG WINDS WILL OCCUR IN AND NEAR THE
CANYON MOUTHS OF THE WASATCH MOUNTAINS FROM PROVO TO BRIGHAM CITY.

A BLOWING SNOW ADVISORY MEANS THAT VISIBILITIES WILL BE LIMITED
DUE TO STRONG WINDS BLOWING SNOW AROUND. USE CAUTION WHEN
TRAVELING...ESPECIALLY IN OPEN AREAS ALONG I-80 AND I-15.

$$

FOR MORE INFORMATION FROM NOAA/S NATIONAL WEATHER SERVICE VISIT...
HTTP://WEATHER.GOV/SALTLAKECITY (ALL LOWER CASE)

== See also ==
- Severe weather terminology (United States)
