= Ice Mountain (disambiguation) =

Ice Mountain is a mountain ridge in Hampshire County, West Virginia, US.

Ice Mountain may also refer to:

- Ice Mountain (Colorado), US, a mountain
- Ice Mountain (brand), a brand of bottled water
- Mount Edziza, a volcano in British Columbia, Canada

== See also ==
- Iceberg
- Icepeak (disambiguation)
