= Icecap (disambiguation) =

An ice cap or icecap is a geographical feature.

Icecap may also refer to

- Icecap Peak, a mountain in British Columbia
- Raleigh IceCaps, a defunct ECHL Hockey Team
- St. John's IceCaps, a team in the American Hockey League
- IceCap Zone, a level from the 1994 video game Sonic the Hedgehog 3
- Hypothermia cap, medical device to cool the human scalp

== See also ==
- "Ice Capp", Tim Horton's "iced cappuccino", see Cappuccino#Iced cappuccino
- Polar ice cap
- Ice cap climate
- Ice field
- Ice sheet
- Glacier
- Snow cap (disambiguation)
