= Big Snow =

Big Snow may refer to:

== Places ==
- Big Snow Mountain (British Columbia), a summit in the Coast Mountains, Canada
- Big Snow Mountain, King County, State of Washington, USA; a mountain in the Cascades Range
- Dasyueshan (Chinese: 大雪山, "Big Snow Mountain"), Taiwan; a mountain in the Xueshan Range
- Hatun Rit'i (Quechua; "Big Snow"), Peru; a mountain in the Andes
- Gogebic Range (Big Snow Country) in Iron County and Gogebic County, Michigan, USA, a region heavily afflicted with lake-effect snowfalls.
- Big Snow Creek (Mississippi), a U.S. creek in Snow Lake Shores, Mississippi
- Big Snow Lake (Mississippi), a U.S. lake in Snow Lake Shores, Mississippi
- Big Snow Lake (Washington), a U.S. lake on Big Snow Mountain; see List of lakes in the Alpine Lakes Wilderness

=== Facilities and structures ===
- Big Snow Resort, Bessemer, Michigan, USA; a ski resort, see Comparison of North American ski resorts
- Big Snow American Dream, ('Big Snow' at American Dream Meadowlands), "Big Snow", an indoor ski on snow resort at the "American Dream" shopping mall in East Rutherford, New Jersey, USA.

== Climate and weather ==
- Blizzard, a large, snowy winter storm
  - Thundersnow
  - Noreaster
    - March 1960 nor'easter (a.k.a. The Big Snow), a blizzard that stuck New England, USA
  - 1967 Chicago blizzard (a.k.a. The Big Snow of 1967), a blizzard that struck Illinois and Indiana, USA
- A winter with heavy snowfall
  - The winter of 1716–1717 in Sutton, Massachusetts, USA; when it was founded; see Benjamin Marsh
  - The winters of 1880, 1881, 1893, 1916, in the U.S. state of Washington; see Washington (state)#Climate
  - 1981–82 United Kingdom cold wave (a.k.a. The Big Snow of 1982), a harsh winter in the United Kingdom during December and January.

== Literature ==
- The Big Snow (1949 book) an award-winning illustrated children's story book
- The Big Snow (1962 novel), a western genre fiction novel by Brian Garfield
- Big Snow (2014 book), an award recognized illustrated book under the Charlotte Zolotow Award

== Other uses ==
- The Big Snow (festival), a music festival in the United Kingdom; see Eddy Temple-Morris
- Big Snow (festival), an annual March music festival in Serbia, at the Kopaonik ski resort

== See also ==
- Winter storm
- Northeast Snowfall Impact Scale
  - List of Northeast Snowfall Impact Scale winter storms
- Snowstorm (disambiguation)
- Winter storm (disambiguation)
