= Frost line (disambiguation) =

In geology, the frost line is the level down to which the soil will normally freeze each winter. By an analogy, the term is introduced in other areas.

- Frost line (astrophysics), a particular distance in the solar nebula from the central protosun where it is cool enough for hydrogen compounds such as water, ammonia, and methane to condense into solid ice grains.
- Frost line (polymers) in polymer film manufacturing, a notion related to physical changes from melt into solid film during extrusion.

== See also ==
- Snow line
- Frost (disambiguation)
- Line (disambiguation)
