= Snowflake (heraldry) =

Heraldic figure

The snowflake or snow crystal, is a charge in heraldry.

The display in coats of arms is following a strictly stylized form of the natural six pointed crystal form of a snowflake. In older heraldic literature, this charge is not to be seen. In modern heraldry, the snowflake is most used in northern Europe, in arms in Sweden, Norway and Finland, where it alludes to the meteorological features of the lands. Otherwise, it also is a symbol for winter, and together with the sun the changing seasons (e.g. In the arms of Bad Kleinkirchheim, Austria,), or locally important winter sport (e.g. Saalbach-Hinterglemm, Austria, together with a pair of skis).

The tincture is often argent (silver).

Bad Kleinkirchheim

Kylmäkoski

Lumijoki

Mullsjö

Böxlund

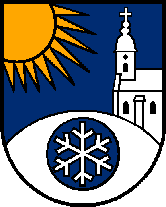
Kirchschlag bei Linz

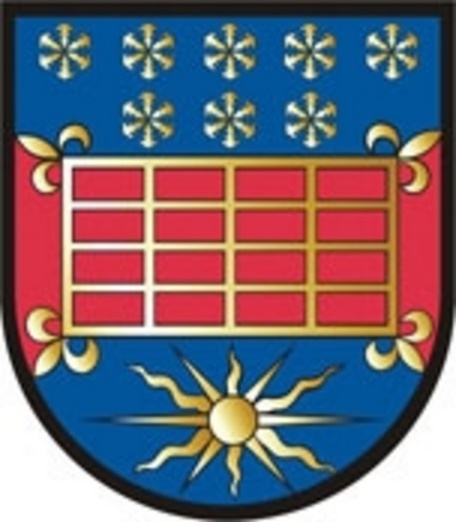
Sankt Lorenzen am Wechsel

Saalbach-Hinterglemm

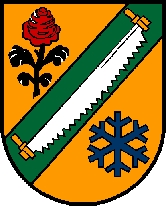
Sandl

== Literature ==
- Walter Leonhard: Das große Buch der Wappenkunst. Entwicklung, Elemente, Bildmotive, Gestaltung. Lizenzausgabe. Bechtermünz, Augsburg 2001, ISBN 3-8289-0768-7, S. 261.
