= Snow (agrotown) =

Agrotown in Minsk region, Belarus

Coordinates: 53.2188°N 26.40727°E

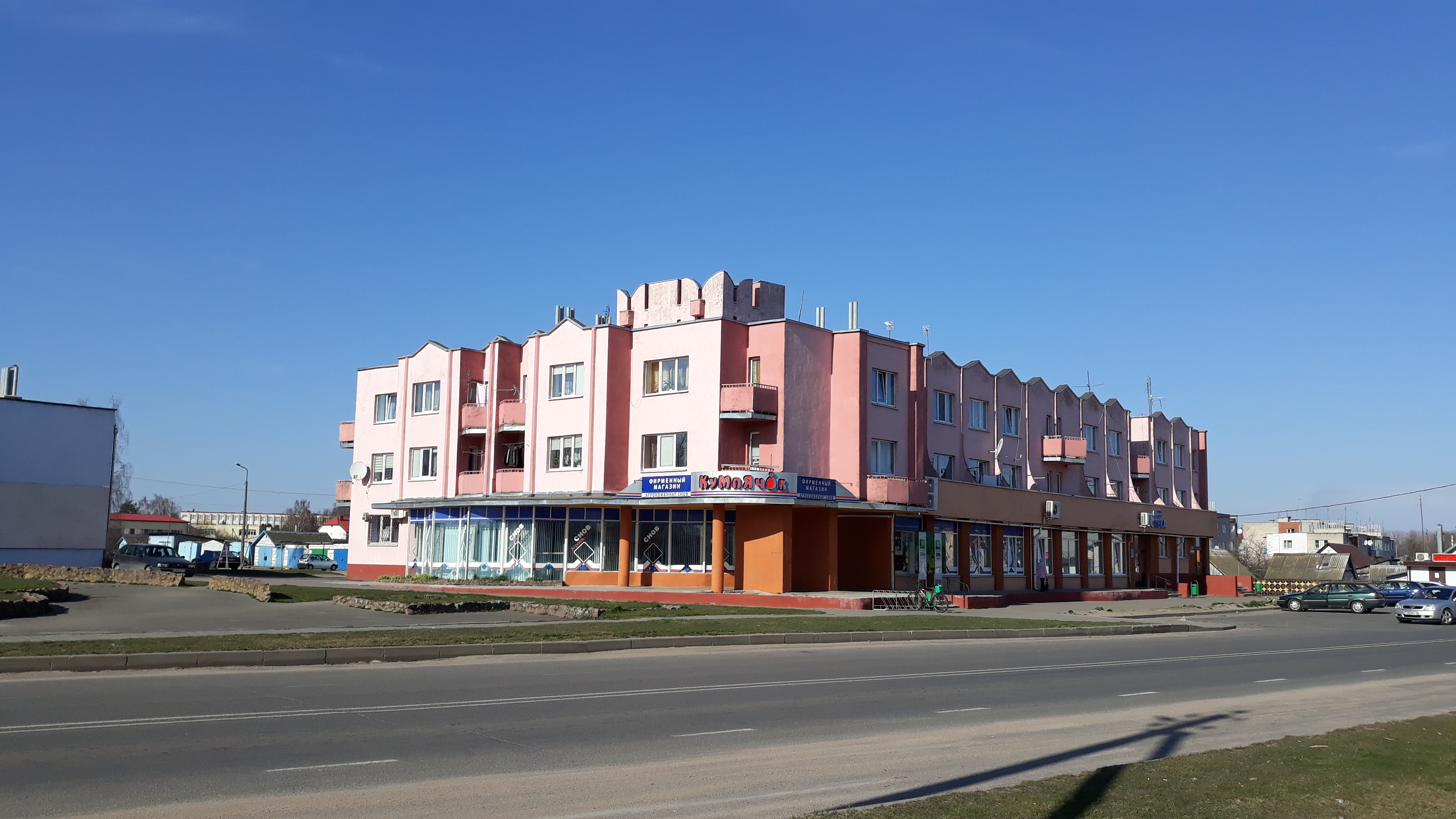
Streets of Snow

Snow or Snov (Belarusian: Сноў, romanized: Snoŭ; Russian: Снов) is an agrotown in Nyasvizh district, Minsk region, Belarus. It is the center of the Snow rural council.

== History ==
Originally the miasteczko of Snów and the surrounding villages belonged to the Radziwiłł family. Over time it changed the ownership several times.

== Enterprizes ==
- Snov starch plant
- Agrocombine "Snov"; dairy, eggs, meat, and poultry production
