= Severe weather terminology (Canada) =

Severe weather-related terminology used by the Meteorological Service of Canada

This article describes severe weather terminology used by the Meteorological Service of Canada, a branch within Environment and Climate Change Canada. The article primarily describes various weather warnings, and their criteria. Related weather scales and general weather terms are also addressed in this article. Some terms are specific to certain regions.

== Warning categories ==
Severe weather bulletins are issued as a watch or a warning, depending on the risk or severity of the event.

- Watches are issued when conditions are favourable for the development of severe weather, but the occurrence, location, and/or timing is still too uncertain to issue a warning. The target lead time for severe thunderstorm watches is typically six hours before the event, whereas watches for winter events have a target lead time of 12 to 24 hours in advance. Watches are intended to raise awareness of the public to the potential for hazardous weather conditions, and typically serve as a lead-up to a warning.
- Warnings are issued when severe weather is either imminent or occurring. Warnings for synoptic scale events such as snowstorms are issued with an ideal lead time of at least six, and up to 24 hours. Severe thunderstorm warnings and tornado warnings, by their nature, will typically be issued with very little lead time. Weather warnings are usually issued for regular forecast regions affected. Severe thunderstorm and tornado warnings, however, might be issued specifically for smaller warning or "sub-regions" within the regular forecast area where available.
- Advisories are issued in a similar format to that of an official warning. Unlike warnings, however, these types of bulletins describe exceptional weather events that are generally not considered hazardous, such as frost.
- Special Weather Statements are free form statements that are typically used to describe weather hazards that cannot be described by another watch, warning, or advisory; is not hazardous enough to warrant issuing a watch or warning; or to warn the public of a potentially hazardous weather event in the long term forecast.

Alerts are typically updated every six hours, except for mesoscale/summer severe weather alerts which are updated when necessary.

Weather alerts (watches or warnings) are also accompanied by a colour, which is determined by the potential impacts of the event and its confidence, ranging from moderate to very high. Special weather statements are not accompanied by a colour.

- Yellow alert: This is the most common type of warning issued. Hazardous weather may cause damage, disruption, or health impacts, but impacts will be moderate, localized and/or short-term. Yellow alerts are also issued when there is the possibility of high or very high impacts, but forecast confidence is low to moderate.
- Orange alert: These are uncommon and indicate that severe weather is likely to cause significant damage, disruption, or health impacts. Impacts are major, widespread and/or may last a few days. Orange alerts are only issued when forecast confidence is high and there are likely to be high impacts.
- Red alert: Red alerts are the rarest, and indicate very dangerous and possibly life-threatening weather will cause extreme damage and disruption. Impacts are extensive, widespread, and prolonged. These are only issued for very high impact events with very high forecast confidence.

Low impact events are not given a colour, but they may result in the issuing of a Special Weather Statement if appropriate.

=== Warnings colour table ===
Alert colours
| Confidence | Impacts | | | |
| Confidence | Low | Moderate | High | Extreme |
|---|---|---|---|---|
| Low | None | None | Yellow | Yellow |
| Moderate | None | None | Yellow | Orange |
| High | None | Yellow | Orange | Orange |
| Very High | None | Yellow | Orange | Red |

== Weather warnings ==
Weather watches and warnings are issued when potentially hazardous weather is occurring or is forecast for the short term period.

Note: Nunavik, Quebec only participates in two types of weather warnings: Extreme Cold Warnings and Wind Warnings. No other types of watches or warnings are issued in this region of the country.

=== Mesoscale/Summer severe weather ===
- Severe Thunderstorm Watch (SAME event code: SVA) – Issued when the potential exists for the development of severe thunderstorms, which are capable of producing one or more of the following:
  - Large hail (2.5 cm or more in diameter)
  - Damaging winds (Gusts 90 km/h (56 mph) or greater)
  - Heavy rain (Alberta, Saskatchewan, Manitoba, Ontario, and Quebec: 50 mm (2.0 in) or more per hour. Interior dry sections of British Columbia: 15mm or more rain in one hour. Remaining sections of British Columbia, Yukon, Northwest Territories, Nunavut, New Brunswick, Prince Edward Island, Nova Scotia, Newfoundland and Labrador: 25 mm (0.98 in) per hour. Nunavik: 50 mm or more of rain in one hour)
- Severe Thunderstorm Warning (SVR) – Issued when a severe thunderstorm is detected on radar or are observed by those in the immediate area. A warning is issued when one or more of the following has been detected or highly possible:
  - Large hail (2.5 cm or more in diameter)
  - Damaging winds (Gusts 90 km/h (56 mph) or greater)
  - Heavy rain (Alberta, Saskatchewan, Manitoba, Ontario, and Quebec: 50 mm (2.0 in) or more per hour. Interior dry sections of British Columbia: 15mm or more rain in one hour. Remaining sections of British Columbia, Yukon, Northwest Territories, Nunavut, New Brunswick, Prince Edward Island, Nova Scotia, Newfoundland and Labrador: 25 mm (0.98 in) per hour. Nunavik: 50 mm or more of rain in one hour)

Public bulletins will often mention the possibility of tornadoes; if a tornado is spotted or conditions are favourable enough for tornado development, the warning will be upgraded accordingly.

- Tornado Watch (TOA) – Issued when conditions are favourable for the development of severe thunderstorms with one or more tornadoes. Tornado Watches are also issued when cold core funnel clouds are possible and pose a threat to people on the ground. If cold core funnel clouds are not expected to touch down, a weather advisory will be issued instead. If there is a landspout on the ground, a Tornado Warning will be issued.
- Tornado Warning (TOR) – Issued when one or more tornadoes are occurring in the area specified or rotation is detected on Doppler weather radar, or when someone spots a supercell tornado or a landspout on the ground. The exact location of the tornado or storm will be given in the statement.

=== Hurricanes and other tropical systems ===
- Tropical Storm Watch (TRA) – Issued when a tropical storm or tropical storm conditions pose a threat to coastal areas generally within 36 hours. A watch will generally cover a larger threat area than a warning, as the uncertainty on the track of the storm is greater.
- Tropical Storm Warning (TRW) – Issued when winds of 63 to 117 km/h (39 to 73 mph; 34 to 63 kn) are expected. Warnings are not issued more than 24 hours in advance.
- Hurricane Watch (HUA) – Issued when a hurricane approaches the mainland and is considered a threat to coastal and inland regions.
- Hurricane Warning (HUW) – Issued when winds greater than 117 km/h (73 mph; 63 kn) are expected to occur for coastal or inland regions. It may also include areas where storm surge or exceptionally high waves are predicted, even though winds may be less than hurricane force. Warnings are not issued more than 24 hours in advance. If the path is erratic or if the hurricane undergoes a transition into a post-tropical system, the warning may only be issued a few hours in advance. Almost always accompanied by a Wind Warning.
- Storm Surge Warning – Issued when a storm surge and/or high waves may result in significant flooding in coastal areas. Sometimes issued during strong Nor'easters or other non-tropical storms.

=== Winter weather ===
- Winter Storm Watch (WSA) – Issued when conditions are favourable for the development of hazardous winter conditions, including:
  - a blizzard.
  - a major snowfall of 25 cm (9.8 in) or more in a 24-hour period.
  - a significant snowfall (snowfall warning criteria) combined with another winter hazard such as freezing rain, strong winds, blowing snow and/or extreme cold.
- Winter Storm Warning (WSW) – Issued when hazardous winter conditions are expected or occurring, including:
  - a major snowfall of 25 cm (9.8 in) or more in a 24-hour period.
  - a significant snowfall (snowfall warning criteria) combined with another winter hazard such as freezing rain, strong winds, blowing snow and/or extreme cold.
- Blizzard Warning (BZW) – Issued when winds of 40 km/h (25 mph) or more, are expected to cause widespread reductions in visibilities to less than 400 m (0.25 mi), due to blowing snow, for at least four hours (except six hours north of the tree line).
- Snowfall Warning (WSW) – Issued when significant amounts of snow are expected to fall over a 12-hour period. These amounts vary across the country due to topographical and climatic considerations. Criteria ranges from 10 to 15 cm (3.9 to 5.9 in) in a 12-hour period, with local exceptions for southwestern British Columbia (5 cm (2.0 in) in a 6-hour period) and Haines Skagway roads in British Columbia/Yukon (20 cm (7.9 in) in a 24-hour period).
- Snow Squall Watch – There are two types of snow squalls of which alerts are issued for:
  - Open-Water – Issued when, down wind of a large body of water, conditions are favourable for the development of snow squalls with one or more of the following conditions:
    - Local, intense snowfall resulting in accumulations of 15 cm (5.9 in) or more in 12 hours or less.
    - Reduced visibility less than 400 m (0.25 mi), caused by snowfall, with or without blowing snow, for 3 hours or more.
  - Frontal – Issued when conditions are favourable for the development of snow squalls that produce brief periods of very poor visibilities caused by heavy snow and blowing snow caused by the passage of a cold front.
- Snow Squall Warning (WSW) – There are two types of snow squalls of which alerts are issued for:
  - Open-Water – Issued when, down wind of a large body of water, snow squalls are imminent or occurring with one or more of the following conditions:
    - Local, intense snowfall resulting in accumulations of 15 cm (5.9 in) or more in 12 hours or less.
    - Reduced visibility less than 400 m (0.25 mi), caused by snowfall, with or without blowing snow, for 3 hours or more.
  - Frontal – Issued when a brief period (less than one hour) of poor visibility of 400 m (0.25 mi) or less caused by heavy snow and blowing snow, accompanied by strong, gusty winds of 45 km/h (28 mph) or more, is expected or occurring with the passage of a cold front.
- Freezing Rain Warning (WSW) – Issued when freezing rain is expected to create a hazard to transportation and property, or when freezing rain is expected to persist for at least 2 hours (criteria is 4 hours in Atlantic Canada and Magdalen Islands).
- Flash Freeze Warning (FSW) – Issued when significant ice is expected to form due to a rapid drop in temperatures, causing freezing of residual water on roads, and sidewalks to quickly build up.

=== General warnings ===
- Wind Warning (HWW) – Varies based on climatology across the country.
  - The national criteria, before exceptions, is when sustained winds of 70 km/h (43 mph) or greater, or wind gusts of 90 km/h (56 mph) or greater, are expected or occurring. Les Suêtes (Cape Breton) or Wreckhouse (Southwest Newfoundland) wind warnings are issued for local wind effects using the national criteria.
  - Wind warning criteria for Southwestern Alberta, Dempster Highway (Yukon), Western Vancouver Island, and Newfoundland and Labrador is when sustained winds of 80 km/h (50 mph) or greater, or wind gusts of 100 km/h (62 mph) or greater, are expected or occurring.
  - Wind warning criteria for North Vancouver Island, North Coast (British Columbia), Central Coast (British Columbia), and Haida Gwaii, is when sustained winds of 90 km/h (56 mph) or greater, or wind gusts of 110 km/h (68 mph) or greater, is expected or occurring.
- Rainfall Warning – Local rainfall thresholds vary considerably across Canada and reflect a potential for regional flooding. Seasonal variations of the warning exist to accommodate flooding potential due to the frozen ground’s reduced ability to absorb rainfall and snow melt. The national criteria during the winter is 25 mm (0.98 in) or more in 24 hours. The national criteria in the summer is 50 mm (2.0 in) or more in 24 hours or 75 mm (3.0 in) or more in 48 hours. Regional exceptions apply to different parts of British Columbia, with higher criteria for coastal areas and lower criteria for interior dry regions.
- Heat Warning – Criteria varies considerably across the country and considers combinations of expected maximum temperatures, minimum temperatures, and humidex values. Warnings will be issued when criteria is expected to be met for at least two consecutive days (except Quebec, where criteria only needs to be met for at least one hour).
- Extreme Cold Warning – Criteria varies across the country, ranging from −55 °C (−67 °F) in some Arctic regions to −30 °C (−22 °F) in southwestern Ontario. Warnings will be issued when the air temperature or wind chill is expected to meet the regional criteria for at least two hours.
- Arctic Outflow Warning – An Arctic Outflow Warning is based on a combination of wind speed and temperatures which produce wind chills of at least −20 °C (−4 °F) for at least six hours during the winter when very cold Arctic air breaks from the interior mainland of British Columbia and spills out through mountain gaps and fjords.
- Dust Storm Warning (DSW) – Issued only in the Prairie Provinces when blowing dust caused by high winds is expected to reduce visibility to 800 m (0.50 mi) or less for one hour or more.
- Storm Surge Warning – Issued for abnormally high water levels and high waves caused by storms, which have the potential to cause coastal flooding. This usually occurs when astronomical tides are at their maximum.
- Weather Warning – A generic weather warning may be issued for extreme weather events for which there is no suitable warning type, because they rarely occur. For example, for 50 km/h winds following an ice storm which could cause structural wind damage, even if the wind warning criteria of 90 km/h (56 mph) is not expected to be reached.

=== Marine warnings ===
- Strong Wind (Small Craft) Warning – Issued if winds of 20 to 33 kn (37 to 61 km/h) are forecast.
- Gale Warning – Issued if winds of 34 to 47 kn (63 to 87 km/h) are forecast.
- Storm Warning – Issued if winds of 48 to 63 kn (89 to 117 km/h) are forecast.
- Hurricane Force Wind Warning – Issued for winds of 64 kn (119 km/h) or greater.
- Squall Warning – Issued for forecast or observed wind gusts of 34 kn (63 km/h) or greater that are associated with a line, or an organized area, of thunderstorms.
- Freezing Spray Warning – Freezing spray occurs when a combination of low temperatures and strong winds cause sea spray to freeze on a ship's superstructure or on other structures either in the sea or near the water's edge. A weather warning is issued whenever moderate or heavy ship icing is expected.
- Waterspout Warning/Alert – Issued commonly for Atlantic provinces (usually M-IS). Issued when a waterspout is detected on radar or is observed by trained spotters. The warning is commonly issued to warn persons on water. A waterspout warning can be sometimes issued for an area on land, if it is anticipated that the waterspout or funnel cloud will travel inland.

=== Tsunami ===
- Tsunami Advisory – This advisory indicates a tsunami could produce strong currents and waves are imminent, expected, or occurring. Mainly dangerous to those close to water. Uses messages/alerts from the National Tsunami Warning Center.
- Tsunami Warning – This warning indicates a tsunami is imminent, expected, or occurring. Coastal regions should expect flooding. Uses messages/alerts from the National Tsunami Warning Center.
- Tsunami Watch – Issued for areas which may be affected by an incoming tsunami. Uses messages/alerts from the National Tsunami Warning Center.

==== Areas covered by the Tsunami Alerts ====
- East Coast – Nova Scotia, New Brunswick, Prince Edward Island, Newfoundland and Labrador, areas of Quebec next to the Saint Lawrence River estuary, and Gulf of St. Lawrence.
- West Coast – British Columbia coast and inlets.

== Advisories and Special Weather Statements ==
=== Advisories ===
Advisories are issued in a similar format to that of an official warning. Unlike warnings, however, these types of bulletins describe exceptional weather events that are generally not considered hazardous, but could be a potential concern to the public (for example, frost that can damage crops during the growing season).

Advisories are not issued in Nunavik, Quebec.

Commonly issued advisories as of March 23, 2022 include:

- Blowing Snow Advisory – Issued when blowing snow caused by winds of at least 30 km/h (19 mph) is expected to reduce visibility to 800 m (0.50 mi) or less for at least 3 hours. This advisory is only issued south of the tree line.
- Fog Advisory – Issued when low visibility caused by fog is expected for at least six hours. Advisory criteria for Newfoundland and Labrador, Nova Scotia, New Brunswick, and Prince Edward Island is low visibility caused by fog that lasts at least eighteen hours.
- Freezing Drizzle Advisory – Issued when freezing drizzle is expected to last for at least eight hours.
- Frost Advisory – Issued during the growing season in southern portions of Canada (except British Columbia) where formation of frost is expected due to surface temperatures falling to near 0 °C (32 °F) in the overnight hours.
- Weather Advisory – A message that can be used for any situation for which there is no other alert that effectively describes the conditions expected. Typically used to alert the public about conditions favourable for cold-core funnel clouds.

=== Special Weather Statements ===
A Special Weather Statement is usually issued in two circumstances:

- A warning or watch is not warranted because the expected conditions are less menacing than those necessary to meet warning criteria.
- A warning or watch is not yet practical to be issued, usually due to a high degree of uncertainty of timing, occurrence and/or location of the hazardous conditions.

Special Weather Statements are typically used to make the public aware of a potentially high impact weather event in the long range and so a watch or warning is not yet necessary.

Unlike watches, warnings, and advisories, Special Weather Statements are more free form and have no formal requirement to be issued, updated, or ended.

=== Tropical Cyclone Information Statements ===
Issued when a tropical cyclone that is producing tropical storm-force winds (63–117km/h; 39–73 mph; 34–63 kn) is expected to enter Canadian coastal waters or land in the next three days. The statements are in plain language and provide non-technical storm-specific information that is meant for the general public and media.

A Tropical Cyclone Information Statement consists of three sections:

- Section 1 – The storm’s current position, strength, motion, and central pressure.
- Section 2 – Reported severe weather threats, expected impacts (rainfall, wind, storm surge), and a summary of land watches and warnings issued by the Canadian Hurricane Centre or regional Storm Prediction Centres.
- Section 3 – Summary of marine warnings issued by regional Storm Prediction Centres, reported severe weather and expected impacts.

=== Thunderstorm Outlooks ===
Thunderstorm Outlooks are issued by each regional Storm Prediction Centre for their respective regions, typically starting in May and ending in September. Thunderstorm Outlooks are issued for every province and territory except Nunavut.

The outlooks detail the risk of thunderstorms, with the risk categories ranging from minor, moderate, high, and extreme. The outlooks forecast the types of severe weather (including tornadoes, funnel clouds, damaging winds, large hail, and heavy rain).

== Related weather scales as defined by Environment Canada ==
=== Enhanced Fujita Scale ===
The Enhanced Fujita Scale (EF) is a scale for rating tornado intensity based on the damage on human-built structures and vegetation. While the United States adopted the Enhanced Fujita Scale in 2007, Environment Canada continued to use the original Fujita Scale to assess tornado intensity until April 18, 2013, when the agency adopted the Enhanced Fujita Scale. Tornadoes exceeding F2/EF2 intensity are rare in Canada, although some tornadoes, such as the Edmonton Tornado in 1987, have been as strong as F4. The only F5/EF5 tornado recorded in Canada to date was the Elie, Manitoba tornado in 2007.

=== Saffir-Simpson Hurricane Scale ===
The Saffir-Simpson Hurricane Scale is used by the Canadian Hurricane Centre for hurricanes affecting the East Coast of Canada. The Scale ranges from Category 1, the weakest, to Category 5, the strongest with sustained winds exceeding 250 km/h (160 mph; 130 kn).

== See also ==
- List of severe weather phenomena
- Environment and Climate Change Canada
- Meteorological Service of Canada
- Severe weather terminology (Japan)
- Severe weather terminology (United States)
