= Snow (Beattie short story) =

1986 neorealist short story by Ann Beattie

"Snow" (1986) is a neorealist short story by Ann Beattie.

The story is told by an unnamed female narrator who recounts the story of the time she spent in the country with her former lover. As though she is speaking directly to her former lover she recalls, in great detail, the landscape of the area and some of the events of the winter they spent together.

== Plot summary ==
The story begins with the narrator describing a cold night where her lover unknowingly brings a chipmunk into the house whilst bringing in fire wood, it rushes towards the front door as though it knew this was its path to escape. The house is said to have a library, fireplace and wallpaper depicting purple grapes. The walls are repainted yellow and the narrator imagines the grapes as alive; growing and bursting through the paint. The day of the "big snow" comes and the narrator is reminded of her lover shoveling the driveway; he wraps a towel around his head "like a crazy king of snow". Those who lived nearby admired the couple, having moved from the city to the country, and they had many visitors. The fireplace is said to "make" the visitors want to tell amazing stories; the narrator speculates that this may have been because they wanted the couple to become an amazing story, but quickly concludes that "they probably guessed it wouldn't work".

The narrator claims her lover imagined the "big snow" differently, and that he believed the chipmunk ran into the dark, not towards the door. Perhaps this difference in perspective reflects the contrasting value of the experience to each of them; to the narrator it is one of her most cherished times, however the lover is not as enthusiastic. The stories of the visitors are described as being the same and the former lover believes "any life will seem dramatic if you omit mention of most of it".

The narrative switches to a description of the narrators journey back to the house after their relationship had ended. Their neighbour there, Allen, had died; Allen was "the good friend in bad times". The narrator sits with Allen's wife in their living room, gazing out onto their pool which had the cover on which was so full of rain water it had overflowed. She likens the blooming crocuses, a white flower, to the snow but concludes that they cannot compare.

The narrative is described as how a story should be told, "somebody grew up, fell in love, and spent a winter with her lover in her country". It is then quickly written off as a brief outline not worthy of discussion because eventually large periods of time are remembered only by short moments. The story ends with the mention of a snowplow that seemed to always be there, scraping snow from the road; "an artery cleared, though neither of us could have said where the heart was".

== Symbolism ==
- Purity and Innocence - these are represented by snow in the story. The time the couple shared at the house is considered pure, innocent and without fault; the emotions of the narrator are encompassed by the snow. This is substantiated by the fact that the narrator's emotions for her former lover, and of the time spent at the house, are not evoked by simply revisiting that place, but by the crocuses slight resemblance of the snow.

== Background ==
Ann Beattie wrote "Snow" whilst teaching a creative writing class in the 1980s. She had asked her students to write a "you" story and decided to also write one herself.

== Literary Devices ==
Simile - "Our first week in the house was spent scraping, finding some of the house's secrets, like wallpaper underneath wallpaper" The discovery of the houses secrets is compared to finding wallpaper under wallpaper.

"The day of the big snow, when you had to shovel the walk and could not find your cap and asked me how to wind a towel so that it would stay on your head, you in the white towel turban like a crazy king of snow." The narrator compares her lover, with a towel wrapped around his head, to a king.
