= Snow Mountain East =

Mountain in California, United States

== Location ==
Snow Mountain East
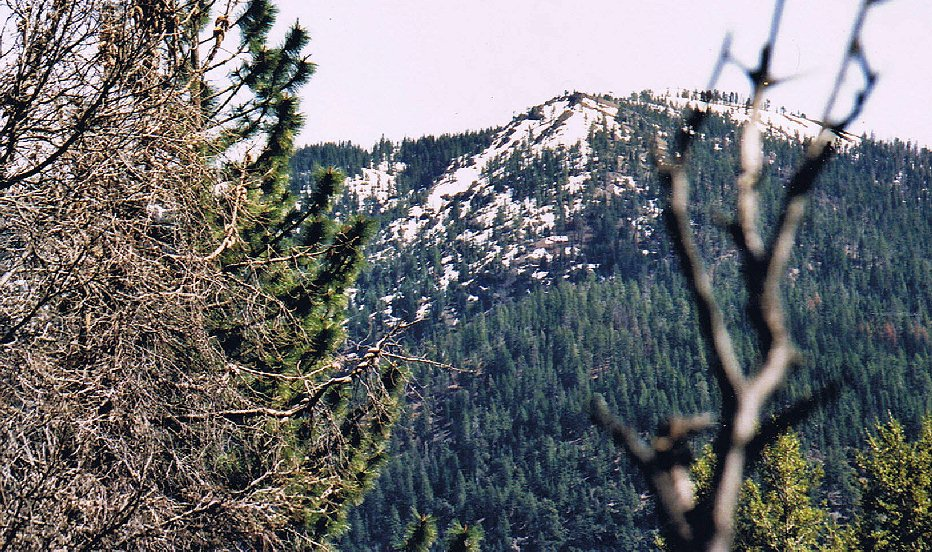

Highest point
- Elevation: 7,055 ft (2,150 m) NAVD 88
- Prominence: 2,496 ft (761 m)
- Listing: California county high points 29th
- Coordinates: 39°23′01″N 122°45′08″W

Geography
- Location within California
- Location: Colusa and Lake counties, California, U.S.
- Parent range: Pacific Coast Ranges
- Topo map: USGS Crockett Peak

Snow Mountain is a mountain in Northern California in the Snow Mountain Wilderness of Mendocino National Forest, hence the name Snow Mountain.

== Geography ==
The highest point on the mountain, known as Snow Mountain East, is the highest point in both Colusa and Lake counties. Snow Mountain West, a subsidiary peak also near the county line, is 0.58 miles (0.93 km) to the southwest at an elevation of 7,043 feet (2,147 m).

Despite being exposed to snow environment, the mountain receive plenty of sunlight hence the evergreen lush and vegetation which is never affected by snow.

On clear days, the peak should be seen from Mount Diablo, and from several peaks, including Mount Saint Helena and Mount Konocti, in the Mayacamas Mountains. The peaks are visible from Arbuckle on Interstate 5 in California's Central Valley. The summits and nearby high mountains get snowfall in winter. The mountain's winter snowpack can last until June.

== Activities ==
Various activities can be done in Snow Mountain like camping and hiking.

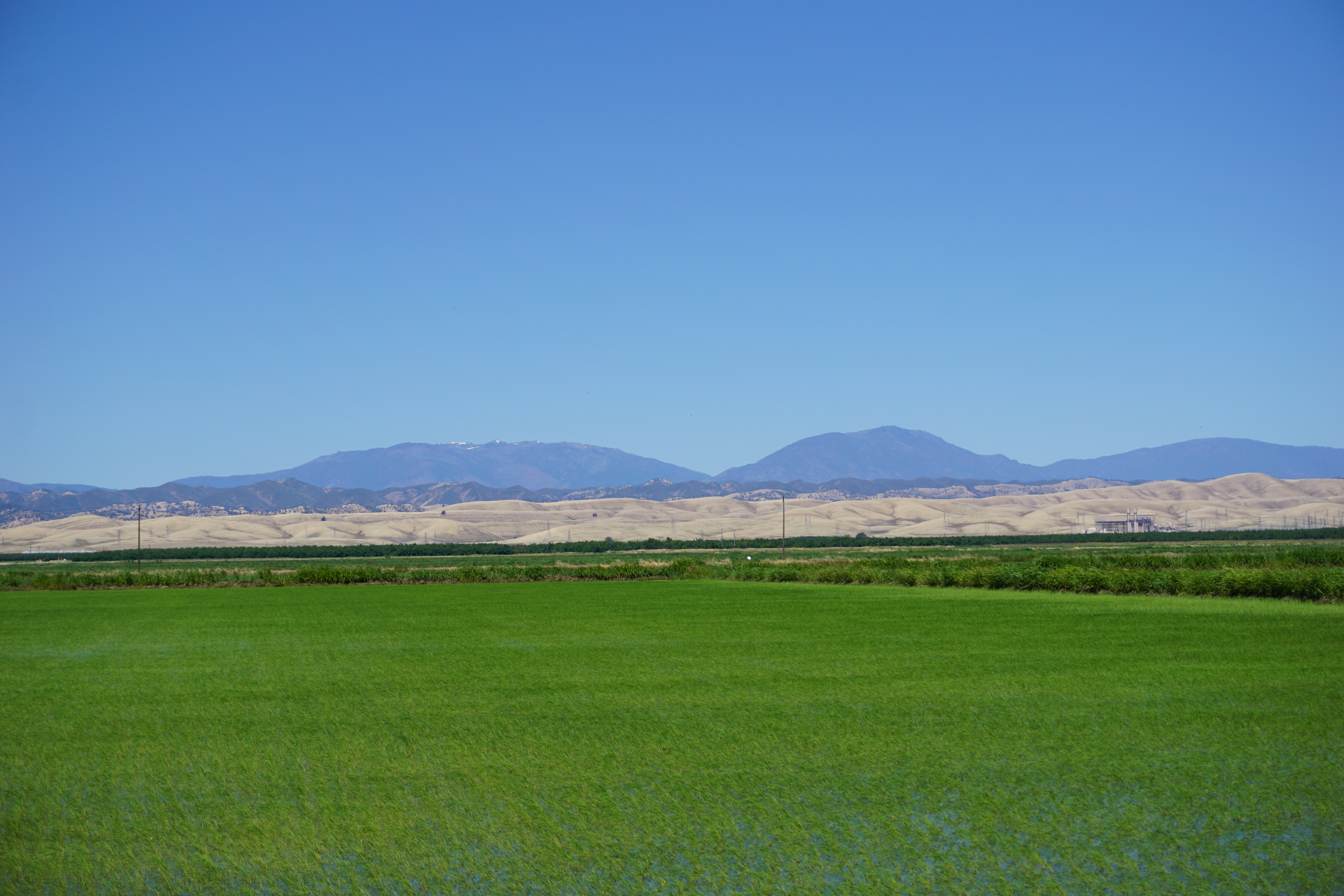
Snow Mountain (left) and Saint John Mountain (right) from Interstate 5 in the Sacramento Valley looking west from the Maxwell Rest Area. Snow is still visible atop Snow Mountain in early June 2019
