= Whiteout (weather) =

Reduced visibility due to snow or sand

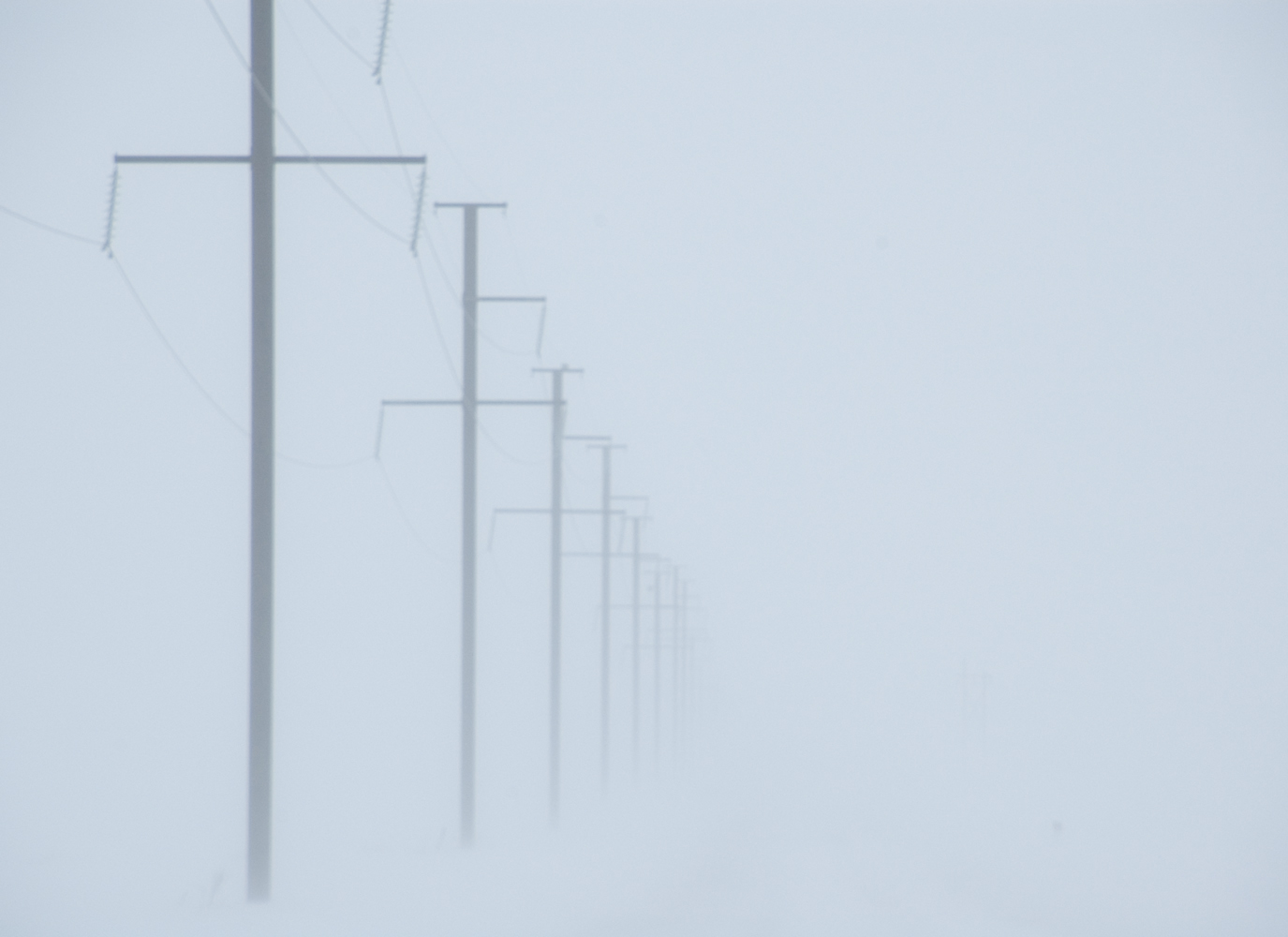
Whiteout in Saskatchewan (March 2007)

Whiteout snow squall northwest of Waterloo, Ontario, Canada (February 27, 2014)

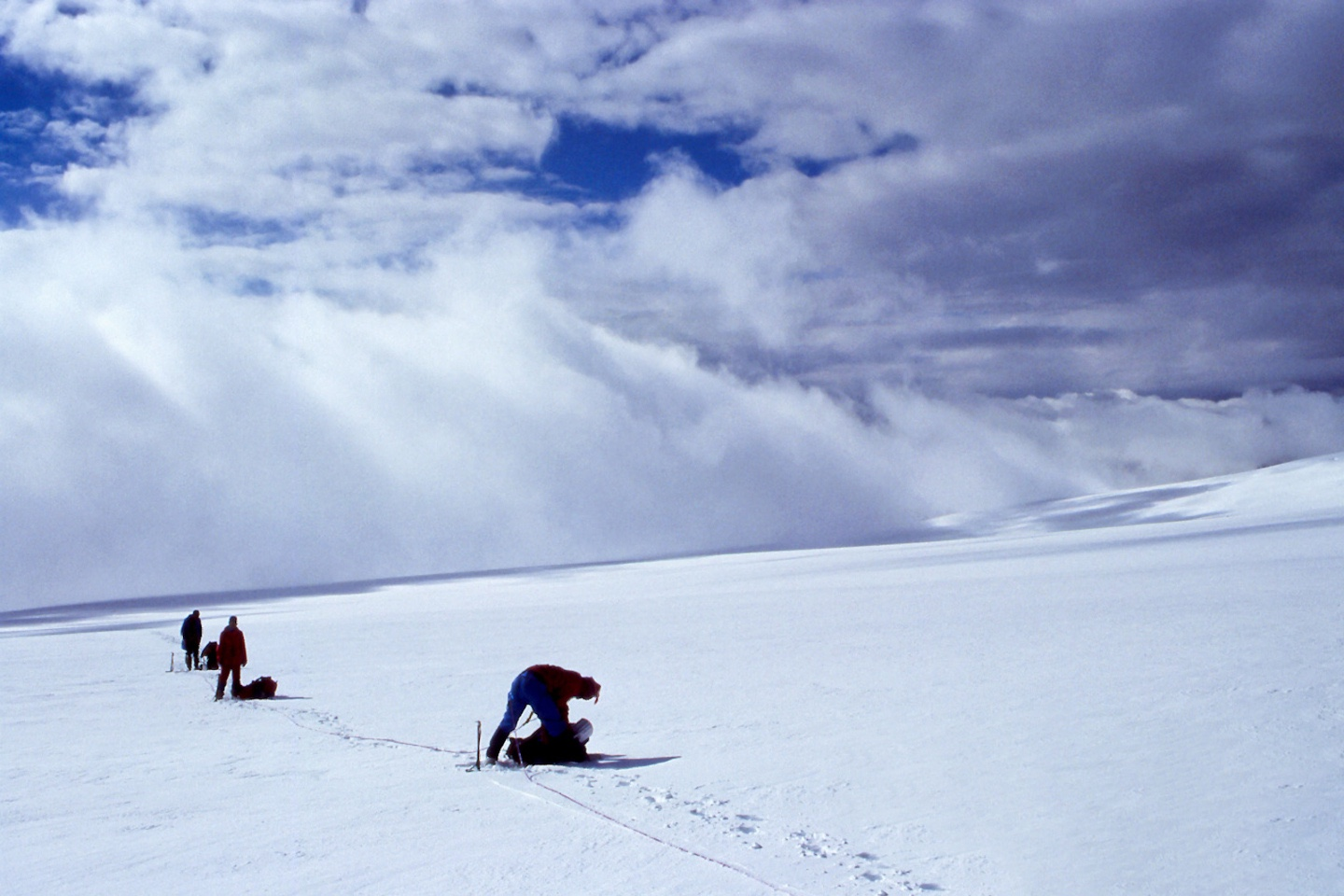
Background shows large, stationary whiteout on Lyell Icefield that lasted 4 hours

Whiteout or white-out is a weather condition in which visibility and contrast are severely reduced by snow, fog, or sand. The horizon disappears from view while the sky and landscape appear featureless, leaving no points of visual reference by which to navigate.

A whiteout may be due simply to extremely heavy snowfall rates as seen in lake effect conditions, or to other factors such as diffuse lighting from overcast clouds, mist or fog, or a background of snow. A person traveling in a true whiteout is at significant risk of becoming completely disoriented and losing their way, even in familiar surroundings. Motorists typically have to stop their cars where they are, as the road is impossible to see. Normal snowfalls and blizzards, where snow is falling at 3 or 5 centimeters per hour (1 or 2 in/h), or where the relief visibility is not clear yet having a clear field of view for over 9 meters (30 ft), are often incorrectly called whiteouts.

== Types ==
There are three different forms of a whiteout:

1. In blizzard conditions, snow already on the ground can become windblown, reducing visibility to near zero.
2. In snowfall conditions, the volume of snow falling may obscure objects reducing visibility to near zero. An example of this is during lake-effect snow or mountain-effect snow, where the volume of snow can be many times greater than normal snows or blizzards.
3. Where ground-level thick fog exists in a snow-covered environment, especially on open areas devoid of features.

== Variations ==
A whiteout should not be confused with flat-light. Whilst there are similarities, both the causes and effects are different.

A whiteout is a reduction and scattering of sunlight.

Cause: Sunlight is blocked, reduced and scattered by ice crystals in falling snow, wind-blown spin-drift, water droplets in low-lying clouds or localised fog, etc. The remaining scattered light is merged and blended.

Result: Due to a reduction in reflected light, visual references e.g. the horizon, terrain features, slope aspect, etc. are significantly reduced or completely blocked. This leads to an inability to position yourself relative to the surroundings. In severe conditions an individual may experience a loss of kinesthesia (ability to discern position and movement), confusion, loss of balance, and an overall reduction in the ability to operate.

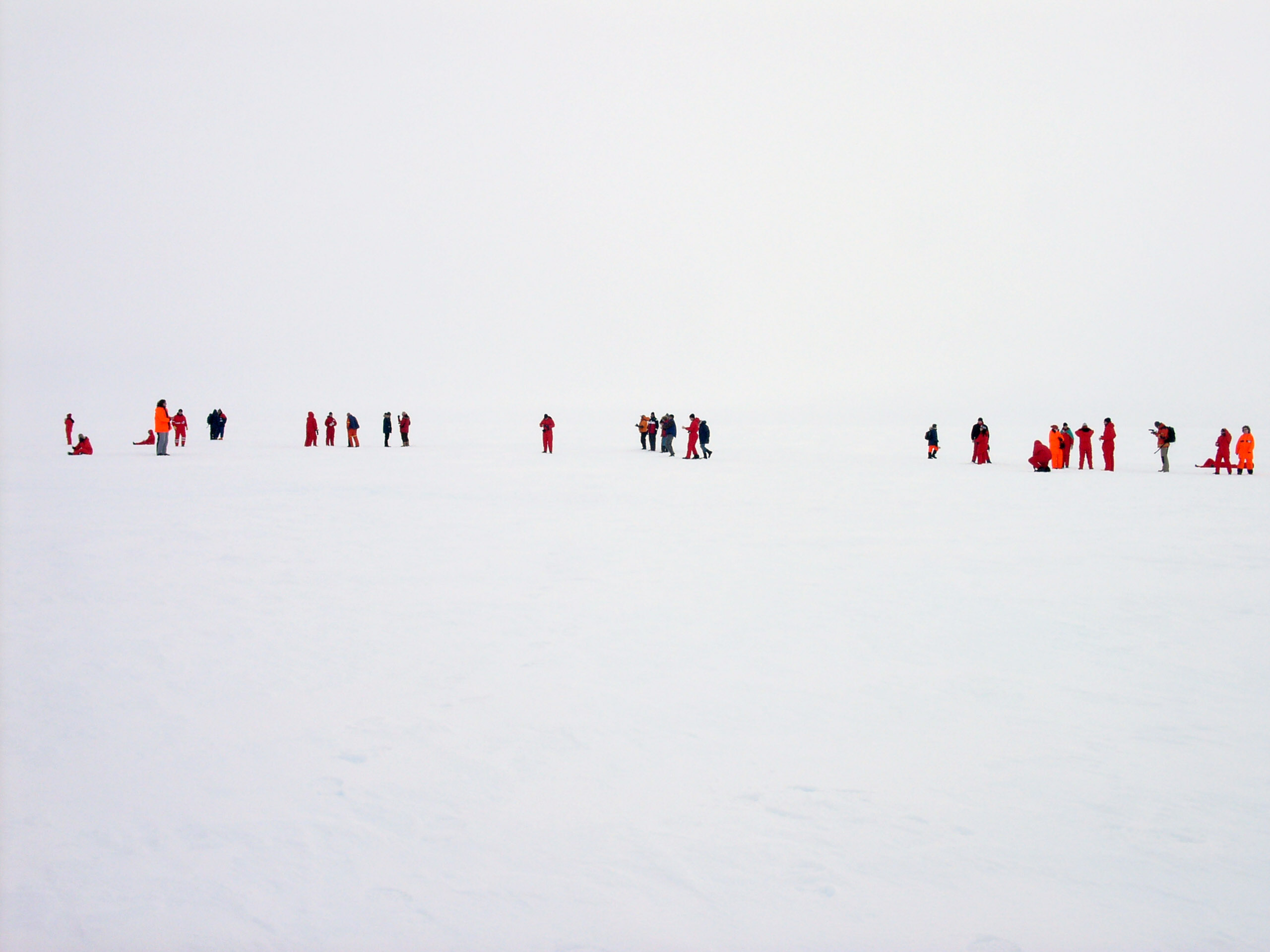
Flat-light on Ekström Shelf Ice, Antarctica

Flat-light is a diffusion of sunlight.

Cause: Sunlight is both scattered and diffused by atmospheric particles (e.g. water molecules, ice crystals) and by snow lying on the ground; this causes light to be received from multiple directions. Commonly, the effect is increased during a whiteout and/or later in the day when the sun drops towards the horizon, due to sunlight passing through the atmosphere for a greater distance.

Result: Light is received from multiple directions with each light source producing overlapping shadows which cancel-out each other. This dulls the area and removes indicators such as tones and contrast, making it difficult to discern similarly coloured slope features. The loss of visual indicators of shape and edge detail results in objects and features seeming to blend into each other, producing a flat featureless vista. An effect of visual blending may be a loss of depth of field resulting in disorientation.

== Hazards ==
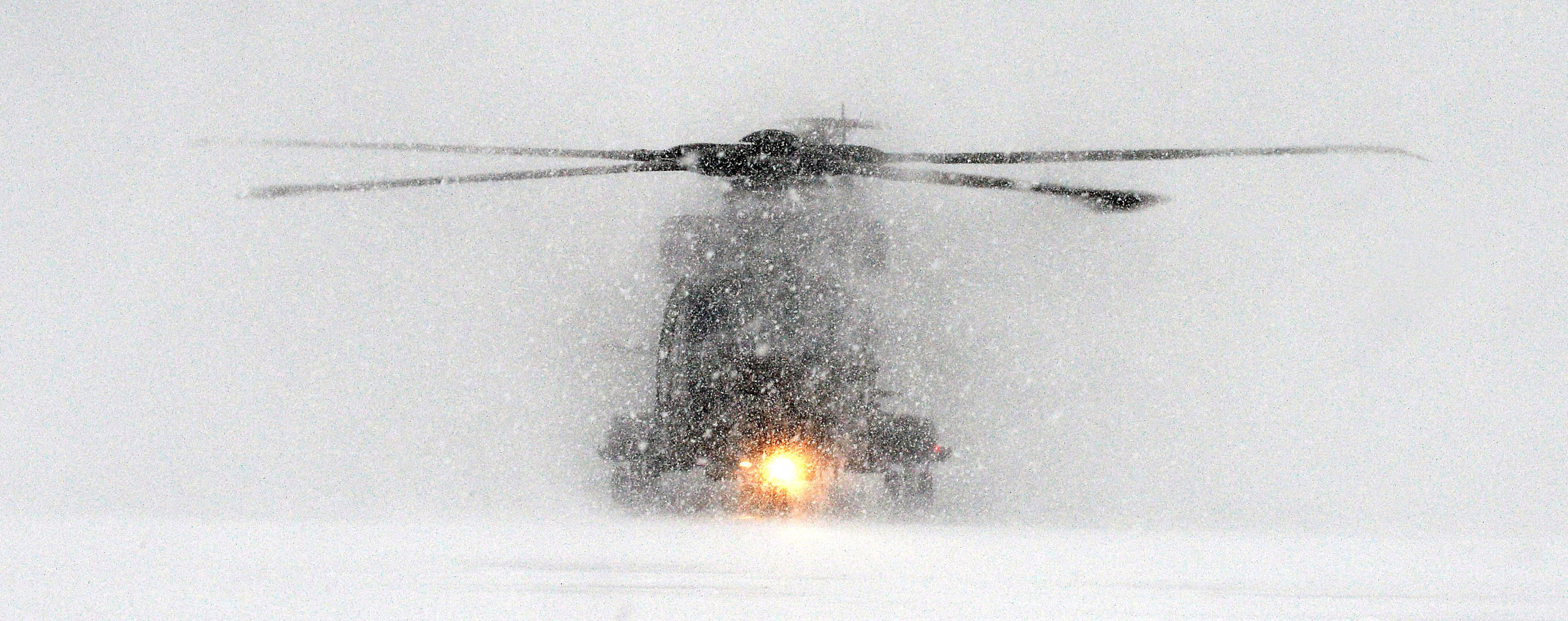
Helicopter causing a whiteout with its rotor down-wash

Whiteout conditions pose threats to mountain climbers, skiers, aviation, and mobile ground traffic. Motorists, especially those on large high-speed routes, are also at risk. There have been many major multiple-vehicle collisions associated with whiteout conditions. One forward motorist may come to a complete stop when they cannot see the road, while the motorist behind is still moving.

Local, short-duration whiteout conditions can be created artificially in the vicinity of airports and helipads due to aircraft operations. Snow on the ground can be stirred up by helicopter rotor down-wash or airplane jet blast, presenting hazards to both aircraft and bystanders on the ground.

== See also ==
- Air New Zealand Flight 901, an air accident on Mount Erebus, Antarctica in 1979 caused in part by whiteout conditions.
- Black ice
- Snowsquall
