= Thundersnow =

Thunderstorm during which there is snowfall

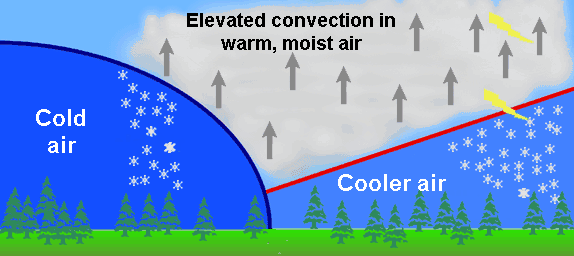
Thundersnow formation with an occluded front

Thundersnow, also known as a winter thunderstorm or a thundersnow storm, is a thunderstorm in which snow falls as the primary precipitation instead of rain. It is considered a rare phenomenon. It typically falls in regions of strong upward motion within the cold sector of an extratropical cyclone. Thermodynamically, it is not different from any other type of thunderstorm, but the top of the cumulonimbus cloud is usually quite low. In addition to snow, graupel or hail may fall as well. The heavy snowfall tends to muffle the sound of the thunder so that it sounds more like a low rumble than the loud, sharp bang that is heard during regular thunderstorms.

Thundersnow can occur during a normal snowstorm that sustains strong vertical mixing which allows for favorable conditions for lightning and thunder to occur. It can also occur from the lake effect or ocean effect thunderstorm which is produced by cold air passing over relatively warm water; this effect commonly produces snow squalls over the Great Lakes.

== Occurrence ==
=== Americas ===
Within the United States, thundersnow is relatively rare but most common in "eastern Nevada and Utah, the central plains, and the Great Lakes states". Thundersnow also occurs in Nova Scotia and in the Northeastern United States, especially in New England and New York, sometimes several times per winter season. On December 30, 2019, a severe thunderstorm warning was issued for parts of Massachusetts for a thunderstorm cell that was producing "lightning, thundersnow, thundersleet, and thunderice". A "really rare" thundersnow storm occurred near Vancouver, British Columbia on December 17–18, 2022.

The South Region of Brazil registered episodes of thundersnow in 1984 and 2005, in the state of Santa Catarina, and in August 2011, in some municipalities of the highland region of Serra Gaúcha, in the southern state of Rio Grande do Sul.

=== Europe ===
The British Isles and other parts of northwestern Europe occasionally report thunder and lightning during sleet or (usually wet) snow showers during winter and spring. Scotland registered an episode of thundersnow in the early hours of 4 December 2020, the unusual noise causing alarm among local people. The Met Office warned of thundersnow in Scotland, Wales and northern England in early January 2022.

Western Europe has rare occurrences of thundersnow, as on 8 March 2010, when northeastern Catalonia, including Barcelona, experienced a heavy snowfall accompanied by lightning, with snow depths surpassing 30 centimetres (12 in) in low altitude areas.

In Central Europe, a large-area (non-local) thundersnow occurred on 17 January 2022, when a strong synoptic-scale squall line passed north to south over whole central and eastern Poland, precipitating both granular snow and snowflakes, with discharge intensity exceeding 100 per minute. Other recent occurrences were in Poland and the Czech Republic in January 2023, Germany in January 2021, and Norway and Netherlands as well as Austria in April 2021, with previous occurrences in Norway in January 2019 and January 2020. Stockholm experienced thundersnow on 21 November 2022. It was detected once again in the Netherlands on 3 January 2026.

=== Asia ===
Low-pressure events in the eastern Mediterranean that originate from polar origin cause copious thundersnow occurrences during winter storms, especially over the elevated provinces of Israel, Jordan and Lebanon, including Amman and Jerusalem. When such storms happen at areas intended for skiing, the mountains are often evacuated for safety.

Thundersnow is also common around Kanazawa and the Sea of Japan, and even around Mount Everest.

== Formation ==
Thundersnow is caused by the same mechanisms as regular thunderstorms, but it is much more rare because cold dense air is less likely to rise.

=== Lake effect precipitation ===
A large squall producing heavy snow and frequent lightning over Buffalo, NY.

Lake effect thundersnow occurs after a cold front or shortwave aloft passes over a body of water. This steepens the thermal lapse rates between the lake temperature and the temperatures aloft. A difference in temperature of 25 °C (45 °F) or more between the lake temperature and the temperature at about 1,500 m (4,900 ft) (the 850 hPa level) usually marks the onset of thundersnow, if surface temperatures are expected to be below freezing. However several factors, including other geographical elements, affect the development of thundersnow.

The primary factor is convective depth. This is the vertical depth in the troposphere that a parcel of air will rise from the ground before it reaches the equilibrium (EQL) level and stops rising. A minimum depth of 1,500 m (4,900 ft) is necessary, and an average depth of 3,000 m (9,800 ft) or more is generally accepted as sufficient. Wind shear is also a significant factor. Linear snow squall bands produce more thundersnow than clustered bands; thus a directional wind shear with a change of less than 12° between the ground and 2,000 m (6,600 ft) in height must be in place. However, any change in direction greater than 12° through that layer will tear the snow squall apart. A bare minimum fetch of 50 km/h (31 mph) is required so that the air passing over the lake or ocean water will become sufficiently saturated with moisture and will acquire thermal energy from the water.

The last component is the echo top or storm top temperature. This must be at least −30 °C (−22 °F). It is generally accepted that at this temperature there is no longer any super cooled water vapour present in a cloud, but just ice crystals suspended in the air. This allows for the interaction of the ice cloud and graupel pellets within the storm to generate a charge, resulting in lightning and thunder.

=== Synoptic forcing ===
Synoptic snow storms tend to be large and complex, with many possible factors affecting the development of thundersnow. The best location in a storm to find thundersnow is typically in its Northwest quadrant (in the Northern Hemisphere, based on observations in the Midwestern United States), within what is known as the "comma head" of a mature extratropical cyclone. Thundersnow can also be located underneath the TROWAL, a trough of warm air aloft which shows up in a surface weather analysis as an inverted trough extending backward into the cold sector from the main cyclone. In extreme cases, thunderstorms along the cold front are transported towards the center of the low-pressure system and will have their precipitation change to snow or ice, once the cold front becomes a portion of the occluded front. The 1991 Halloween blizzard, Superstorm of 1993, and White Juan are examples of such blizzards featuring thundersnow.

=== Upslope flow ===
Similar to the lake effect regime, thundersnow is usually witnessed in terrain in the cold sector of an extratropical cyclone when a shortwave aloft moves into the region. The shortwave will steepen the local lapse rates, allowing for a greater possibility of both heavy snow at elevations where it is near or below freezing, and occasionally thundersnow.

== Hazards ==
Thundersnow produces heavy snowfall rates in the range of 5 to 10 cm (2 to 4 in) per hour. Snowfall of this intensity may limit visibilities severely, even during light wind conditions. However, thundersnow is often a part of a severe winter storm or blizzard. Winds of above tropical storm force are frequent with thundersnow. As a result, visibilities in thundersnow are frequently under 400 m (1/4 mi). Additionally, such wind creates extreme wind chills and may result in frostbite. Finally, there is a greater likelihood that thundersnow lightning will have a positive polarity, which is associated with a greater destructive potential than the more common negatively-charged lightning. That said, lightning is far less frequent in a thundersnow storm than in a summertime storm, and is usually of the cloud-to-cloud variety, rather than a strike that travels to the ground.

== See also ==
- Blizzard warning
- Severe thunderstorm warning
- Severe weather terminology (United States)
