= Akimoto Lake =

Lake in Fukushima Prefecture, Japan

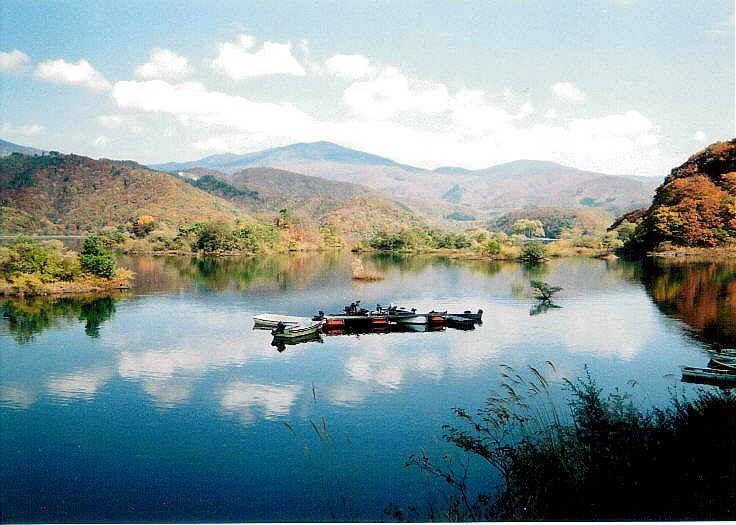

- Location within Fukushima Prefecture
- Location: Fukushima Prefecture, Japan
- Coordinates: 37.656°N 140.135°E
- Type: Freshwater, mesotrophic
- Surface area: 3.6 km^{2} (1.4 sq mi)
- Max. depth: 34.1 m (112 ft)
- Water volume: 0.04 km^{3} (0.0096 cu mi)
- Shore length^{1}: 24.0 km (14.9 mi)
- Surface elevation: 736.0 m (2,414.7 ft)
- ^{1} Shore length is not a well-defined measure.

Akimoto Lake (秋元湖) is located in Fukushima Prefecture, Japan. Straddling the border between the village of Kitashiobara and the town of Inawashiro, it serves as a reservoir, supplying drinking water to local residents. Along with Hibara Lake and Onogawa Lake, it constitutes the "Inner Bandai Plateau Tri-Lake Formation" of the Bandai Highland.

== Overview ==
The lake did not exist during the Meiji period in the area now known as the "Inner Bandai Plateau", which was once the site of the village of Hibara. In 1888, Mount Bandai, located to the south, erupted, causing part of the mountainside to cave in due to a phreatic explosion. Initially, it was believed that a single large phreatic explosion caused the destruction. However, it is now thought that the damage resulted from several medium-sized explosions.

The resulting rockslide, which turned into a mudslide, created a natural dam that blocked the flow of the Nagase and Onogawa rivers into the Inner Bandai area, causing it to flood. Hibara Village became submerged under the new Lake Hibara, and other dammed lakes such as Lake Onogawa and Goshiki Marsh also formed. Akimoto Lake was created by the damming of the Ōkura and Nakatsu rivers. It is the deepest of the lakes in the Inner Bandai tri-lake area and is second to Lake Hibara in surface area.

Akimoto Lake receives water from the Nagase River, which forms a delta at its lower section before flowing into Lake Inawashiro. Water then flows from Lake Inawashiro into the Nippashi River, which connects to the Agano River at Kitakata City. Due to this water flow path, Akimoto Lake is designated under the River Act as part of the Agano River water system and is managed as a Class-1 water system by Fukushima Prefecture.

== Tourism ==
Akimoto Lake, along with Lake Hibara, Lake Onogawa, Goshiki Marsh, and others, is designated as part of Bandai-Asahi National Park, a major tourist destination in the Aizu region. The changing colors of the fall leaves, which reflect vividly on the water's surface, are particularly noteworthy. Caution is advised as visitors flock to the area in the fall, causing traffic jams along Route 459, which leads to the Inner Bandai tri-lake area. The sunrise over Akimoto Lake is a favorite subject for photographers, and many visit in the morning to capture the scenery in the morning light.

Boating is permitted on Akimoto Lake, with boats available for rent on a time-limited basis. Fishing is allowed, but the number of smallmouth bass—an invasive species—has been increasing in recent years. This growth attracts bass fishing enthusiasts and has also drawn concern from the local fishing co-op, which views the species as a threat to local aquatic insects and indigenous fish. A bicycling path runs along the shore of Akimoto Lake, providing access to the Nakatsu ravine in the upper reaches of the Nakatsu River. The lake also features a campground and is popular as a general outdoor recreation area.

Akimoto Lake is accessible via the Ban-etsu Expressway or the Inawashiro-Bandai Highland Interchange. Take Route 115, transfer to Route 459, turn right at the Goshiki Marsh Entrance, and continue straight. If coming from Mount Adatara, take Route 115, turn right at the Takamori intersection, and proceed straight on Fukushima Prefectural Road 70 (the Fukushima-Azuma-Inner Bandai line) before transferring to the Bandai-Azuma Lake Line. This route offers views of the upper reaches of Akimoto Lake.

For public transportation, take JR East's Ban-etsu West Line to Inawashiro Station or Kitakata Station. From there, board the Bandai Toto Bus heading to Inner Bandai, get off at Akimoto Lake Entrance, and continue on foot.

=== Hydroelectricity production ===
The Agano River water system, of which Akimoto Lake is a part, has a substantial water flow and a swift current, making it ideal for hydroelectric power generation. In 1889, the first hydroelectric power production in the Agano River water system began with the opening of the Numagami Hydroelectric Plant, which operated through the Asaka Aqueduct.

Later, during the Taishō period, the Inawashiro Hydroelectric Energy Company began full-scale hydroelectric power production on Lake Inawashiro and the Nippashi River. In 1914, it inaugurated Inawashiro Electric Plant #1, which was the largest hydroelectric plant in Japan at the time and successfully completed an overhead high-tension power transmission line to Tokyo. Inawashiro Electric Plant #2 was constructed in 1918, followed by Plant #3 in 1926, further advancing the development of Lake Inawashiro and the Nippashi River.

The Inner Bandai tri-lake area attracted attention due to its abundant water resources, leading to plans in 1923 for additional hydroelectric power generation on Onogawa Lake and Akimoto Lake. The Onogawa Power Plant, completed in 1937, utilized a tunnel to transfer water from Onogawa Lake, achieving an output of 34,200 kW. Construction on Akimoto Lake also began, but the wartime Energy Management Act of 1939 mandated the consolidation of electric companies into the Japan Electric Generation and Transmission Company. Under this company, construction continued, and the Akimoto Power Plant was completed in 1940. To ensure an effective energy supply, an earth dam was built to increase the lake's storage capacity. When completed, Akimoto Power Plant had a permitted output of 107,500 kW, which was the highest on the Agano River water system at that time.

After the war, Japan Electric Generation and Transmission was designated for breakup under the Economic Decentralization Act. In 1951, it was split into nine smaller electric companies. The hydroelectric plants around Lake Inawashiro were placed under the management of Tokyo Electric Power Company, Inc., where they remain today. Tokyo Electric Power Company has adjusted the water level of Akimoto Lake in response to requests from Fukushima Prefecture.

== Multi-purpose dam ==
Akimoto Lake Reservoir
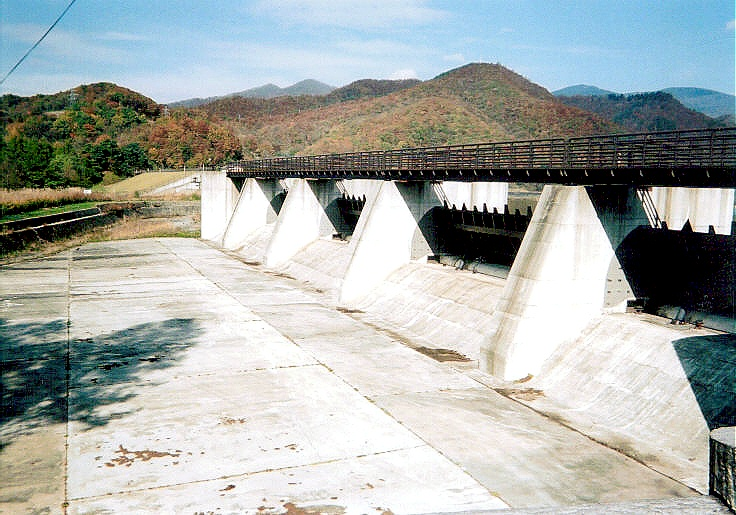
- Interactive map of Akimoto Lake Reservoir
- Location: Fukushima Prefecture, Japan
- Construction began: 1997
- Opening date: 1999

Dam and spillways
- Impounds: Nagase River
- Height: 10.6 m (35 ft)

Reservoir
- Total capacity: 37,924,000 m^{3} (1.3393×10^{9} cu ft)
- Catchment area: 250.2 km^{2} (96.6 sq mi)
- Surface area: 41.6 ha (103 acres)
- Purposes: Flood control, unspecified water use, hydroelectricity

In August 1989, the Inner Bandai area experienced heavy torrential rains. The water levels at Akimoto Lake, Lake Onogawa, and Lake Hibara rose rapidly, causing major damage to the entire river basin. Although Akimoto Lake has a drainage pumping station at the center of the dam to discharge excess water, the torrential rains exceeded the station's capacity to pump water, making it impossible to regulate the water level properly. Excessive water discharge, beyond what was permissible under water use regulations, led to the flooding of the Nagase River and further damage to the surrounding region.

Fukushima Prefecture, alarmed by the rapid river overflow, developed new flood prevention plans for the Inner Bandai tri-lake area. Due to environmental protection concerns related to the nearby Bandai-Asahi National Park, the construction of levees or dikes was not feasible. Instead, it was decided to build a multi-purpose dam to manage water utilization, control flooding for Lake Hibara, Lake Onogawa, and Akimoto Lake, and maintain normal stream levels for the Nagase River. Work on this project began in 1997 under the Comprehensive River Development Project.

The practice of damming natural lakes for flood prevention and water usage is common nationwide. Notable examples include Lake Biwa, the Seta River Wash Weir, Lake Kasumigaura, and the Hitachi River floodgate, all under the direct control of the Ministry of Land, Infrastructure, Transport and Tourism. Other examples, such as Lake Chūzenji/Chūzenji Dam in Tochigi Prefecture and Yogo Lake/Yogo Dam in Shiga Prefecture, are managed at the prefectural level. In Fukushima Prefecture, natural lakes that are dammed include Lake Inawashiro and the Jyūryoku Bridge floodgate. Lake Hibara now features a 3.4-meter-high gravity dam, Lake Onogawa has a 4.9-meter-high fill dam, and Akimoto Lake—along with its earth dam—now includes a gravity dam with an emergency floodgate on its left bank, making it a combined dam. Facilities such as dams, weirs, and floodgates enable flood prevention and water management for natural lakes and marshes, and are collectively referred to as "water level regulation facilities." Although places like Akimoto Lake are technically lakes, they are classified as dams under river-related regulations.

Although each structure is less than 15 meters in height and is technically classified as a weir under river law, they provide valuable services in flood prevention and hydroelectricity generation for the Nagase River, Akimoto Lake, and the other lakes in the Inner Bandai tri-lake area. The construction of the secondary dam was completed in 1999. Following this, the regulation of water levels, which had previously been managed by Tokyo Electric Power Company, was taken over directly by the Inawashiro office of civil engineering in Fukushima Prefecture.

== Related links ==
- List of lakes and marshes in Japan
- Dammed lakes
- Mount Bandai
- Bandai-Asahi National Park
- Agano River water system
