= Lake Onogawa =

Lake in Fukushima, Japan

Coordinates: 37°40′21.7″N 140°05′51.7″E

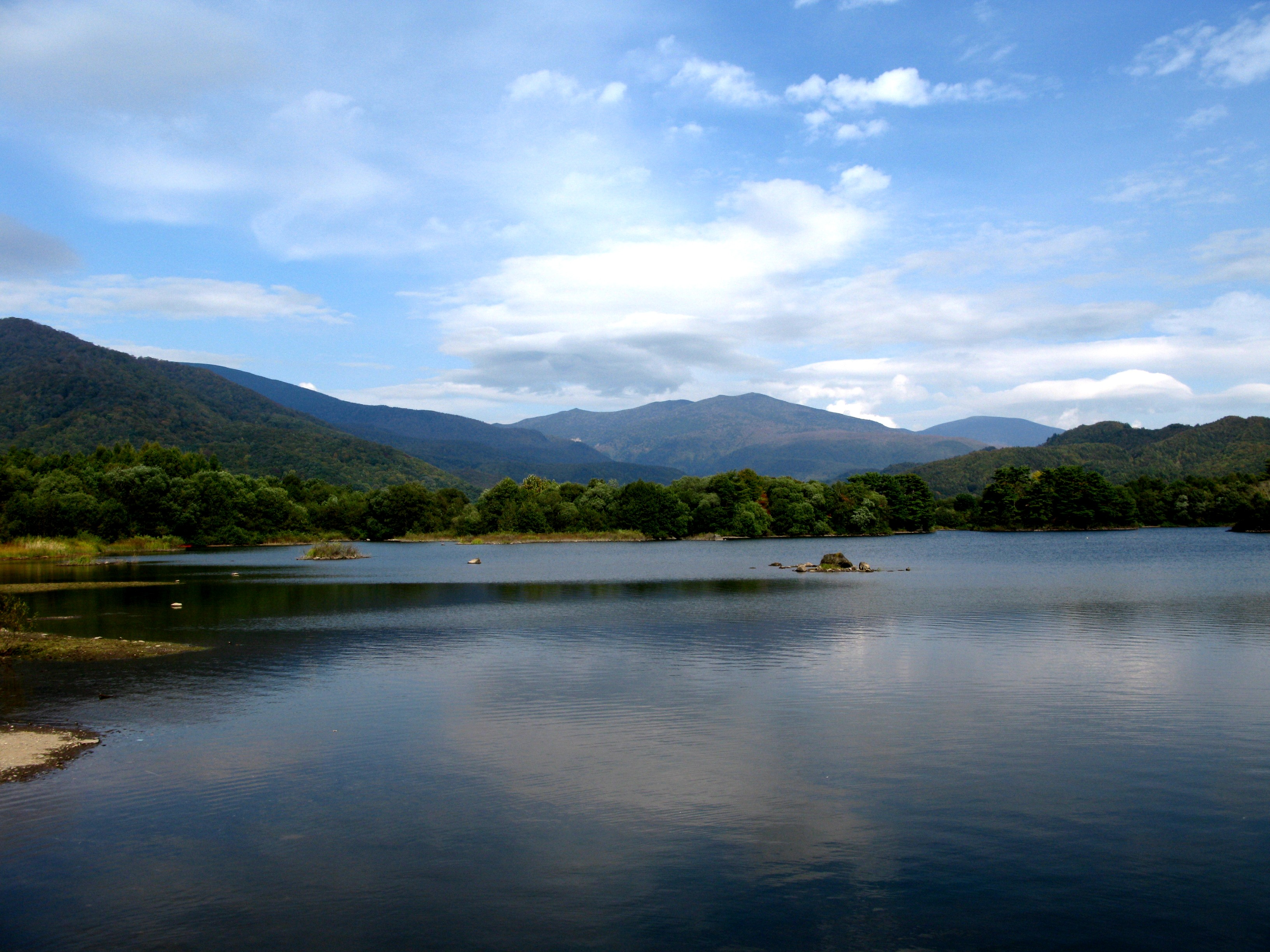
Lake Onogawa from its southwest shores

Lake Onogawa (Japanese: 小野川湖, Onogawa-ko), is a lake located in Kitashiobara, Fukushima, Japan. It is one of the three larger lakes in the Bandai Highland, the other two being Lake Hibara in its west and Lake Akimoto in its east.

Lake Onogawa is 3.5 km long east–west, and its area 1.72 square km. Dotted with several small islands, it is part of Bandai-Asahi National Park.

Lake Onogawa was created by the 1888 eruption of Mount Bandai, which dammed the Ono and Nagase Rivers (小野川 & 長瀬川). The Ono comes down, via the Onogawa Fudo Falls (小野川不動滝). from Mount Azuma (吾妻山) in the north. Its water was selected in 1985 as one of the 100 Best Waters (名水百選) by the Japanese Environmental Agency.

Lake Onogawa is a popular tourist destination for all seasons, with camping & canoeing in summer, and Japanese smelt fishing on the ice & snow field trekking in winter.

== Access ==
Lake Onogawa can be reached from Inawashiro Station of JR East's Ban'etsu West Line or from the Inawashiro-Bandaikogen Interchange of Ban-etsu Expressway.

== See also ==
- Bandai-Asahi National Park
- Bandai Highland
