= Mount Nekomadake =

Stratovolcano on the island of Honshu, Japan

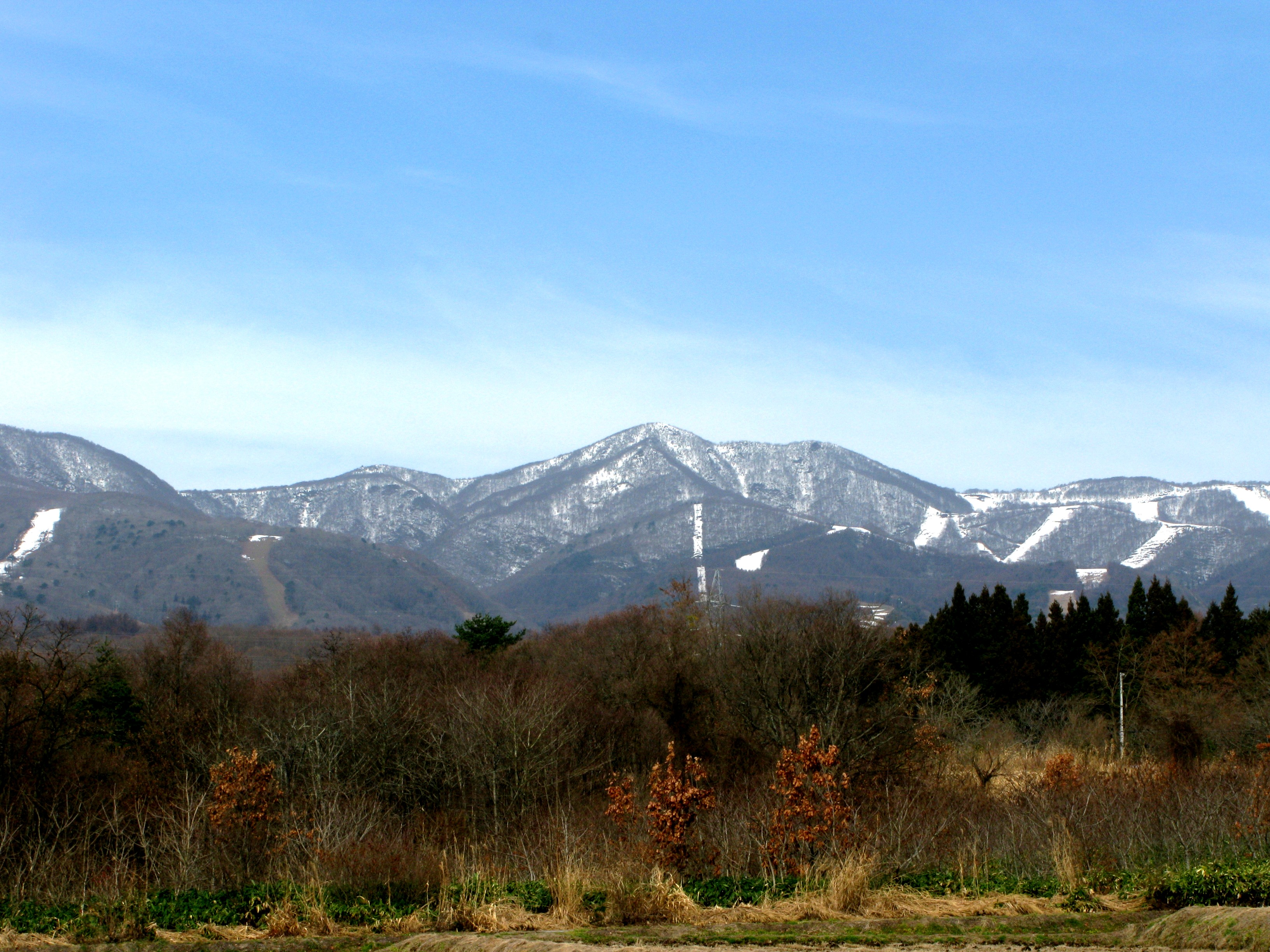
- SE side in winter

Highest point
- Elevation: 1,403.6 m (4,605 ft)
- Coordinates: 37°36′41.9″N 140°01′42.1″E

Naming
- Native name: 猫魔ヶ岳 (Japanese)

Geography
- Location within Japan Location within Fukushima Prefecture
- Location: Honshū, Japan

Geology
- Mountain type: Stratovolcano-Caldera

Climbing
- Easiest route: Happōdai Tozanguchi (八方台登山口)

Mount Nekomadake (猫魔ヶ岳, Nekoma-dake, Nekoma-gadake) is a stratovolcano located west of Mount Bandai, close to Bandai town and Kitashiobara village in the Fukushima Prefecture, Japan. It is 1,403.6 metres high, and close to Lake Inawashiro and Oguni-numa Pond. Nekoma volcano is thought to be 0.8 - 1 million years old.

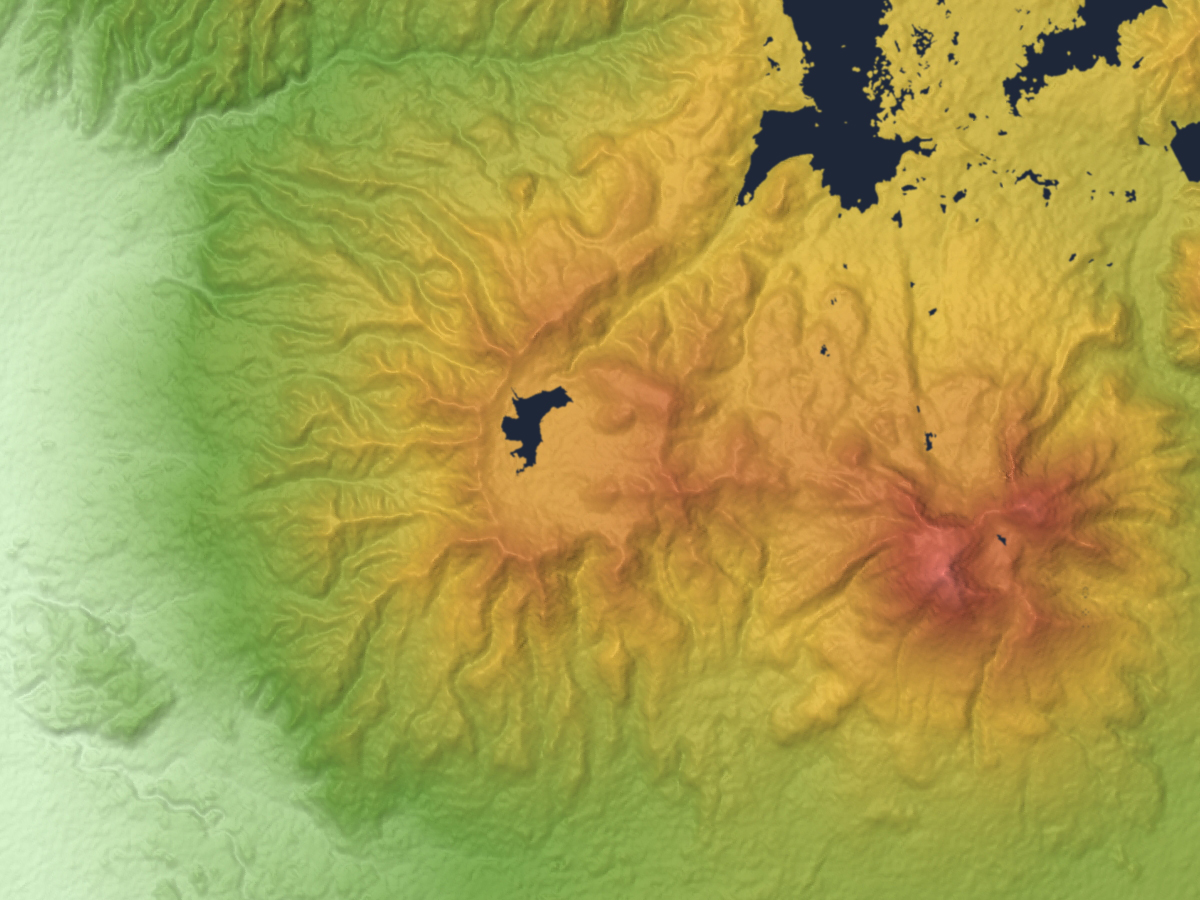
Nekoma volcano (center) Bandai volcano (right)

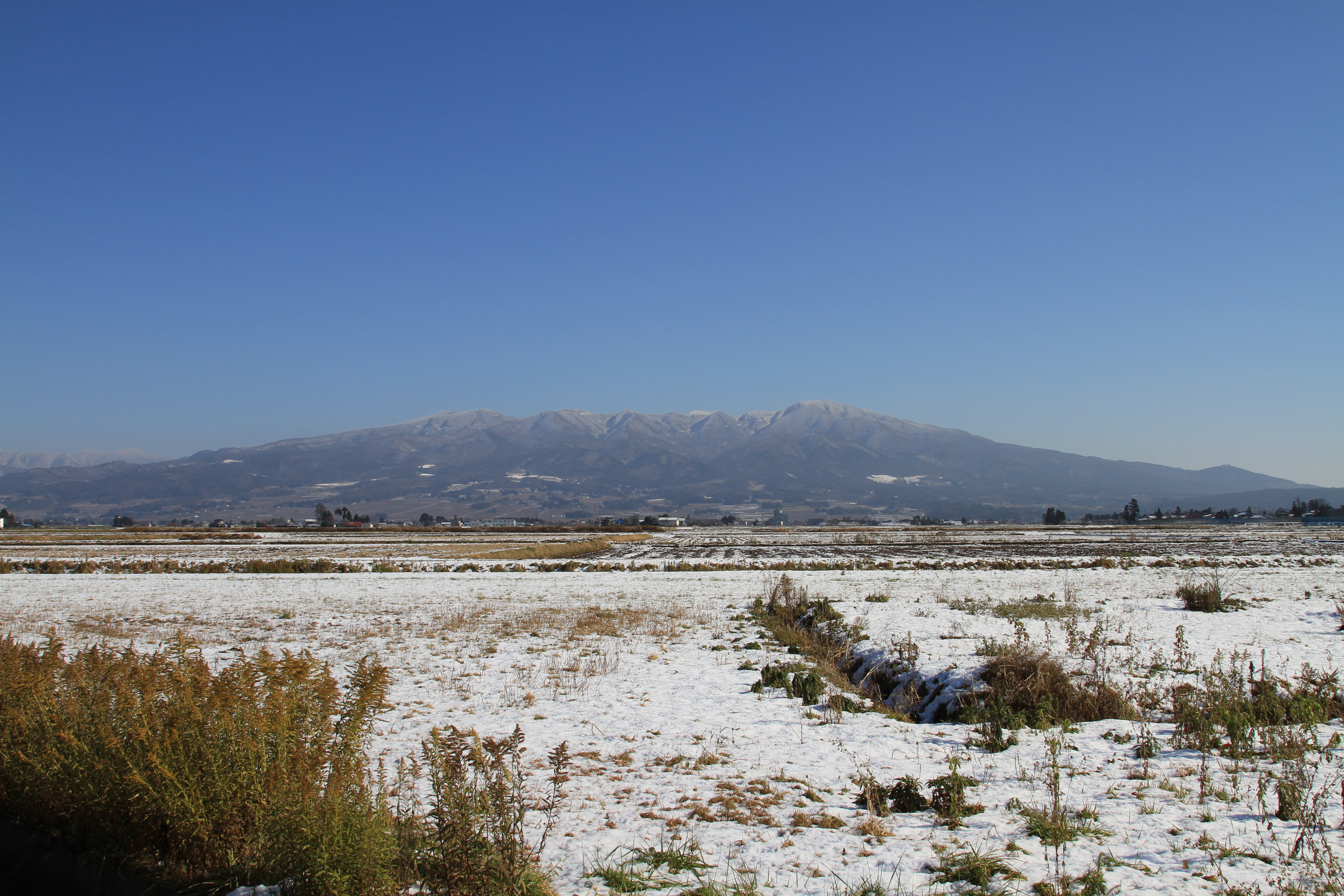
Nekoma volcano from the SW.

== See also ==
- List of volcanoes in Japan
- List of mountains in Japan
