= Morohashi Museum of Modern Art =

Art museum in Japan

- 諸橋近代美術館
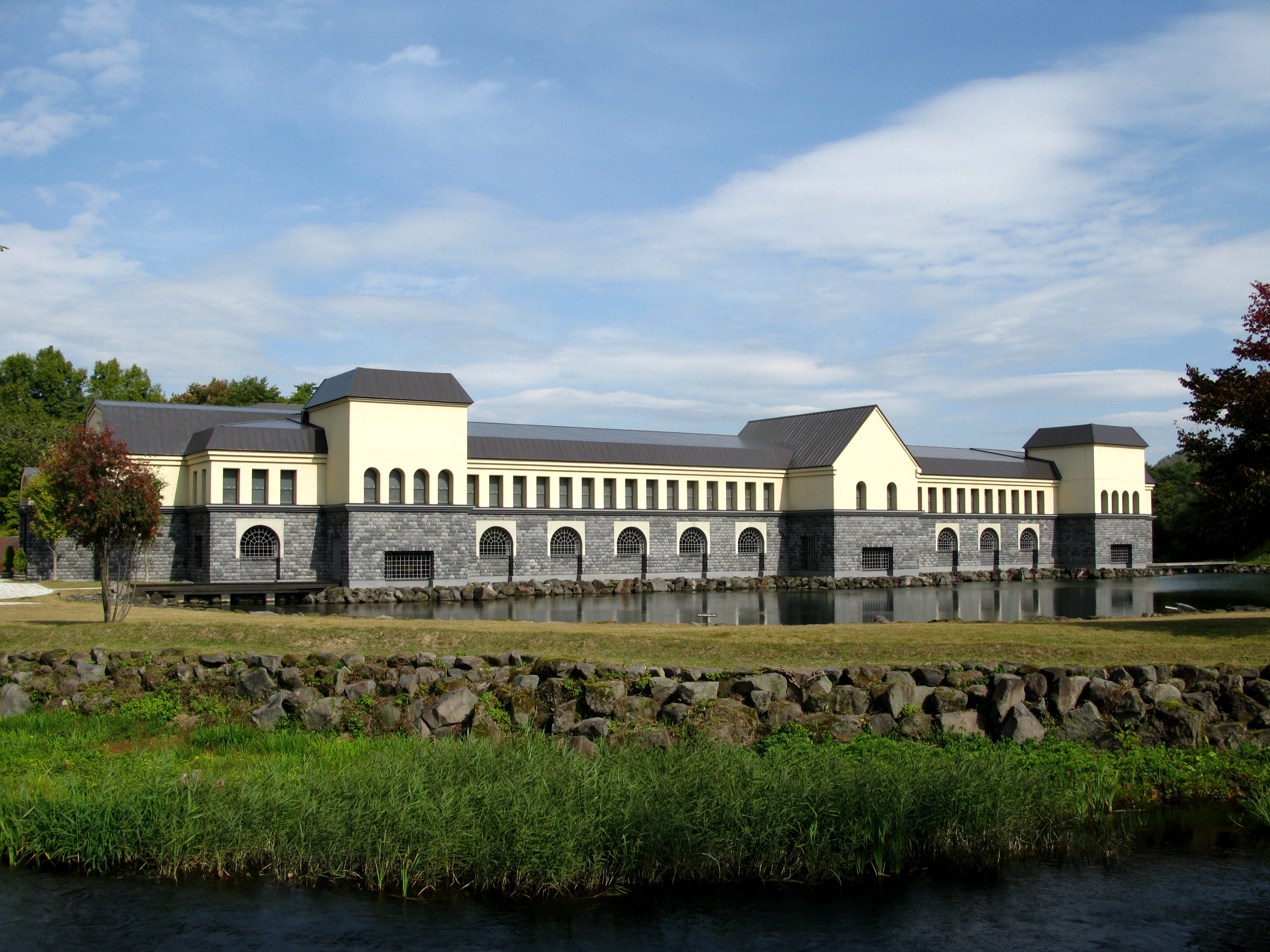
- The Morohashi Museum of Modern Art
- Interactive map of the Morohashi Museum of Modern Art area

General information
- Location: 1093-23 Aza-Kengamine, Ōaza-Hibara, Kitashiobara, Fukushima Prefecture, Japan
- Coordinates: 37°39′13″N 140°5′47″E
- Opened: 3 June 1999

Technical details
- Floor area: 2000 m^{2}

Website
- homepage

The Morohashi Museum of Modern Art (諸橋近代美術館, Morohashi Kindai Bijutsukan) is an art museum that opened in Kitashiobara, Fukushima Prefecture, Japan, in 1999. It is situated within Bandai-Asahi National Park, near Goshiki-numa, and with views of Mount Bandai. The permanent collection includes over three hundred forty pieces by Salvador Dalí, which makes it the third largest Dalí Museum in the world and the sole Dalí Museum in Asia. It also owns works by other painters, like Sisley, Cézanne, Renoir, Matisse and Picasso.

== History and collection ==
The museum was created based on the art collection of the Japanese entrepreneur Teizo Morohashi, the founder of the sports and apparel retailer XEBIO Corporation, whose headquarters is in Kōriyama. He was a passionate admirer of the work of Salvador Dalí and surrealism in general, and since 1991, he started purchasing a wide range of works by the artist, along other paintings by artists such as Henri Matisse, Marc Chagall and Pablo Picasso. He decided to create a museum to host his art collection, whose construction began in 1997, and was already completed the following year. In 1999, the Morohashi Museum of Modern Art opened to the public. The current director, Eiji Morohashi, is Teizo's eldest son. It is a registered museum facility.

The museum main focus is the artwork of Spanish painter Salvador Dalí, and because of that the URL of its official website is "Dali.jp". The museum has indeed an extensive collection of works by Dalí, with approximately 340 pieces, including paintings, sculptures and prints. It is the third largest Dalí museum in the world, after the Salvador Dalí Museum, in St. Petersburg, Florida, and the Dalí Theatre and Museum, in Figueres, Spain. The museum also has an important collection of other contemporary Western painters. The artworks were bought mostly from auction houses such as Christie's and Sotheby's.

The paintings by Dalí that are part of the museum's collection include: Cabaret Scene, The Battle of Tetouan, The Three Sphinxes of Bikini, Portrait of Gala and the Lobster, An Allegory of the Sunset Atmosphere, The Statue of Olympian Zeus, Landscape with Butterflies and Grapes, The Tower of Time with Butterflies, Portrait of Mrs. Jack Warner, Portrait of Ann Woodward, Girls in a Garden, among many others.

The sculptures include Image of the Universe, Profile of Time, The Persistence of Memory, The Snail and the Angel, Vision of an Angel, Woman with a Rose Head, Tribute to Newton, Alice in Wonderland, Cabinet in the Shape of an Anthropomorphic Body, Swan-Elephant, and Venus with Drawers.

== Other painters ==
The museum collection also includes around 30 paintings from other contemporary painters, specially since impressionism, such as Camille Pissarro, Pierre-Auguste Renoir, Alfred Sisley, Paul Cézanne, Vincent van Gogh, Pierre Bonnard, Maurice Utrillo, Henri Matisse, Georges Rouault, Pablo Picasso, Giorgio de Chirico, Joan Miró, Max Ernst, Marc Chagall, and Tsuguharu Foujita.
