= Bandai, Fukushima =

Bandai 磐梯町
- Town
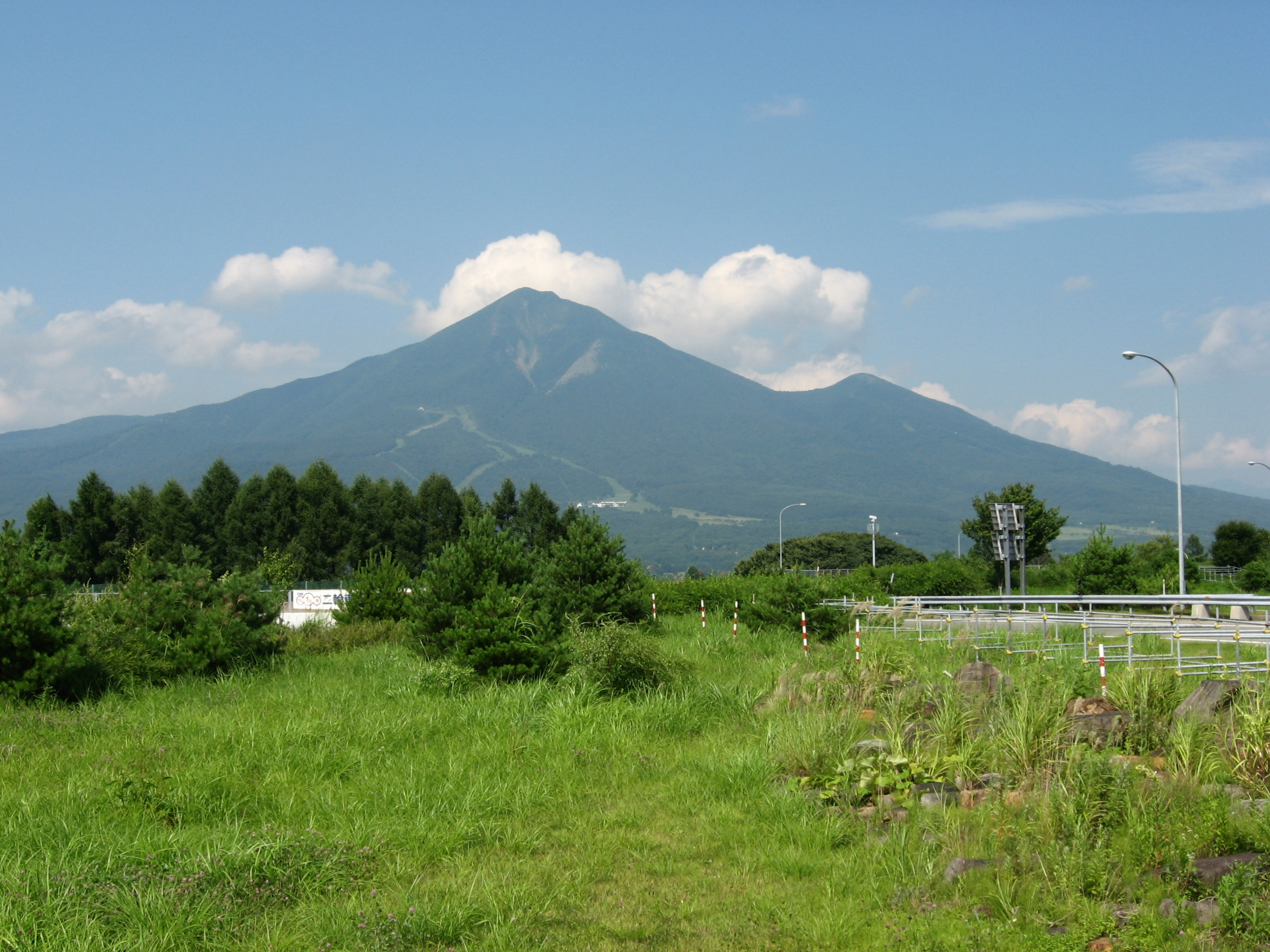
- Mount Bandai

- Flag Seal

- Location of Bandai in Fukushima Prefecture

- Coordinates: 37°33′43.5″N 139°59′19.2″E
- Country: Japan
- Region: Tōhoku
- Prefecture: Fukushima
- District: Yama

Area
  - Total: 59.77 km^{2} (23.08 sq mi)

Population (March 2018)
  - Total: 3,533
  - Density: 59.11/km^{2} (153.1/sq mi)
- Time zone: UTC+9 (Japan Standard Time)
- Phone number: 0242-74-1221
- Address: 1855 Bandai Naka-no-hashi Bandai-machi, Yama-gun, Fukushima-ken 969-3392
- Website: Official website

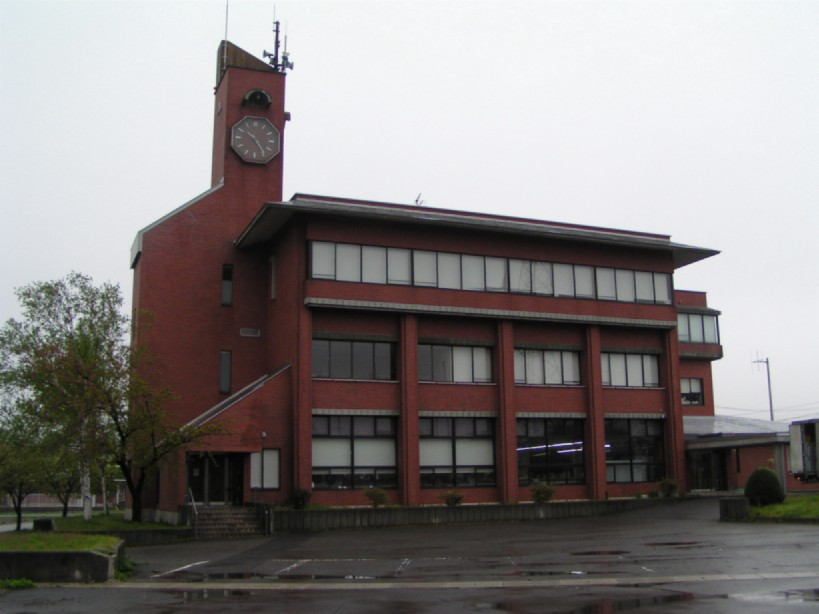
Bandai Town Hall

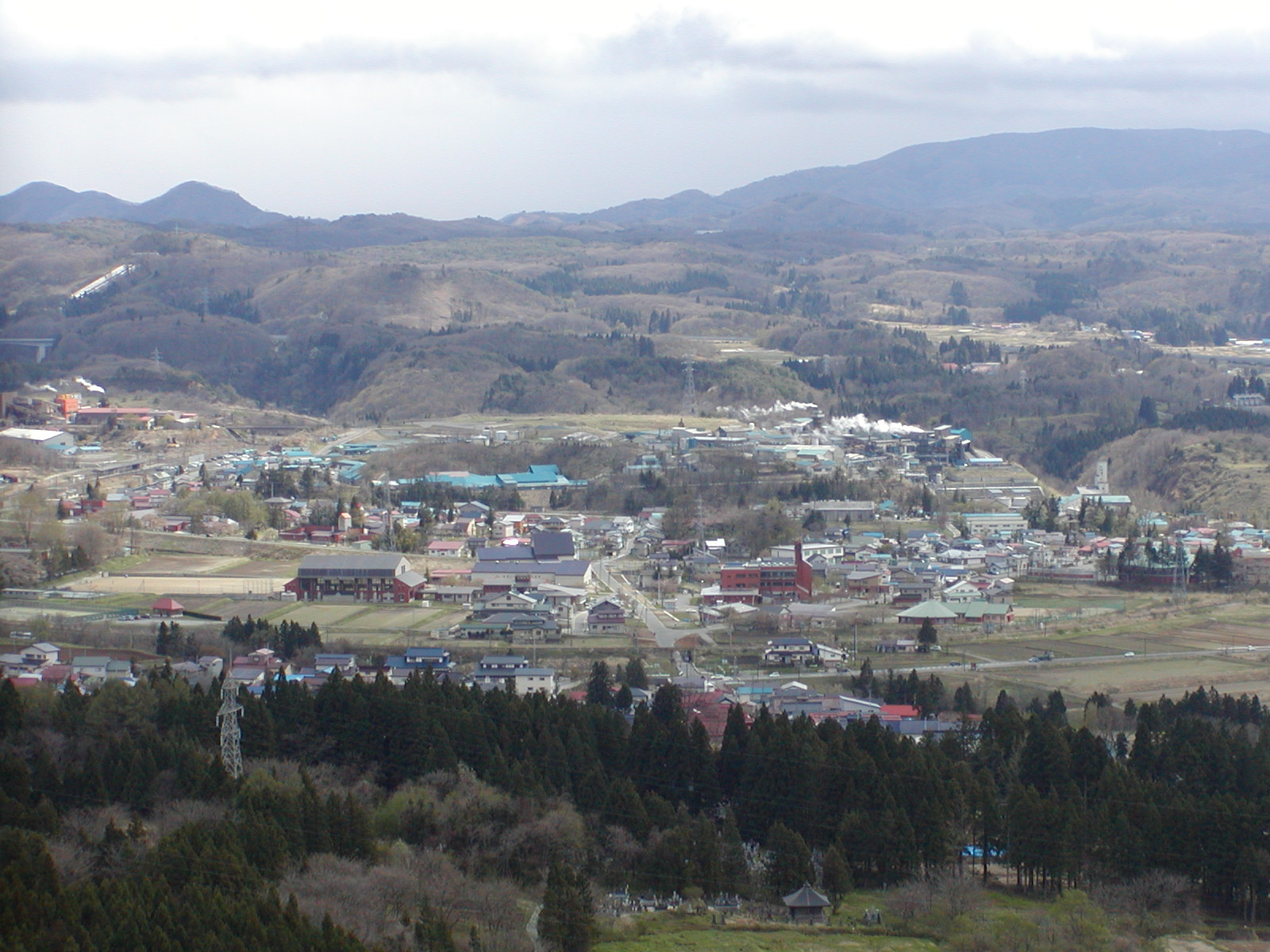
Panorama of Bandai town

Bandai (磐梯町, Bandai-machi) is a town located in Fukushima Prefecture, Japan. As of 1 March 2018, the town had an estimated population of 3,533 in 1195 households, and a population density of 60.3 persons per km^{2}. The total area of the town was 59.77 square kilometres (23.08 sq mi).

== Geography ==
Bandai is located in the northeastern part of the Aizu Basin, bordered by Yamagata Prefecture to the north. About 70% of the town is occupied by forests, with agricultural land and settlements along the hills at the southern foot of the mountains and along the Otani River. Much of the town is within the borders of the Bandai-Asahi National Park.

- Mountains : Mount Bandai, Mount Nekomadake
- Rivers : Nippashi-gawa, Oya-gawa

=== Neighboring municipalities ===
Fukushima Prefecture

- Aizuwakamatsu
- Inawashiro
- Kitakata
- Kitashiobara

== Climate ==
Bandai has a humid continental climate (Köppen Dfb) characterized by warm summers and cold winters with heavy snowfall. The average annual temperature in Bandai is 9.2 °C. The average annual rainfall is 1467 mm with September as the wettest month. The temperatures are highest on average in August, at around 22.7 °C, and lowest in January, at around −3.3 °C.

== Demographics ==
Per Japanese census data, the population of Bandai has declined steadily over the past 60 years and is now much less than it was a century ago.

Historical population
Year	Pop.	±%
1920	5,869	—
1930	5,353	−8.8%
1940	6,351	+18.6%
1950	7,601	+19.7%
1960	7,330	−3.6%
1970	5,263	−28.2%
1980	4,501	−14.5%
1990	4,338	−3.6%
2000	4,109	−5.3%
2010	3,762	−8.4%
2020	3,322	−11.7%

== History ==
The area of present-day Bandai was part of ancient Mutsu Province. It was the center of a mountain cult based on Mount Bandai and numerous Buddhist temples were founded from the Heian period. These temples grew to have a strong military and economic power towards the Kamakura period, and were only suppressed in the Sengoku period. The area formed part of the holdings of Aizu Domain during the Edo period. After the Meiji Restoration, it was organized as part of Yama District, Fukushima Prefecture. Bandai village was created on March 31, 1889 with the establishment of the modern municipalities system, and was raised to town status in 1960.

== Economy ==
From the early modern period, hydroelectric power generation and chemical production by Nippon Soda Co., Ltd. had been mainstays of the local economy. However, the local economy has now shifted to precision machinery production and seasonal tourism, especially golf courses and ski resorts.

== Education ==
Bandai has two public elementary schools and one public junior high school operated by the town government.

== Transportation ==
=== Railway ===
JR East – Ban'etsu West Line

- Bandaimachi

=== Highway ===
- Ban-etsu Expressway

== Sister cities ==
Oliver, British Columbia, Canada

== Local attractions ==
- Bandai-Asahi National Park
- Enichi-ji, noted Buddhist temple and National Historic Site
- Mount Bandai
