= Karahashi =

Karahashi (written: 唐橋) is a Japanese surname. Notable people with the surname include:

- Mitsuru Karahashi (唐橋 充, born 1977), Japanese actor
- Yumi Karahashi (唐橋 ユミ, born 1974), Japanese announcer and professor
