= Bandai Highland =

Plateau in Fukushima, Japan

Coordinates: 37°37′47.03″N 139°58′42.54″E

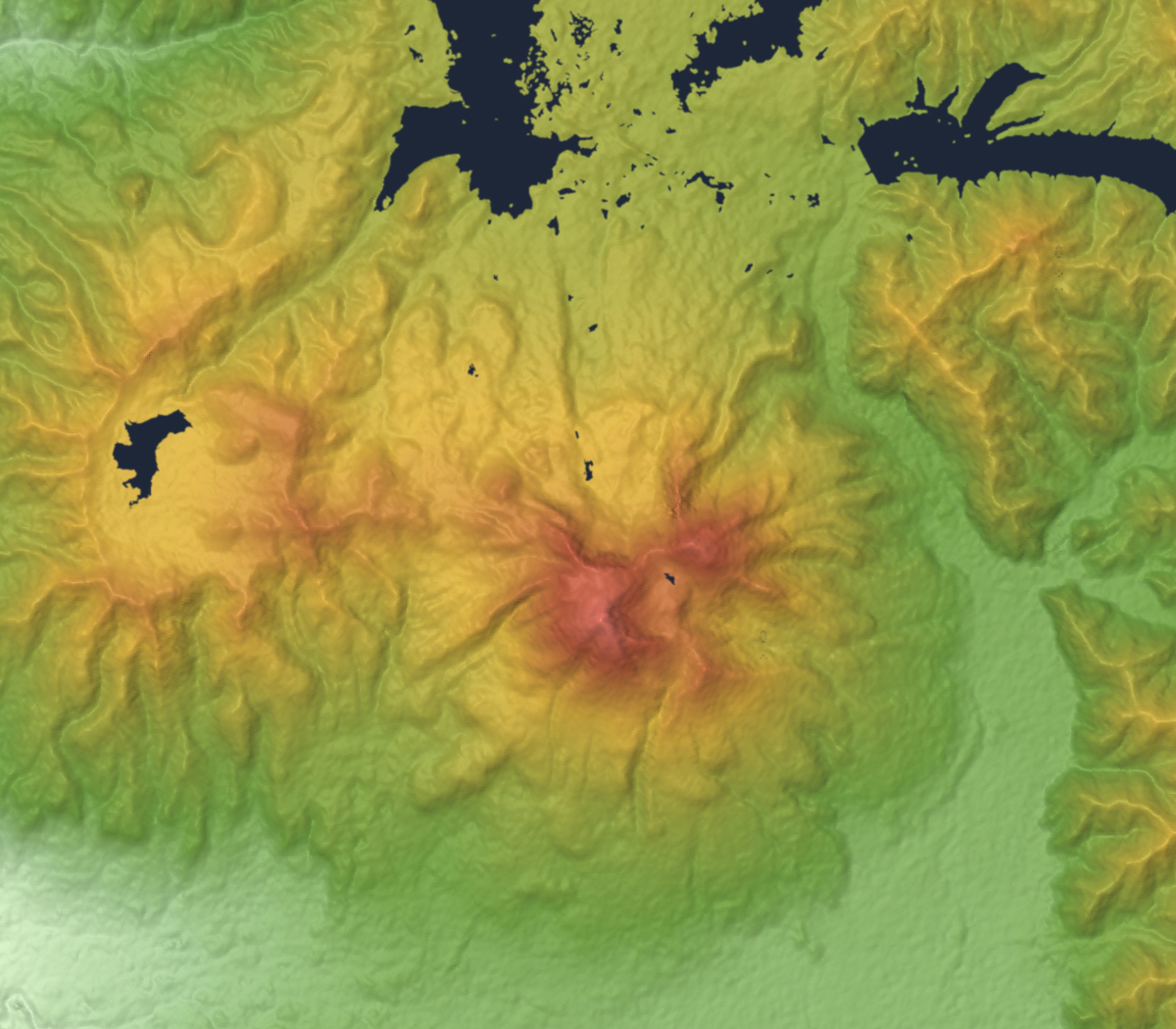
The Bandai Highland, Fukushima, Japan, containing Lakes Hibara, Onogawa & Akimoto, and other smaller lakes, such as Goshiki-numa, on the north (upper) side of Mount Bandai (center), is a popular resort area.

The Bandai Highland (Japanese: 磐梯高原, Bandai Kōgen), also called Urabandai (裏磐梯), is a plateau on the north side of Mount Bandai, at an elevation of 800 meters above sea level, in West Fukushima, Japan. It is surrounded on other sides by Mount Adatara and Mount Azuma (吾妻山), and is part of Bandai-Asahi National Park.

The plateau was made by the 1888 eruption of Mount Bandai, which dammed the Nagase River (長瀬川) and its tributaries to create Lake Hibara, Lake Onogawa, Lake Akimoto, and other smaller lakes, such as Goshiki-numa.

The Bandai Highland is a popular resort area for all seasons, including winter for Alpine and Nordic skiing.

== Access ==
The Bandai Highland can be reached from Inawashiro Station of JR East's Ban'etsu West Line or from the Inawashiro-Bandaikogen Interchange of Ban-etsu Expressway.

== See also ==
- Bandai-Asahi National Park
