= Cabaret Scene =

1922 painting by Salvador Dalí

- Artist: Salvador Dalí
- Year: 1922
- Medium: Oil on canvas
- Dimensions: 52 cm × 41 cm (20 in × 16 in)
- Location: Morohashi Museum of Modern Art; Fukushima

Cabaret Scene is an oil on canvas painting by the Spanish surrealist Salvador Dalí, executed in 1922. It is held at the Morohashi Museum of Modern Art, in Fukushima. It was a cubist experiment that came between Dalí's early impressionist work and the classic surrealist technique he later developed. Dalí was inspired by Pablo Picasso after he was expelled from the School of Fine Arts in Spain.

== See also ==
- List of works by Salvador Dalí
