= Yumi Karahashi =

Japanese announcer (born 1974)

- 唐橋 ユミ
- Born: October 22, 1974 (age 51); Kitakata, Fukushima, Japan
- Occupation: Announcer
- Years active: 1999–present
- Agent: Sankei
- Spouse: Katsuo Naruse (m. 2023)
- Website: Official profile

Yumi Karahashi (唐橋 ユミ, Karahashi Yumi; born October 22, 1974) is a Japanese announcer represented by talent agency Sankei. She is also a professor at Josai International University.

== Personal life ==
Karahashi was born in Kitakata, Fukushima. On March 21, 2023, she announced her marriage to film director Katsuo Naruse.

== Appearances ==
=== TV and radio series ===
Year	Title	Role	Network
2004	Sunday Morning	TBS	
2013	Katari no Gekijō Gutto Life	NHK Radio 1	Biweekly Monday
2014	Sennyuu Kan	TV Tokyo	
2015	Rediscover Japan	TBS	

==== Former ====
As a regular

Year	Title	Network	Notes
1999	Maru Toku	TUF	
2002	News no Mori Fukushima	TUF	
2008	Terumi Yoshida Sokodaijinatoko	NCB	
2011	Koko ga Kikitai! Meii ni Q	NHK E	
2013	DoCoMo Dankai Kurabu	NCB	
2014	S: Saigo no Keikan	TBS	
2014	High Noon TV Viking!	Fuji TV	

In other roles

Year	Title	Network	Notes
2009	Junji Takada Michiko Kawai no Tokyo Paradise	NCB	Guest appearance
2010	Kunimaru Wide go Zen-sama	NCB	
2011	Ouran High School Host Club	TBS	Episode 2
2011	Karabō Miyane no Wakeari!? Japan	YTV	Panelist
2012	Himitsu no Kenmin Show	YTV	
2012	Ataru	TBS	
2012	Uesugi Takashi no Zen Ei Open Golf Katte ni Jikkyō Chūkei	Niconico Live	
2012	Hiroshi Sekiguchi no Kaze ni Fuka Rete	BS-TBS	
2014	Gokigenyō	Fuji TV	Guest
2014	Masaka no Tame-nen Talk Variety! Bikkurakoita-bako	CTV	

=== Stage shows ===
Year	Title	Notes
2011	Smoke Company Vol.1: Natsu no Owarini	Daily guest

=== Ads ===
Year	Title	Notes
2013	Keiyo D2	

=== Other ===
Year	Title	Notes	Ref.
2014	Higashinihon Daishinsai Tsuitō Fukkō Kinen-shiki	Moderator	
2014	Fukushima Concert: Fukkō no Hibiki	Moderator	
	Morohashi Museum of Modern Art "Salvador Dali no Sekai-ten"	Voice guide	
