= Goshiki-numa =

- 五色沼 (Japanese)
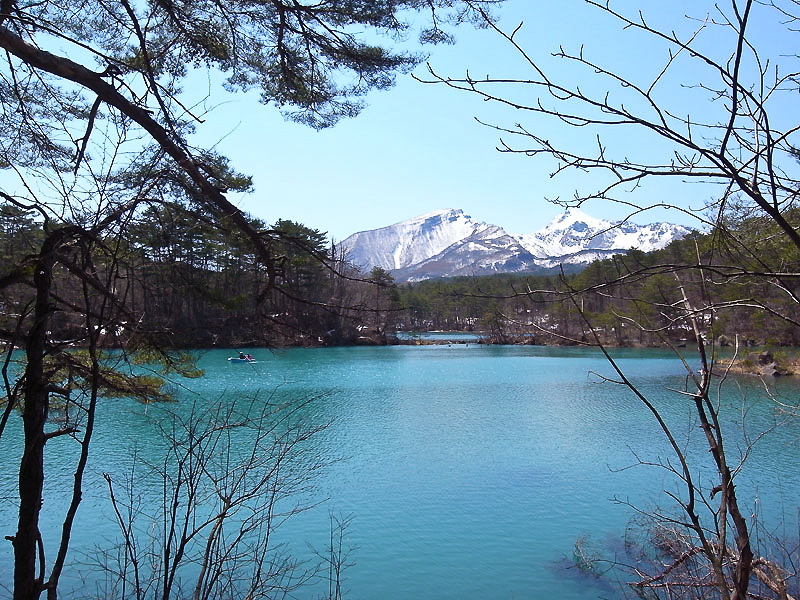

- Location within Japan
- Location: Kitashiobara, Fukushima
- Coordinates: 37.653179°N 140.08667°E
- Type: tectonic lake
- Basin countries: Japan
- Surface elevation: 300 m (980 ft)

Goshiki-numa (五色沼), is a cluster of five volcanic lakes situated at the foot of Mount Bandai in the center of the lake district of the Bandai Highland (磐梯高原, Bandai-kōgen), Kitashiobara, Fukushima, Japan.

Goshiki-numa formed when Mount Bandai erupted on July 15, 1888, destroying dozens of villages and killing approximately 500 people while creating hundreds of lakes and tarns.

The eruption completely rearranged the landscape, creating the Bandai-kōgen plateau and damming local rivers. The eruption imparted mineral deposits to the Five Colored Lakes giving each of them its own distinct color, ranging from reddish green to cobalt blue. The colors of each lake mysteriously fluctuate throughout the year with the weather. Since the eruption, Goshiki-numa has become a popular tourist destination. An approximately four-kilometer walking path from Lake Bishamon, the largest of the five lakes, to Lake Hibara affords people a view of all five lakes.

== Gallery ==
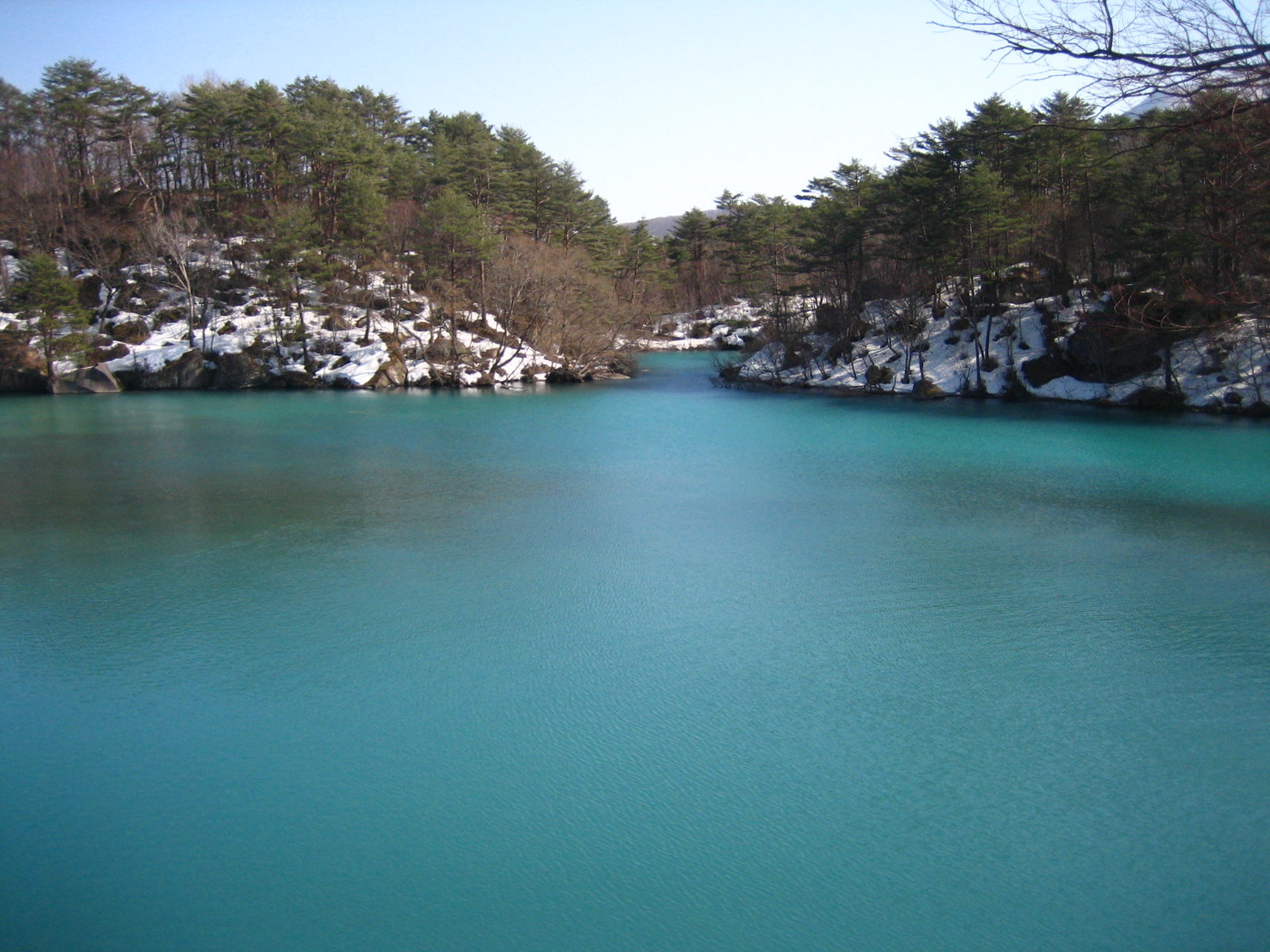
Bishamon-numa

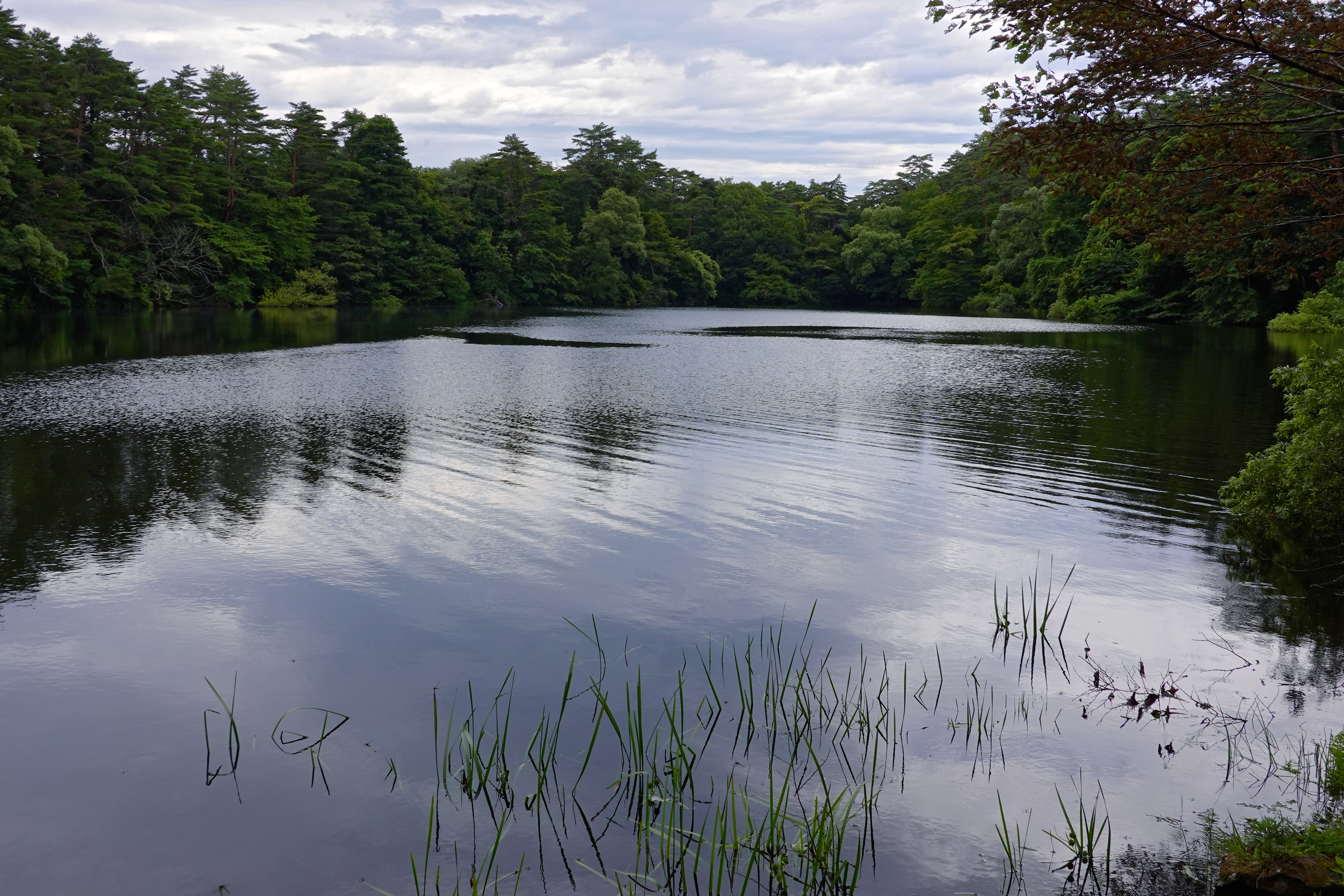
Yanagi-numa

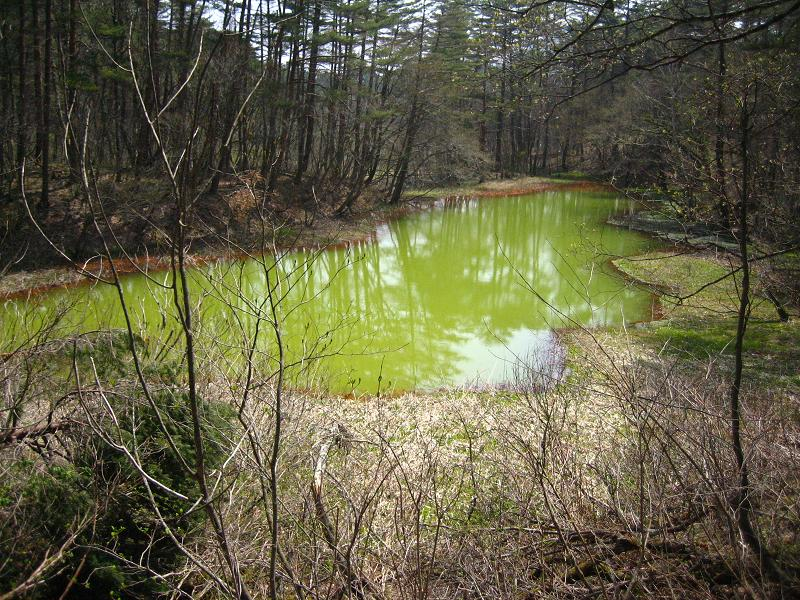
Aka-numa

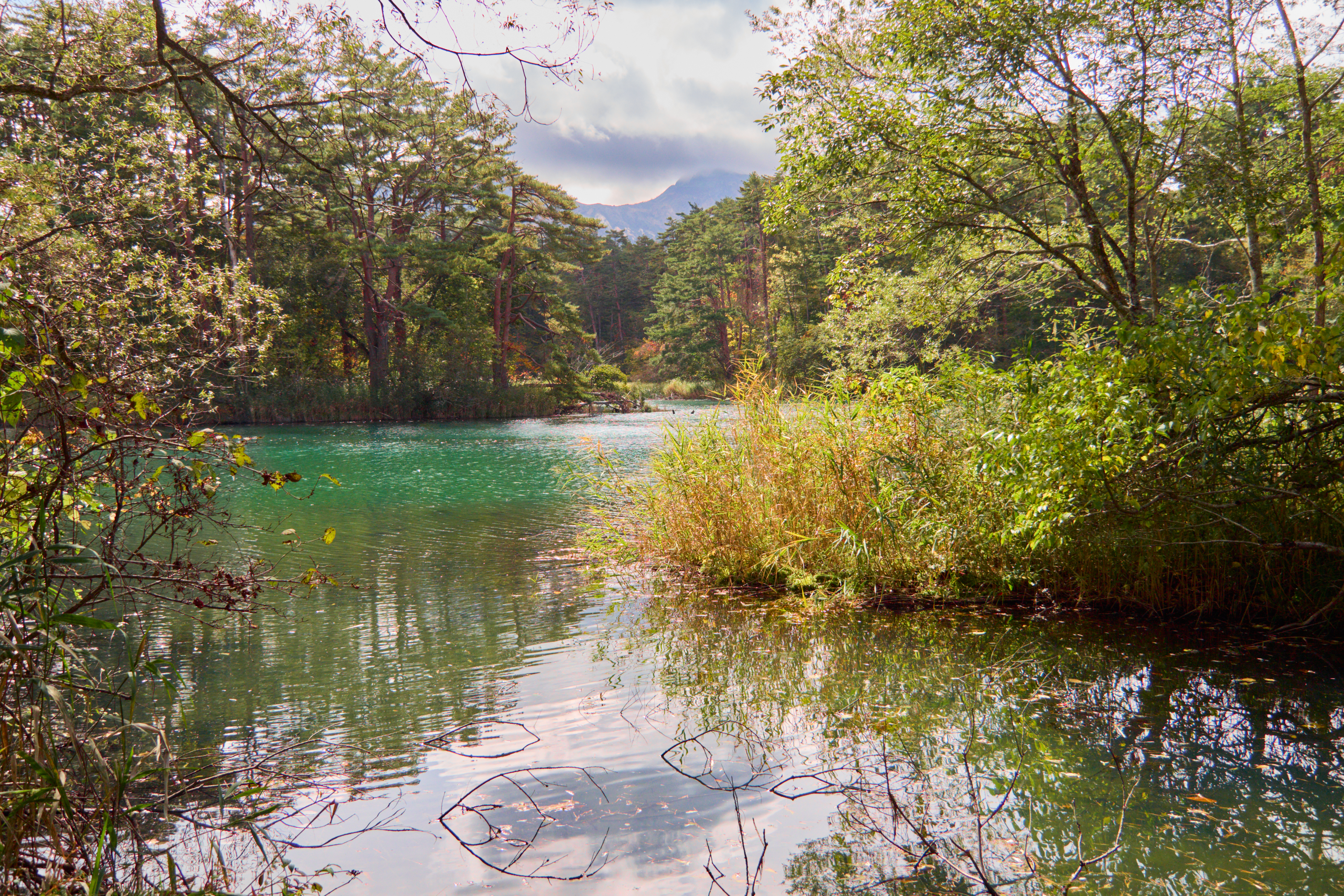
Goshikinuma

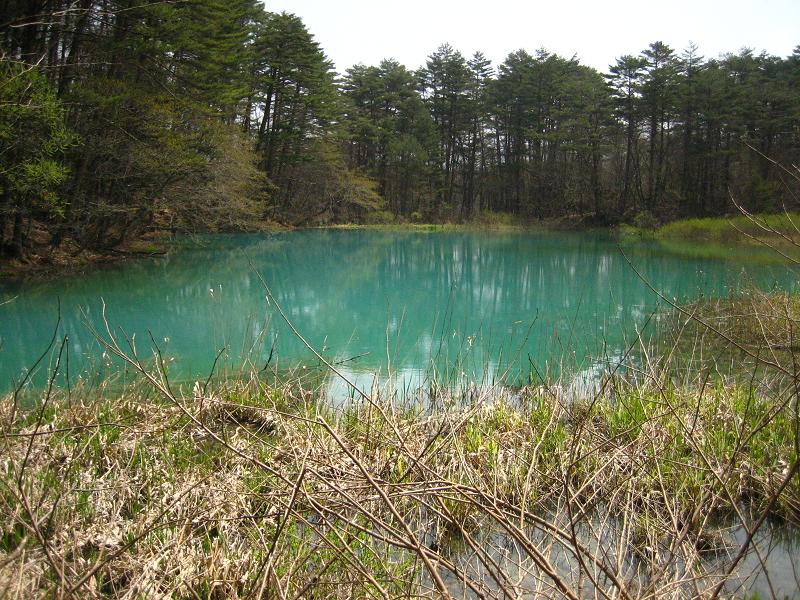
Ao-numa

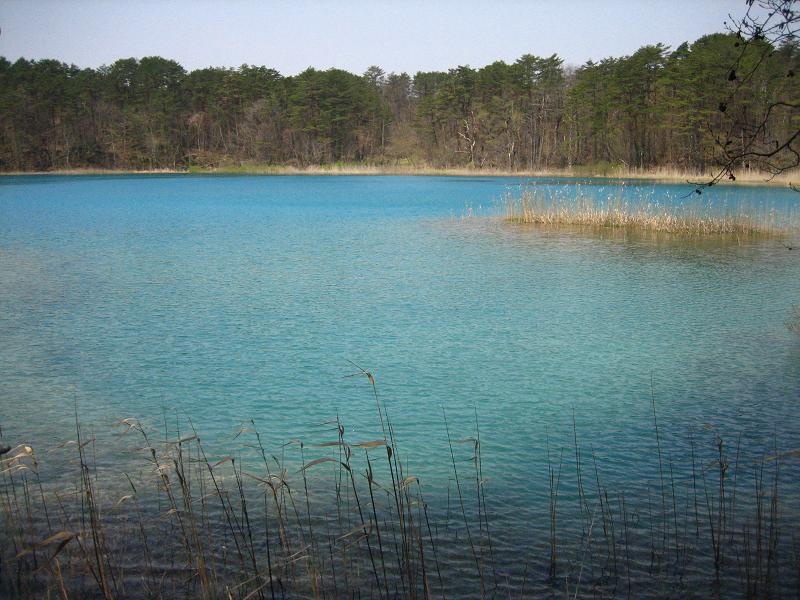
Benten-numa

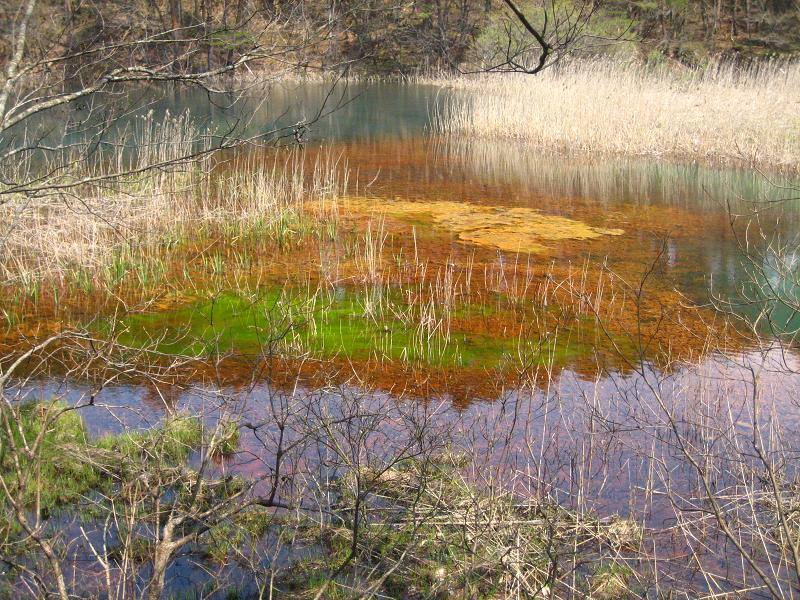
Midoro-numa

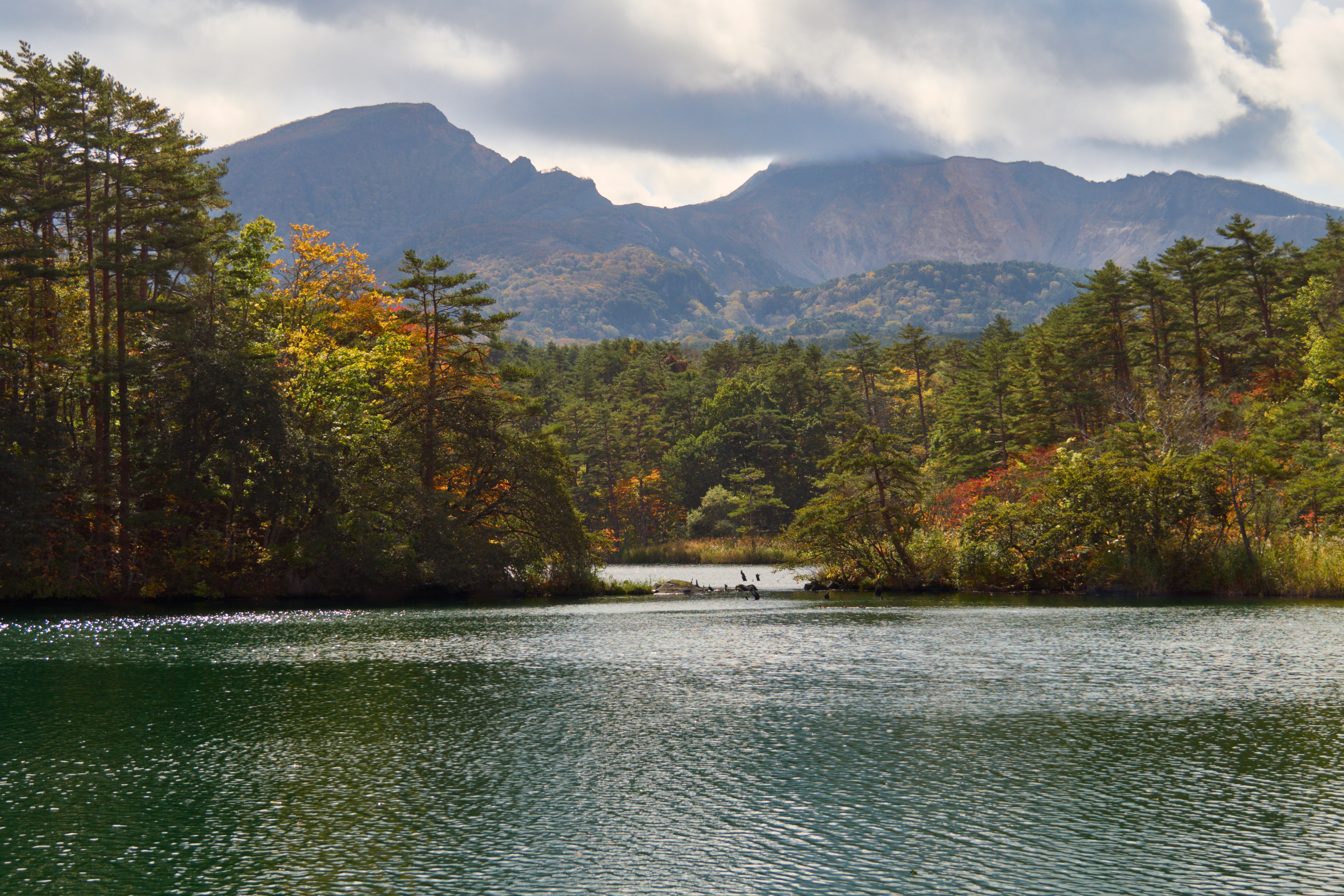
Goshikinuma lake in autumn, with forested hills and a mountain range in the background.

== See also ==
- Goshiki-numa in the Zaō Mountains, Miyagi, Japan
