= Kitashiobara, Fukushima =

Kitashiobara 北塩原村
- Village
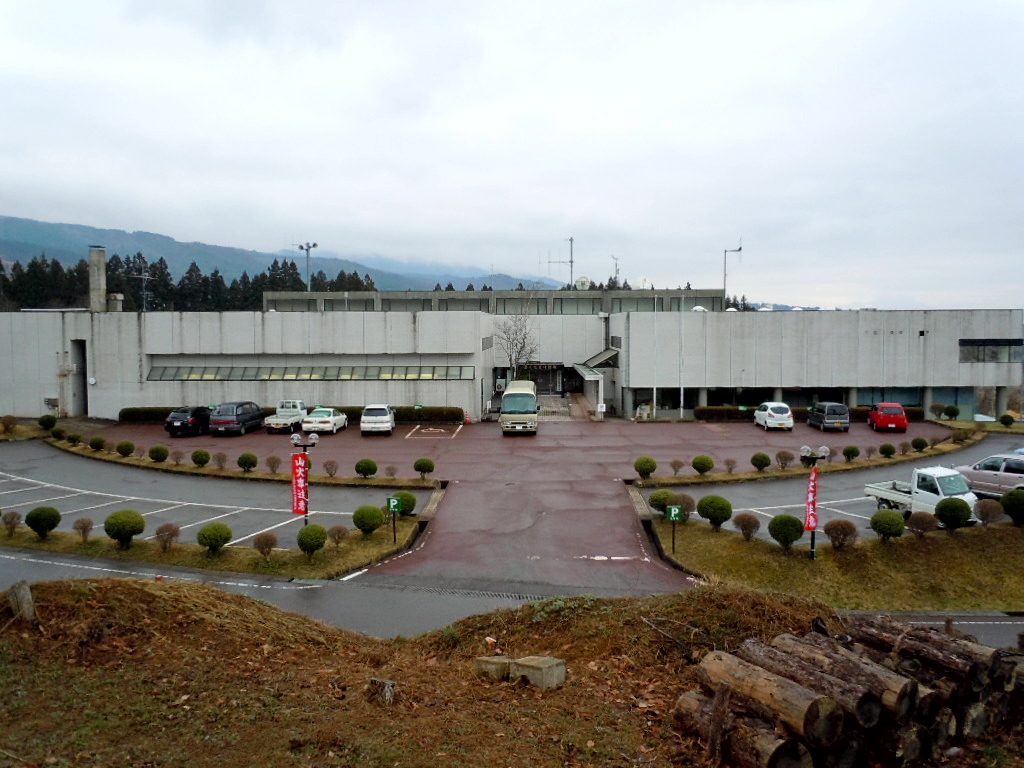
- Kitashiobara Village Hall

- Flag Seal

- Location of Kitashiobara in Fukushima Prefecture

- Coordinates: 37°39′20.4″N 139°56′15.4″E
- Country: Japan
- Region: Tōhoku
- Prefecture: Fukushima
- District: Yama

Area
  - Total: 234.08 km^{2} (90.38 sq mi)

Population (April 2020)
  - Total: 2,697
  - Density: 11.52/km^{2} (29.84/sq mi)
- Time zone: UTC+9 (Japan Standard Time)
- Tree: Prunus sargentii
- Flower: Lysichiton camtschatcensis
- Bird: Japanese tit
- Phone number: 0241-23-3111
- Address: 3151 Kitayama Kitashiobara-mura, Yama-gun, Fukushima-ken 966-0485
- Website: Official website

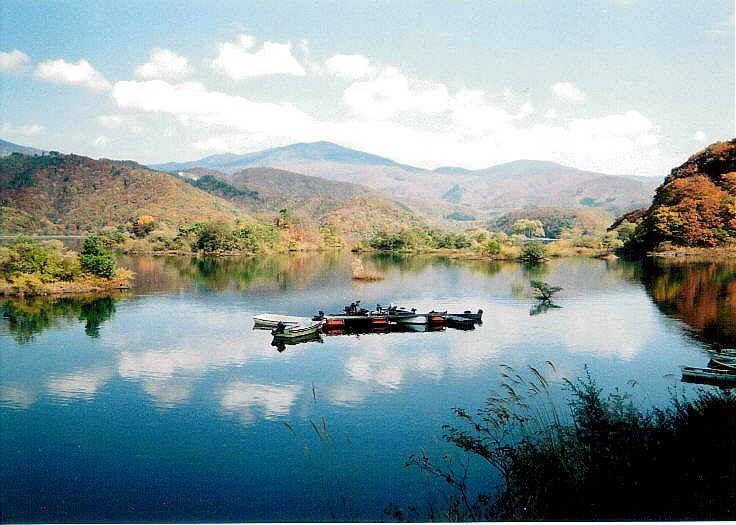
Lake Akimoto

Kitashiobara (北塩原村, Kitashiobara-mura) is a village located in Fukushima Prefecture, Japan. As of 1 April 2020, the village had an estimated population of 2,697 in 1091 households, and a population density of 12 persons per km^{2}. The total area of the village was 234.08 square kilometres (90.38 sq mi).

== Geography ==
Kitashiobara is located at the far northern Aizu region of Fukushima Prefecture, bordered by Yamagata Prefecture to the north. Kitashiobara consists of three areas, named after the former the villages of Kitayama, Ōshio, and Hibara. The western portion, Hibara, has a higher elevation than the other two areas, most of it between 800 m and 1000 m. Also, Lake Hibara in Hibara is located in the Bandai-Asahi National Park. It was created in 1888 during the eruption of Mount Bandai. Oguni-numa, a swamp, is reserved by the Japanese government as a natural monument. Some 86% of the village area is covered in mountains and forest.

- Mountains : Mount Bandai
- Rivers : Nakutsu-gawa, Ono-gawa
- Lakes : Lake Hibara, Goshiki-numa, Lake Onogawa, Oguni-numa, Akimoto Lake

=== Neighboring municipalities ===
Fukushima Prefecture

- Bandai
- Inawashiro
- Kitakata

Yamagata Prefecture

- Yonezawa

== Climate ==
Kitashiobara has a humid continental climate (Köppen Dfb) characterized by warm summers and cold winters with heavy snowfall. The average annual temperature in Kitashiobara is 7.4 °C. The average annual rainfall is 1666 mm with September as the wettest month. The temperatures are highest on average in August, at around 20.8 °C, and lowest in January, at around -4.9 °C.

Climate data for Hibara, Kitashiobara (1991–2020 normals, extremes 1978–present)
Month	Jan	Feb	Mar	Apr	May	Jun	Jul	Aug	Sep	Oct	Nov	Dec	Year
Record high °C (°F)	10.0 (50.0)	13.9 (57.0)	16.1 (61.0)	24.4 (75.9)	29.2 (84.6)	30.1 (86.2)	31.6 (88.9)	32.0 (89.6)	30.4 (86.7)	25.5 (77.9)	20.6 (69.1)	16.6 (61.9)	32.0 (89.6)
Mean daily maximum °C (°F)	−0.6 (30.9)	0.2 (32.4)	3.9 (39.0)	10.8 (51.4)	17.4 (63.3)	20.7 (69.3)	24.1 (75.4)	25.5 (77.9)	21.3 (70.3)	15.2 (59.4)	8.9 (48.0)	2.4 (36.3)	12.5 (54.5)
Daily mean °C (°F)	−4.2 (24.4)	−4.0 (24.8)	−0.7 (30.7)	5.0 (41.0)	11.5 (52.7)	15.7 (60.3)	19.7 (67.5)	20.6 (69.1)	16.4 (61.5)	10.1 (50.2)	4.2 (39.6)	−1.2 (29.8)	7.8 (46.0)
Mean daily minimum °C (°F)	−8.8 (16.2)	−9.4 (15.1)	−5.7 (21.7)	−0.4 (31.3)	5.4 (41.7)	10.8 (51.4)	15.7 (60.3)	16.4 (61.5)	12.0 (53.6)	5.3 (41.5)	−0.3 (31.5)	−5.1 (22.8)	3.0 (37.4)
Record low °C (°F)	−21.7 (−7.1)	−22.9 (−9.2)	−18.1 (−0.6)	−10.9 (12.4)	−2.9 (26.8)	0.5 (32.9)	4.8 (40.6)	5.6 (42.1)	0.5 (32.9)	−5.5 (22.1)	−11.9 (10.6)	−16.7 (1.9)	−22.9 (−9.2)
Average precipitation mm (inches)	145.1 (5.71)	110.3 (4.34)	119.1 (4.69)	113.1 (4.45)	117.9 (4.64)	151.4 (5.96)	259.2 (10.20)	214.7 (8.45)	160.1 (6.30)	136.2 (5.36)	130.7 (5.15)	165.2 (6.50)	1,822.8 (71.76)
Average precipitation days (≥ 1.0 mm)	19.9	17.3	16.9	13.8	12.3	12.3	16.3	12.9	13.4	12.7	15.6	20.3	183.8
Mean monthly sunshine hours	42.9	53.3	92.7	143.1	166.6	134.1	112.6	151.5	115.8	108.1	82.3	53.1	1,256.1
Source: Japan Meteorological Agency (1991–2020 normals, extremes 1978–present)

== Demographics ==
Per Japanese census data, the population of Kitashiobara has declined steadily over the past 40 years.

Historical population
Year	Pop.	±%
1920	4,482	—
1930	4,368	−2.5%
1940	4,375	+0.2%
1950	5,284	+20.8%
1960	5,351	+1.3%
1970	4,287	−19.9%
1980	3,869	−9.8%
1990	3,812	−1.5%
2000	3,644	−4.4%
2010	3,185	−12.6%
2020	2,556	−19.7%

== History ==
The area of present-day Kitashiobara was part of ancient Mutsu Province, and formed part of the holdings of Aizu Domain during the Edo period. After the Meiji Restoration, it was organized as part of Yama District, Fukushima Prefecture. The villages of Kitayama, Ōshio and Hibara. were created with the establishment of the modern municipalities system on April 1, 1884. The three villages merged to form the village of Kitashiobara village was created on March 31, 1954.

== Economy ==
The economy of Kitashiobara is dependent on agriculture, seasonal tourism, and the mining of salt.

== Education ==
Kitashiobara has two public elementary schools and two public junior high schools operated by the village government. The village does not have a public high school.

== Transportation ==
=== Railway ===
- Kitashiobara does not have any passenger rail service.

=== Highway ===
- National Route 459

== Local attractions ==
- Bandai-Asahi National Park
- Goshiki-numa
- Morohashi Museum of Modern Art
