= Lake Hibara =

Lake in Japan

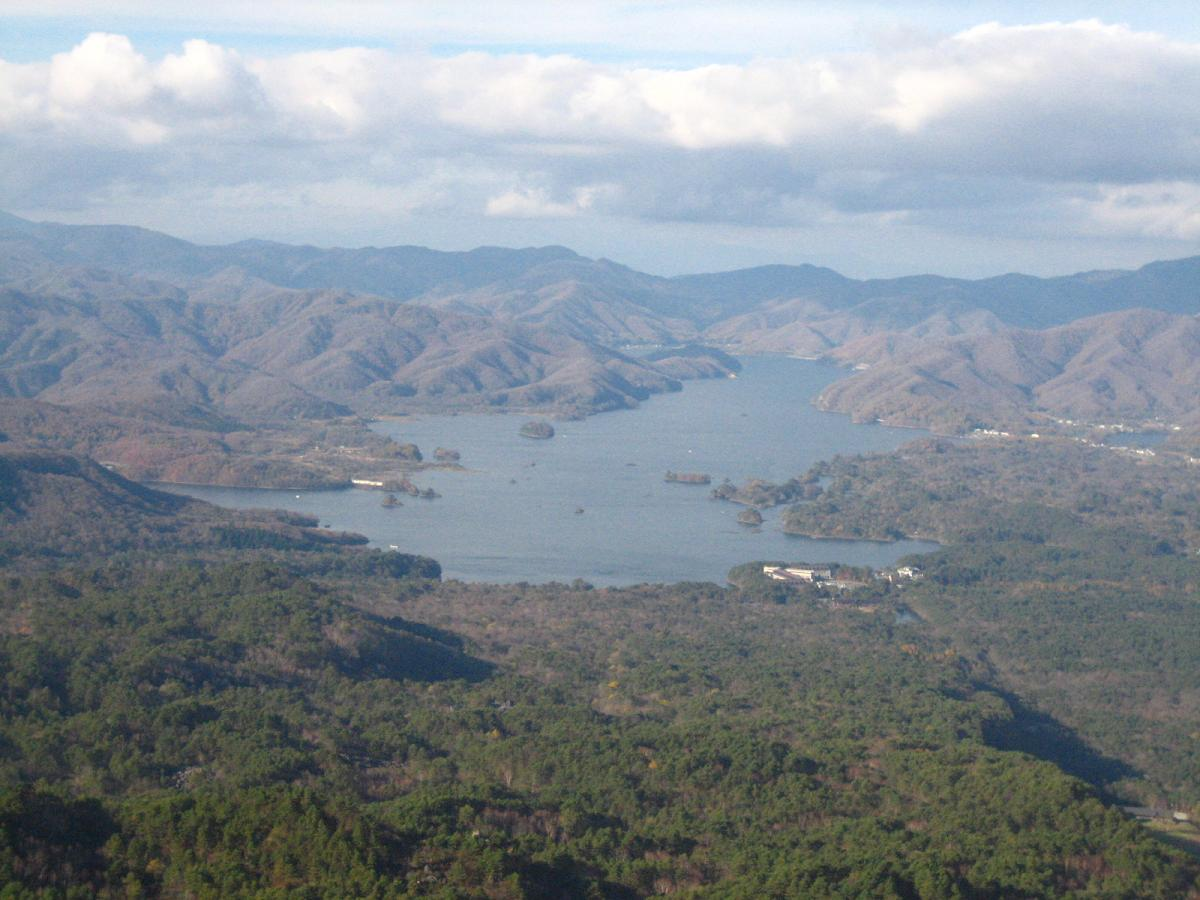
- Lake Hibara viewed from north of Mount Bandai

- Location within Japan
- Location: Kitashiobara
- Coordinates: 37°41′0″N 140°3′20″E
- Basin countries: Japan
- Surface area: 10.7 km^{2} (4.1 sq mi)
- Max. depth: 30.5 m (100 ft)
- Water volume: 0.13 km^{3} (110,000 acre⋅ft)
- Shore length^{1}: 31.5 km (19.6 mi)
- Surface elevation: 822.0 m (2,696.9 ft)
- ^{1} Shore length is not a well-defined measure.

Lake Hibara (桧原湖, Hibara-ko) is a lake located in Yama District, Fukushima, Japan. It is a part of the Bandai-Asahi National Park and is the largest of the lakes in the Bandai Highland.

== Formation ==
A mesotrophic lake, Lake Hibara was formed as a result of the July 15, 1888 eruption of Mount Bandai. The resulting debris avalanche created a natural dam that then filled with water, submerging Hibara Village (桧原村, Hibara-mura). The remains of Hibara Village still lie at the bottom of the lake.

== Recreation ==
A tourist industry has built up around Lake Hibara, offering hiking trails, pleasure cruises, and campgrounds and other lodging. In the winter, ice fishing is popular.

== Climate ==
Climate data for Lake Hibara (1991−2020 normals, extremes 1978−present)
Month	Jan	Feb	Mar	Apr	May	Jun	Jul	Aug	Sep	Oct	Nov	Dec	Year
Record high °C (°F)	10.0 (50.0)	13.9 (57.0)	16.1 (61.0)	24.4 (75.9)	29.2 (84.6)	30.1 (86.2)	31.5 (88.7)	32.0 (89.6)	30.2 (86.4)	25.5 (77.9)	19.9 (67.8)	16.6 (61.9)	32.0 (89.6)
Mean daily maximum °C (°F)	−0.6 (30.9)	0.2 (32.4)	3.9 (39.0)	10.8 (51.4)	17.4 (63.3)	20.7 (69.3)	24.1 (75.4)	25.5 (77.9)	21.3 (70.3)	15.2 (59.4)	8.9 (48.0)	2.4 (36.3)	12.5 (54.5)
Daily mean °C (°F)	−4.2 (24.4)	−4.0 (24.8)	−0.7 (30.7)	5.0 (41.0)	11.5 (52.7)	15.7 (60.3)	19.7 (67.5)	20.6 (69.1)	16.4 (61.5)	10.1 (50.2)	4.2 (39.6)	−1.2 (29.8)	7.8 (46.0)
Mean daily minimum °C (°F)	−8.8 (16.2)	−9.4 (15.1)	−5.7 (21.7)	−0.4 (31.3)	5.4 (41.7)	10.8 (51.4)	15.7 (60.3)	16.4 (61.5)	12.0 (53.6)	5.3 (41.5)	−0.3 (31.5)	−5.1 (22.8)	3.0 (37.4)
Record low °C (°F)	−21.7 (−7.1)	−22.9 (−9.2)	−18.1 (−0.6)	−10.9 (12.4)	−2.9 (26.8)	0.5 (32.9)	4.8 (40.6)	5.6 (42.1)	0.5 (32.9)	−5.5 (22.1)	−11.9 (10.6)	−16.7 (1.9)	−22.9 (−9.2)
Average precipitation mm (inches)	145.1 (5.71)	110.3 (4.34)	119.1 (4.69)	113.1 (4.45)	117.9 (4.64)	151.4 (5.96)	259.2 (10.20)	214.7 (8.45)	160.1 (6.30)	136.2 (5.36)	130.7 (5.15)	165.2 (6.50)	1,822.8 (71.76)
Average rainy days (≥ 1.0 mm)	19.9	17.3	16.9	13.8	12.3	12.3	16.3	12.9	13.4	12.7	15.6	20.3	183.7
Mean monthly sunshine hours	42.9	53.3	92.7	143.1	166.6	134.1	112.6	151.5	115.8	108.1	82.3	53.1	1,256.1
Source: Japan Meteorological Agency

== Gallery ==
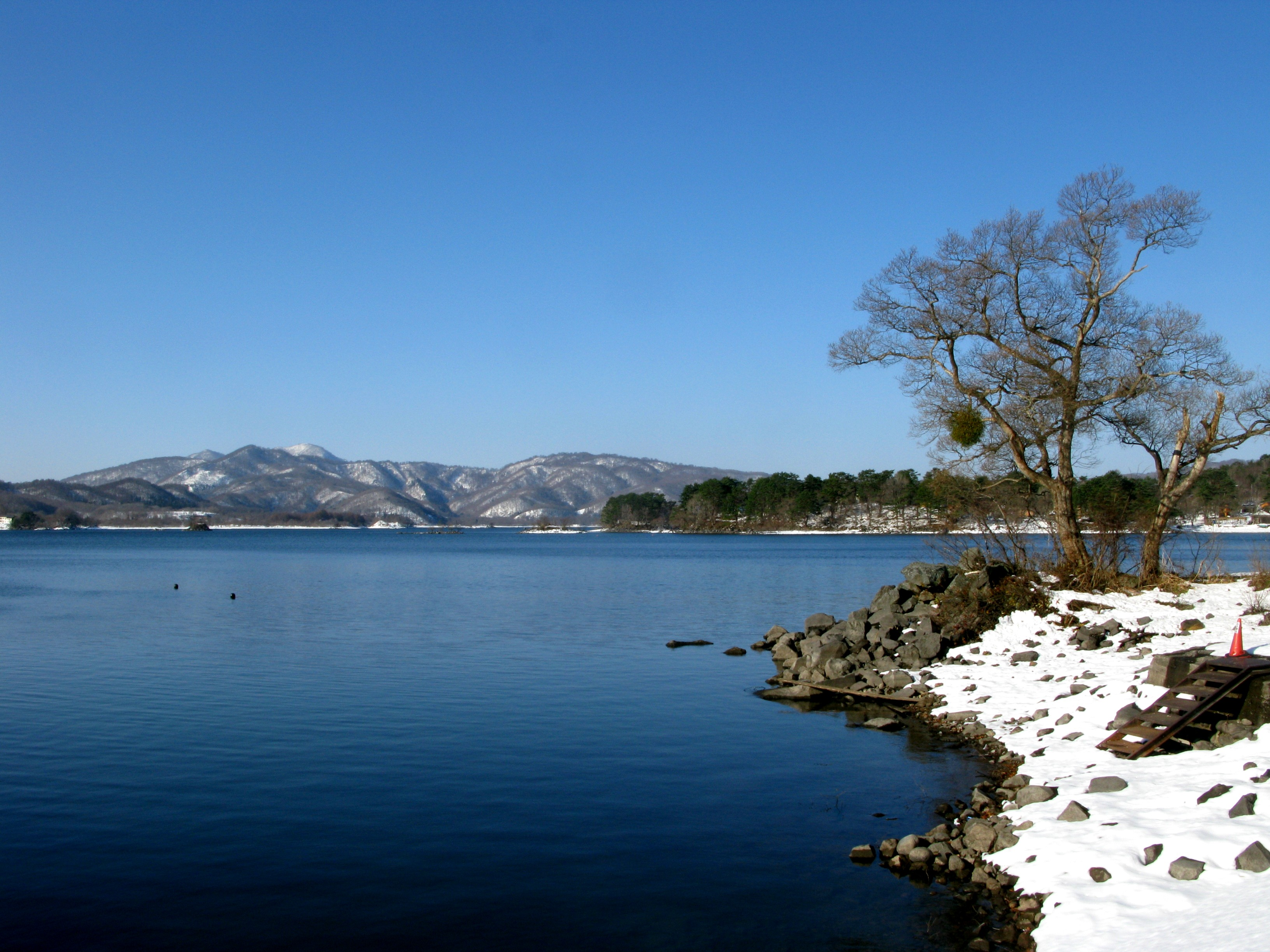
Lake Hibara with snow

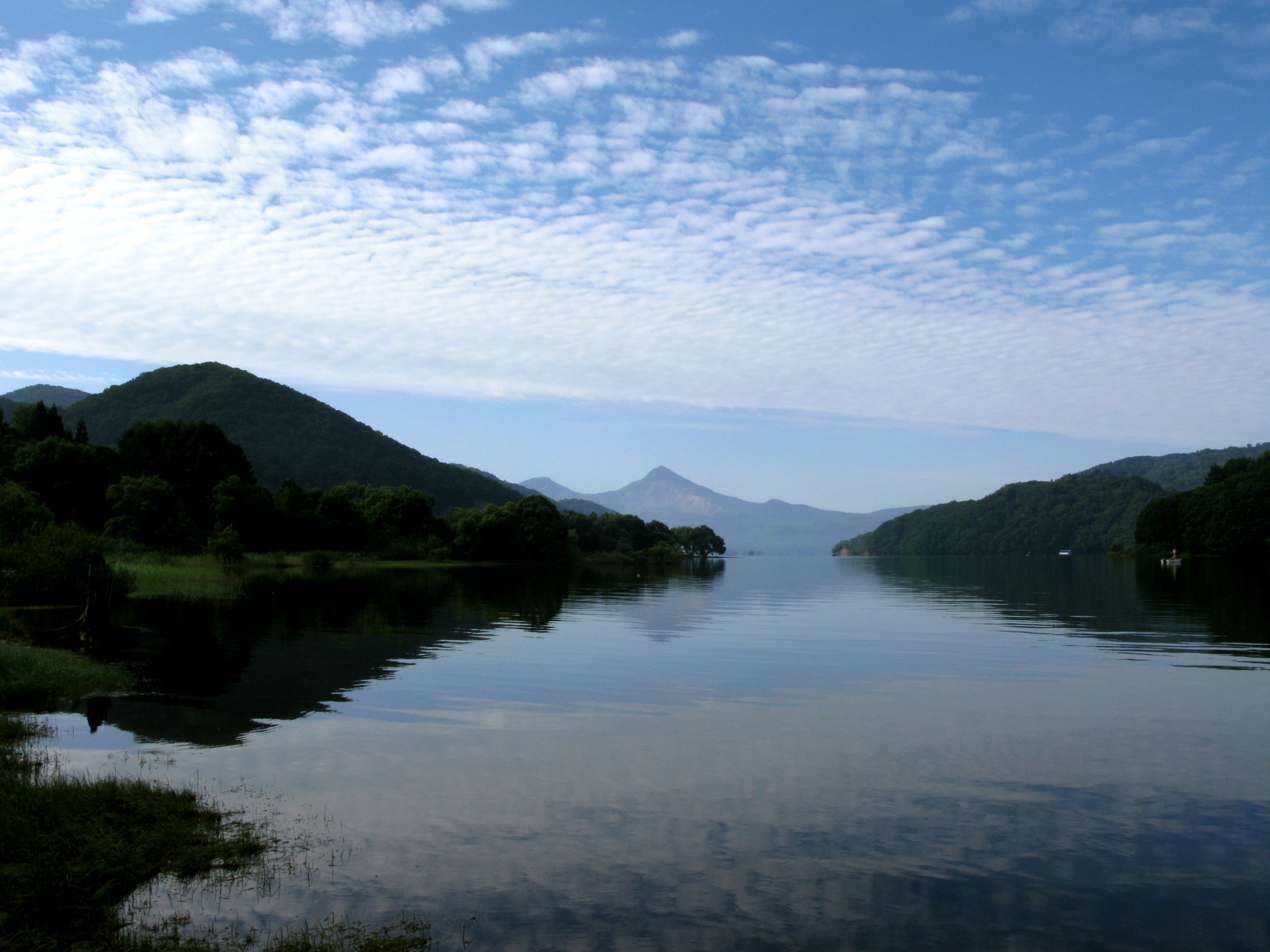
Looking south

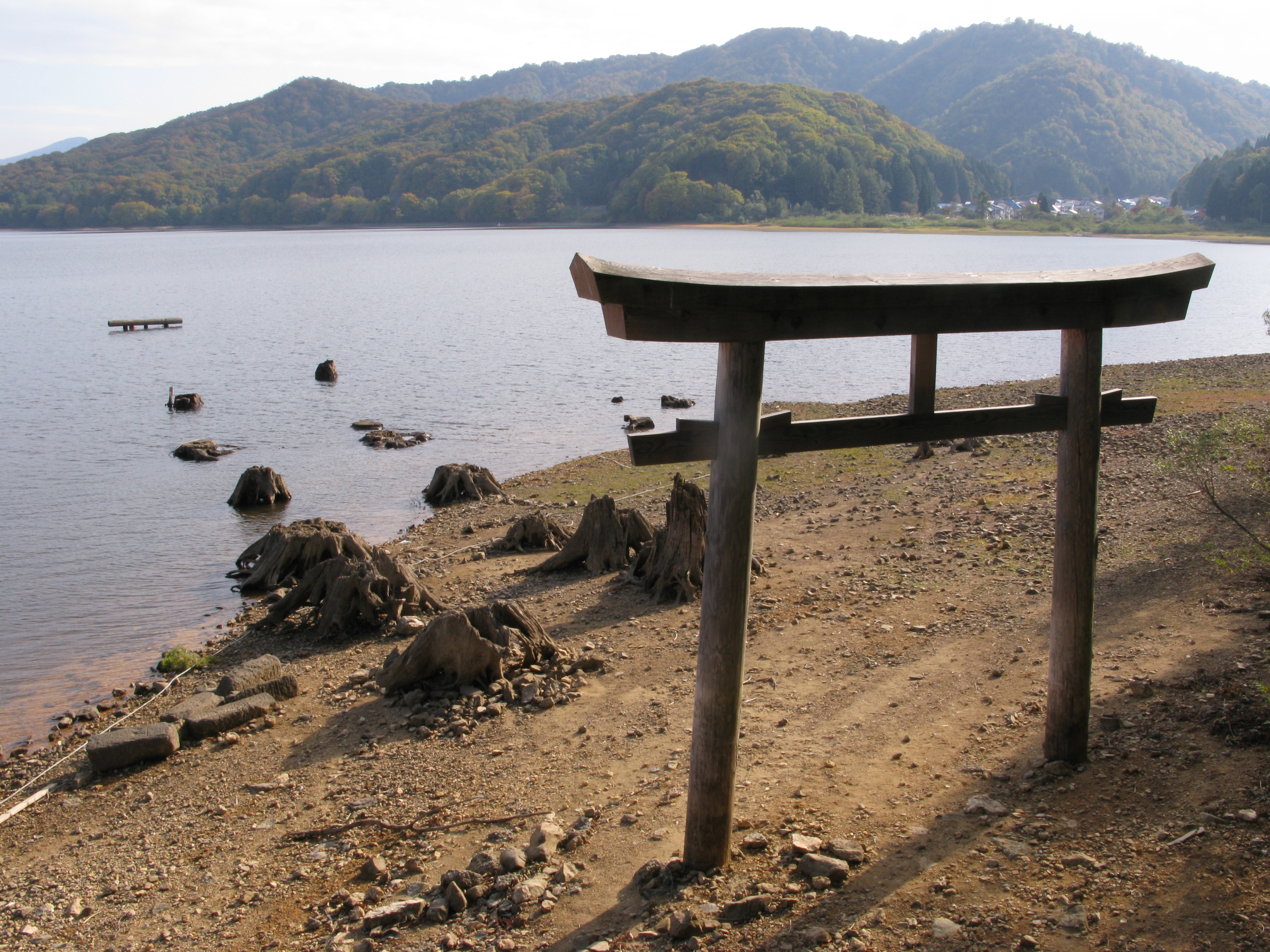
Submerged torii from the former location of Hibara Village.
