= Oguni-numa Pond =

Coordinates: 37°37′10″N 140°00′10″E

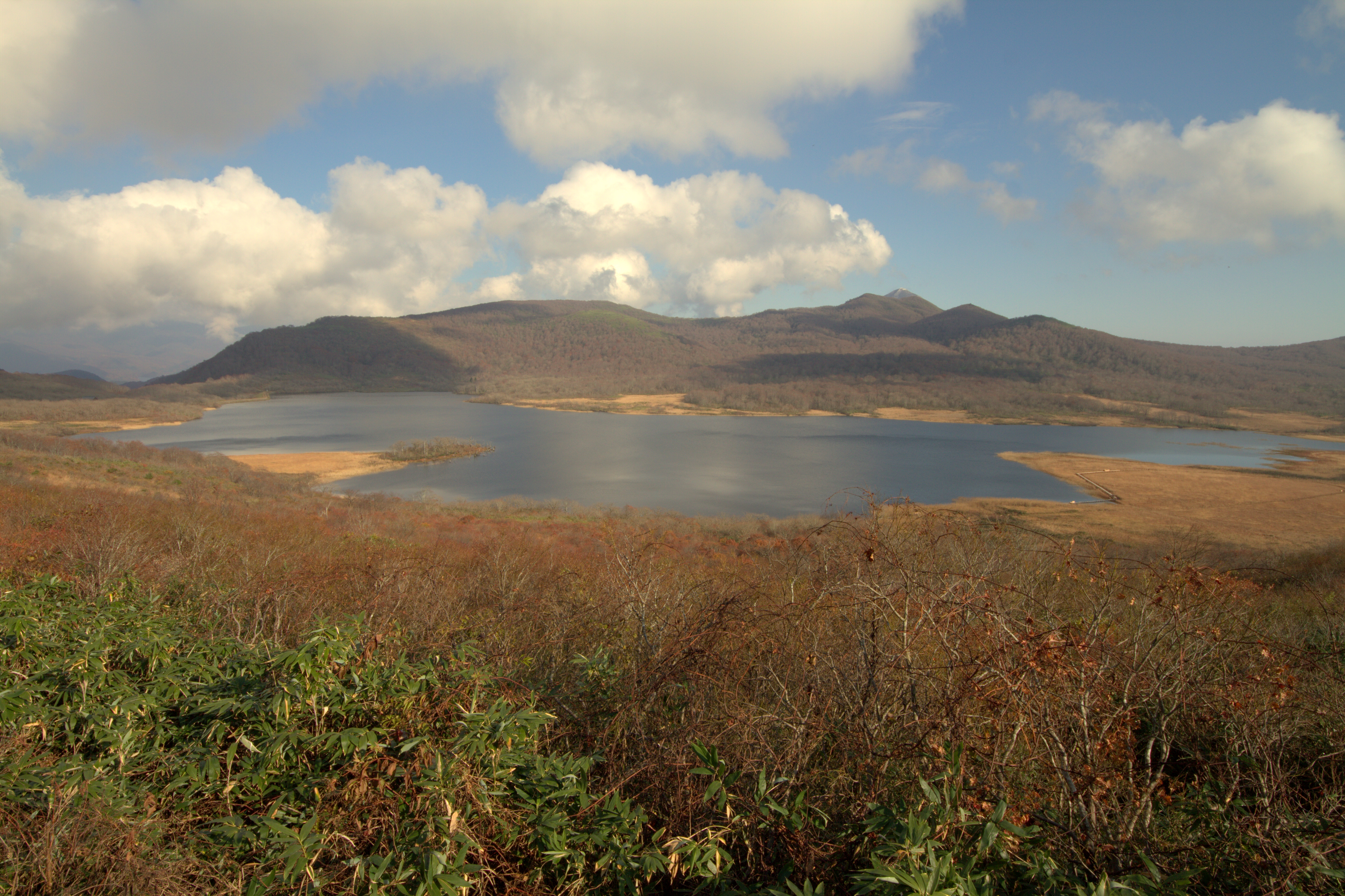
Oguni pond

Oguni-numa Pond (Japanese Kanji: 雄国沼; Japanese Hiragana: おぐにぬま) is a pond located at the western base of Mount Nekomadake in Fukushima Prefecture, Japan. The pond is situated on the remains of a crater and has a circumference of 4 km and an area of 45 hectares. The wetland flora of the pond is a nationally designated natural monument.
