= Lake Inawashiro =

Lake in Fukushima, Japan

Lake Inawashiro 猪苗代湖
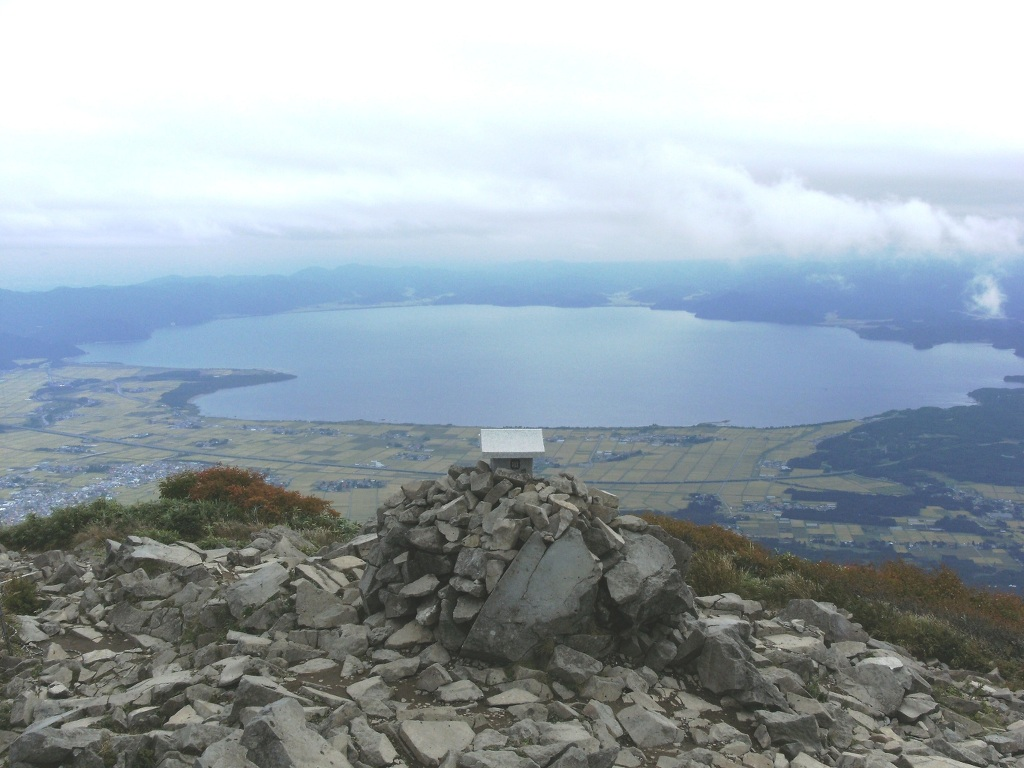
- A view from the top of Mt.Bandai

- Location within Japan
- Location: Fukushima Prefecture
- Coordinates: 37°28′29″N 140°05′37″E
- Type: tectonic lake
- Primary outflows: Nippashi River
- Basin countries: Japan
- Surface area: 103.3 km^{2} (39.9 sq mi)
- Average depth: 51.5 m (169 ft)
- Max. depth: 94.6 m (310 ft)
- Water volume: 5.40 km^{3} (4,380,000 acre⋅ft)
- Shore length^{1}: 49 km (30 mi)
- Surface elevation: 514 m (1,686 ft)
- Islands: Okinajima
- ^{1} Shore length is not a well-defined measure.

Lake Inawashiro (猪苗代湖, Inawashiro-ko) is the fourth-largest lake in Japan, located in central Fukushima Prefecture, south of Mount Bandai. It is also known as the 'Heavenly Mirror Lake' (天鏡湖, Tenkyōko). The lake is located within the borders of Bandai-Asahi National Park. It is a surface area of 104 square kilometres (40 sq mi), circumference of 63 kilometres (39 mi), depth of 94 metres (308 ft) and is located at an altitude of 514 metres (1,686 ft). In winter swans migrate to the beaches of the lake and stay there until spring.

== History ==
Lake Inawashiro was formed some 30–40,000 years ago when a tectonic depression was dammed by a major eruption and pyroclastic flow from Mount Bandai. The water is acidic with a pH value of approximately 5.0, and has a high degree of transparency. The water level was considerably less during the Jōmon period as numerous artifacts and ceramic fragments have been found offshore.

The lake water is an important source for irrigation in the Aizu region of western Fukushima Prefecture. An irrigation canal was completed during the Edo period and another, the Asaka Canal, in 1882. A third canal completed in 1915 supplies the city of Kōriyama with drinking and industrial water. The water also supplies a number of hydroelectric power plants. The lake is also an important tourist and leisure attraction in Fukushima Prefecture.

== See also ==
- Hideyo Noguchi
- Mount Bandai
