= Mount Bandai =

Stratovolcano in Japan

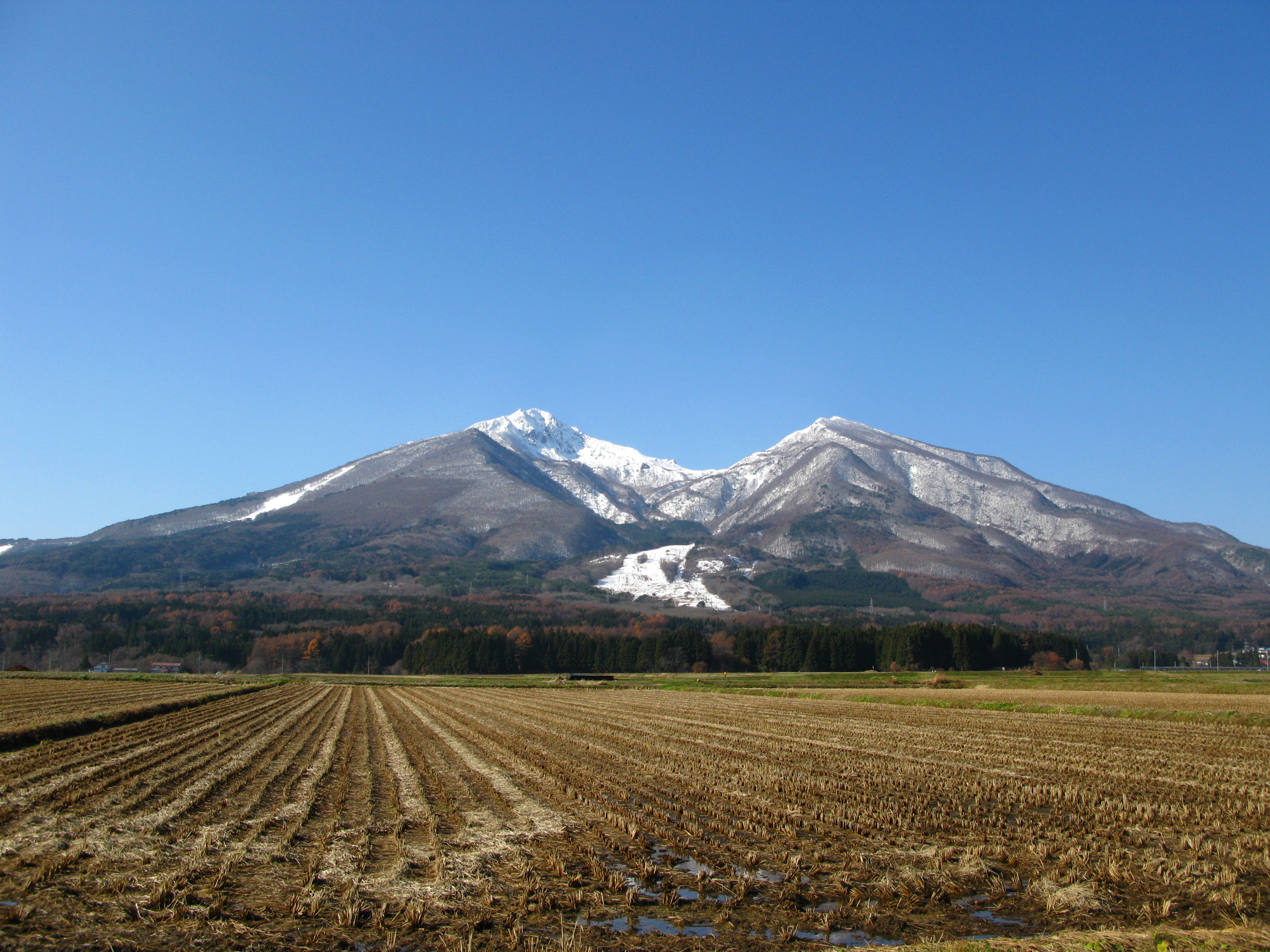
- Mount Bandai rises above rice fields.

Highest point
- Elevation: 1,819 m (5,968 ft)
- Listing: 100 famous mountains in Japan
- Coordinates: 37°35′53″N 140°04′32″E

Naming
- Native name: 磐梯山 (Japanese)
- English translation: A rock ladder to the sky

Geography
- Location within Fukushima Prefecture
- Location: Fukushima Prefecture, Tōhoku region, Honshū, Japan

Geology
- Mountain type: Stratovolcano
- Volcanic arc: Northeastern Japan Arc
- Last eruption: July 1888

Climbing
- Easiest route: Hiking

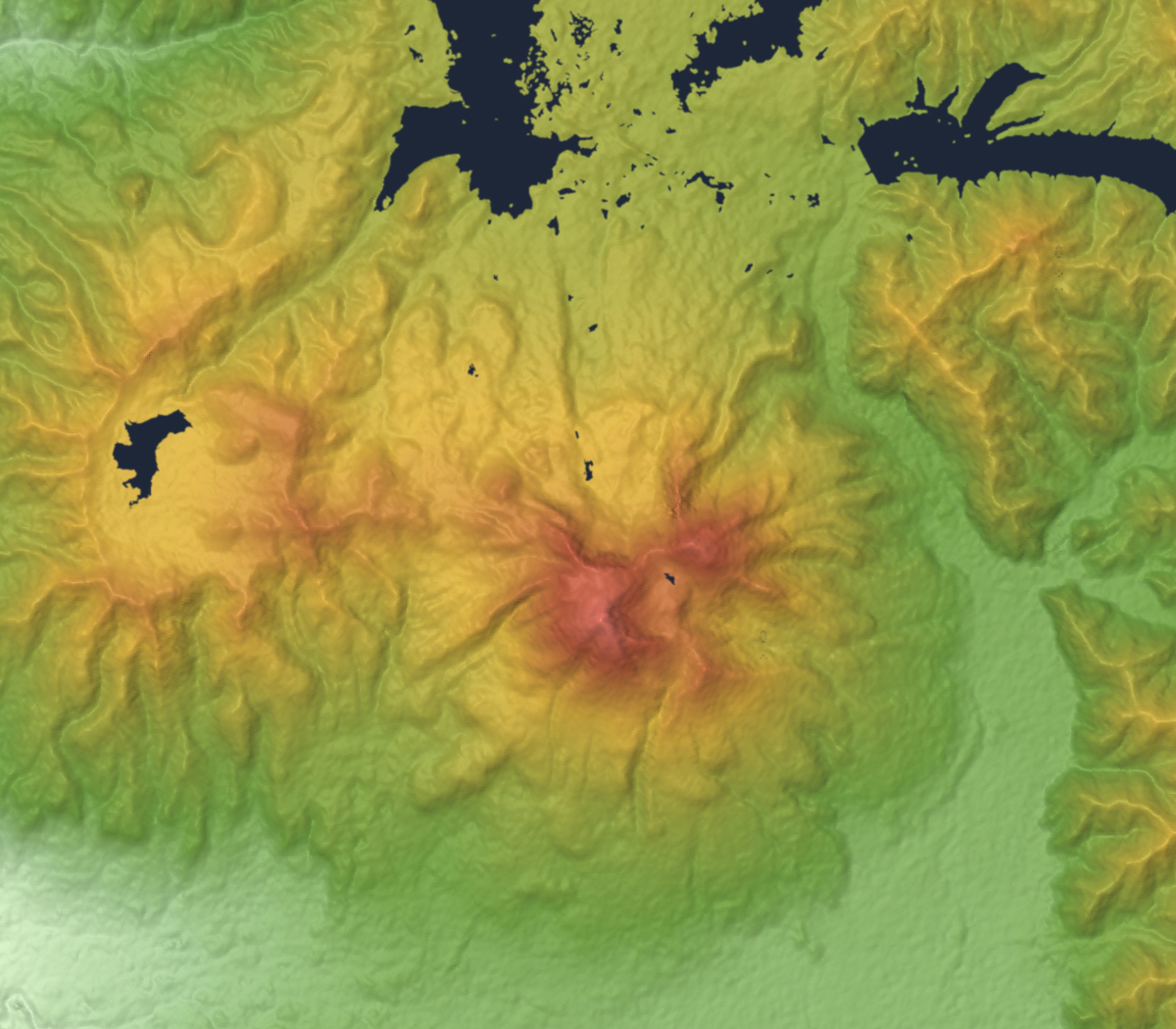
Bandai volcano (right), Nekoma volcano (left)

Mount Bandai (磐梯山, Bandai-san) is a stratovolcano located in Inawashiro-town, Bandai-town, and Kitashiobara village, in Yama-Gun, Fukushima prefecture. It is an active stratovolcano located to the north of Lake Inawashiro. Mount Bandai, including the Bandai heights, belongs to the Bandai-Asahi National Park.

The altitude of the triangulation station "Bandai", installed in 1904, had been employed as the official altitude of Mount Bandai. However, after the station disappeared due to erosion, it was re-measured in October 2010 and now is 1,816.29 m (5,959.0 ft). The name "Mount Bandai" is used to refer to the main peak "Bandai", along with several other peaks including Akahani at 1,430 m (4,690 ft) and Kushigamine at 1,636 m (5,367 ft), created during the 1888 eruption of Mount Bandai.

Mount Bandai was originally called "Iwahashi-yama" which means "a rock ladder to the sky". It is now sometimes called "Aizu Fuji" and "Aizu Bandai". The south foot is called Omotebandai and the north foot is called Urabandai. When seen from Omotebandai, the mountain looks tidy and mostly conical in shape, but when viewed from Urabandai the mountain shows a wild shape with jagged cliffs and exposed bedrock, due to its collapse.

It is one of the 100 famous mountains of Japan. In 2007, the mountain was selected as one of the top 100 geographic landmarks in Japan. Additionally, in 2011 the mountain was certified as a geopark of Japan.

== Volcanic activity ==
Typical features of mount Bandai's activity are debris avalanches and sector collapses. Mount Bandai has not experienced a lava flow since the eruption of about 10,000 years ago. It is thought that volcanic activity began about 290,000 years ago when there were two scoria eruptions, after the activity of Mount Nekoma (from approximately 1.1 million years ago to 350 thousand years ago) somewhere to the west. Based on sediment surveys, geologists divide the history of the volcano into six sections.

1. It is not clear when the volcanic activities of Mount Bandai started, but it is believed that before about 290,000 years ago it was inactive and only became active after the activities of Nekoma volcano, which lies to the west, from 1.1 million years ago to 350,000 years ago.
2. Approximately 290,000 years ago, there were two scoria eruptions.
3. From about 210,000 years to 200,000 years ago there were several scoria and pumice eruptions.
4. Approximately 165,000 to 145,000 years ago, there were eruptions of volcanic ash and pumice.
5. From about 80,000 years ago to 65,000 years ago, there were sub-plinian and Vulcanian eruptions of pumice, which broke up the shape of the mountain.
6. Approximately 40,000 to 50,000 years ago, there was continuous activity with pumice eruptions, and sector collapse.

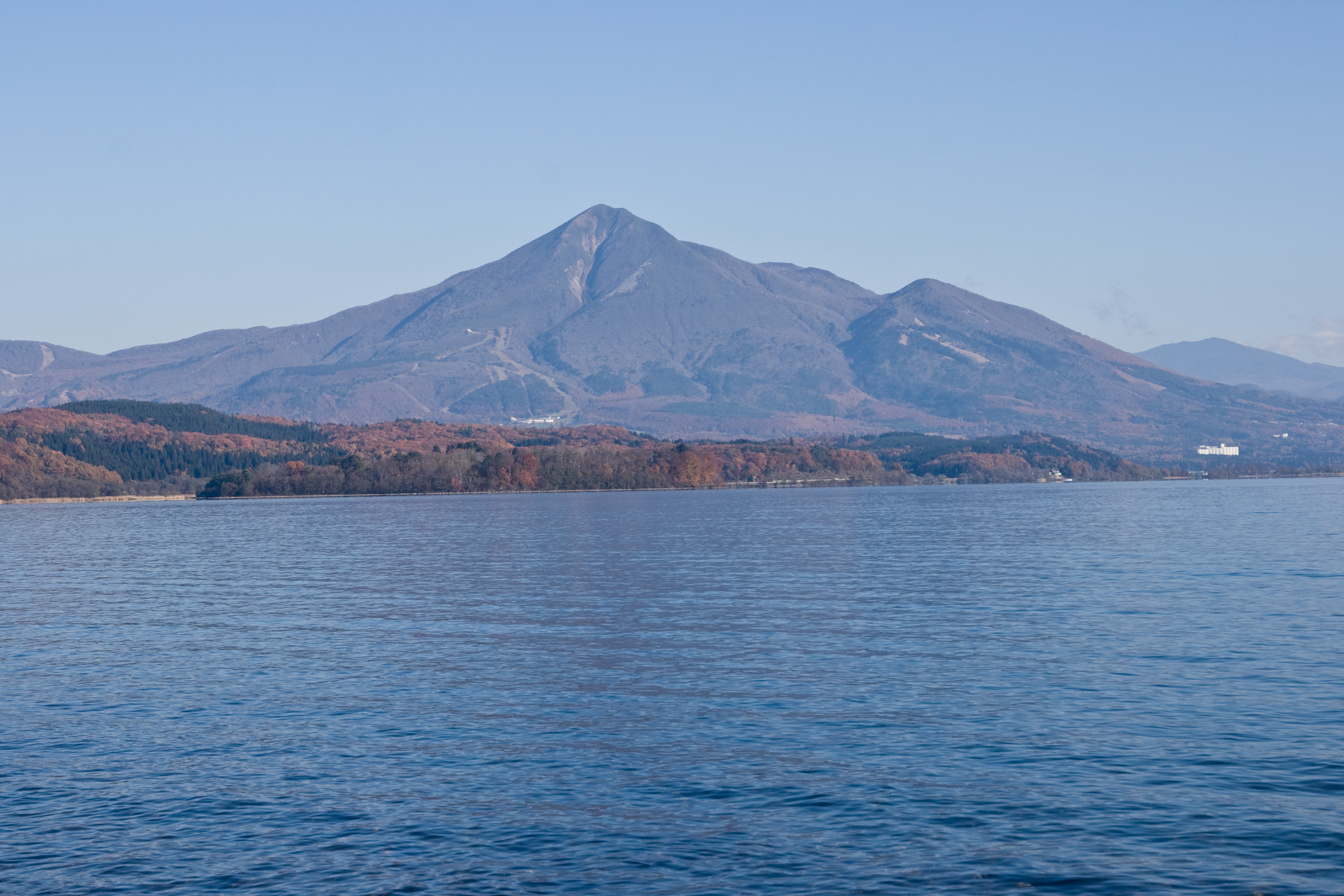
Mount Bandai

Approximately 90,000 years ago at the time of the Okinajima pyroclastic flow, and 50,000 years ago at the time of the Zunashi pyroclastic flow, the river formerly flowing through the Inawashiro basin was dammed, the water level rose, and Lake Inawashiro appeared.

Although it is said that the eruption which created four peaks in 1888 (Mount Obandai, Mount Kobandai, Mount Akabane, and Mount Amidagamine) was from a Mount Fuji shaped mountain of over 2000 meters formed in an eruption in 806 (the first year of Daido), there is also historic evidence which shows that there were eruptions at earlier times, which also changed the Fuji-shaped mountain.

=== Eruption of 1888 ===
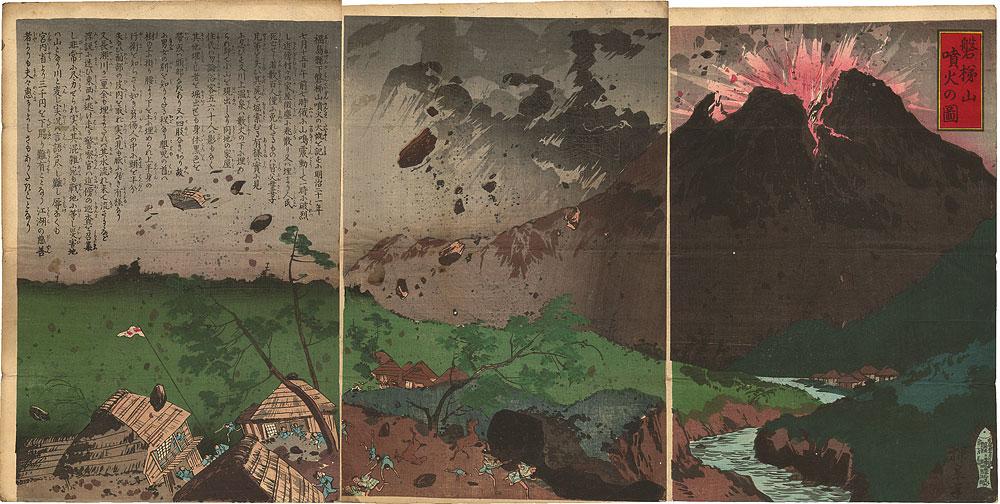
Ukiyo-e print by Tankei depicting the Eruption of Mount Bandai, 1888

In early July 1888, there was rumbling but this was not recognized as a warning for the eruption. On July 15, 1888, there was a phreatic eruption. After the explosive eruption, the north side of Kobandai collapsed and sector collapses began. The river Nagasegawa and its tributaries were blocked and lahars (volcanic mudslides) and debris flows damaged the downstream section of the river. Lakes Hibara, Onogawako, Akimotoko and Goshikinuma were formed. It is believed that hot ground water continuously spurting out had eroded the mountain and this caused it to collapse. The avalanche of debris buried five nearby villages on the north foot of the mountain and 477 people were killed.

This eruption was the first major disaster for the modern Japanese government which began from the Meiji period. The government launched an enquiry to investigate the eruption, and provided relief and attempted to rebuild the affected villages. Extensive research, including surveys was undertaken into the causes of the eruption and the extent of the damage – this was an unusual measure to take at the time. Detailed pictures were taken of the events.

Donations amounting to ¥38,000 were gathered (2047) and these supported the relief and restoration effort. The Japanese Red Cross organization was involved in the relief effort, having been formed the previous year (1887) following an eruption. This was its first peacetime involvement in disaster relief. A monument was erected in Goshikinuma to honour those who helped the relief effort.

== Sacred Mountains ==
The Enichi Temple, located on the south-western foot of the Bandai Mountain, is surrounded by mountains where people come to worship; Mount Bandai (north east to the temple), Mount Mayadake (north to the temple), and Mount Azuma (north to Mount Bandai). The temple has served a central role in mountain worship because of its location. The Enichi Temple was founded in 807 AD, one year after Mount Bandai erupted. Some people think that there is a connection between the eruption and the foundation of the Enichi Temple. Several routes for visiting Azumayama Shrine have been established, all originating from the main temple of the Enichi shrine.

== See also ==
- List of volcanoes in Japan
- Bandai Highland
