= Bandai-Asahi National Park =

National park in Tōhoku, Japan

- 磐梯朝日国立公園
- IUCN category II (national park)
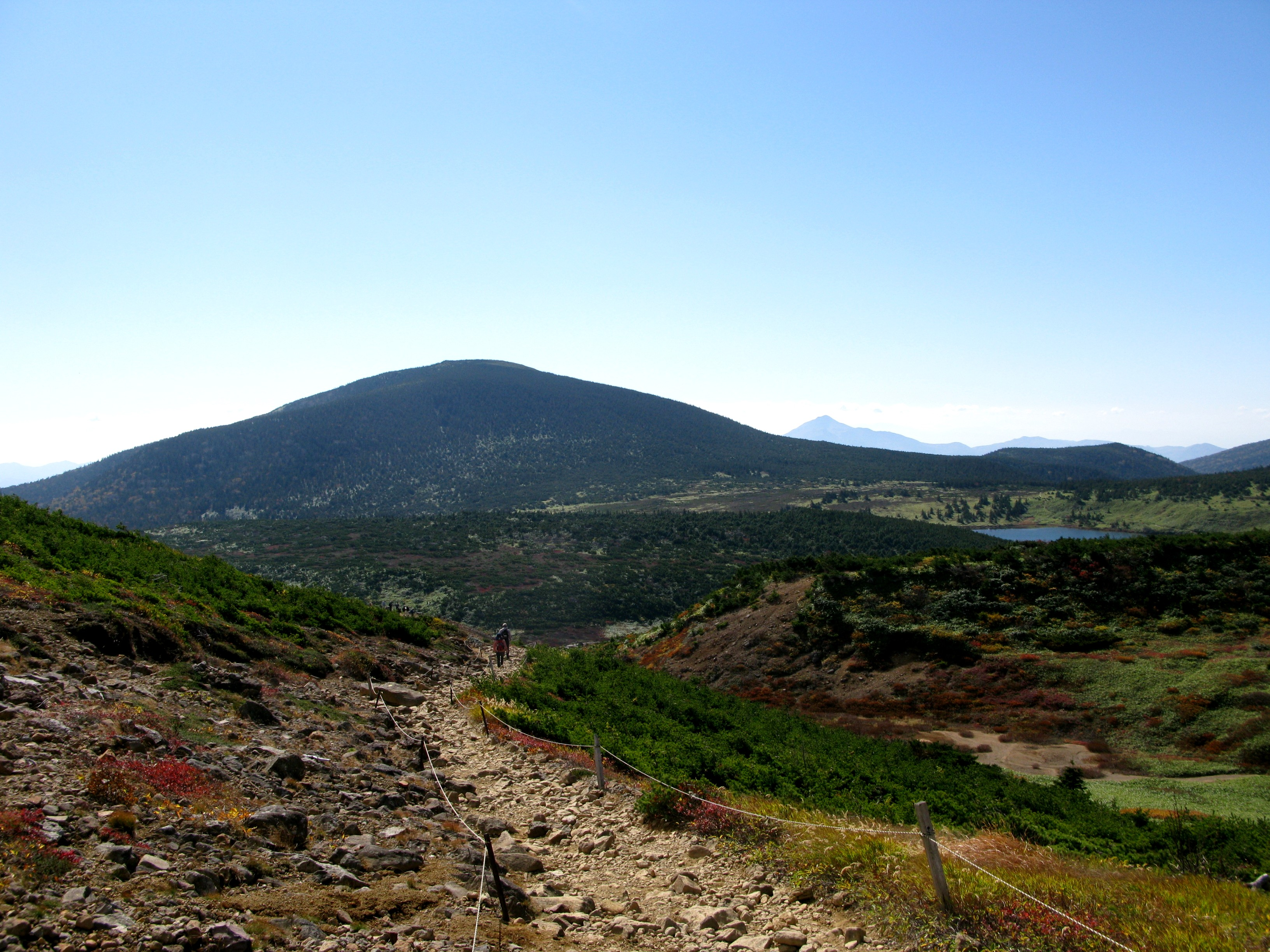
- Mt. Higashi-Azuma, from Mount Issaikyō

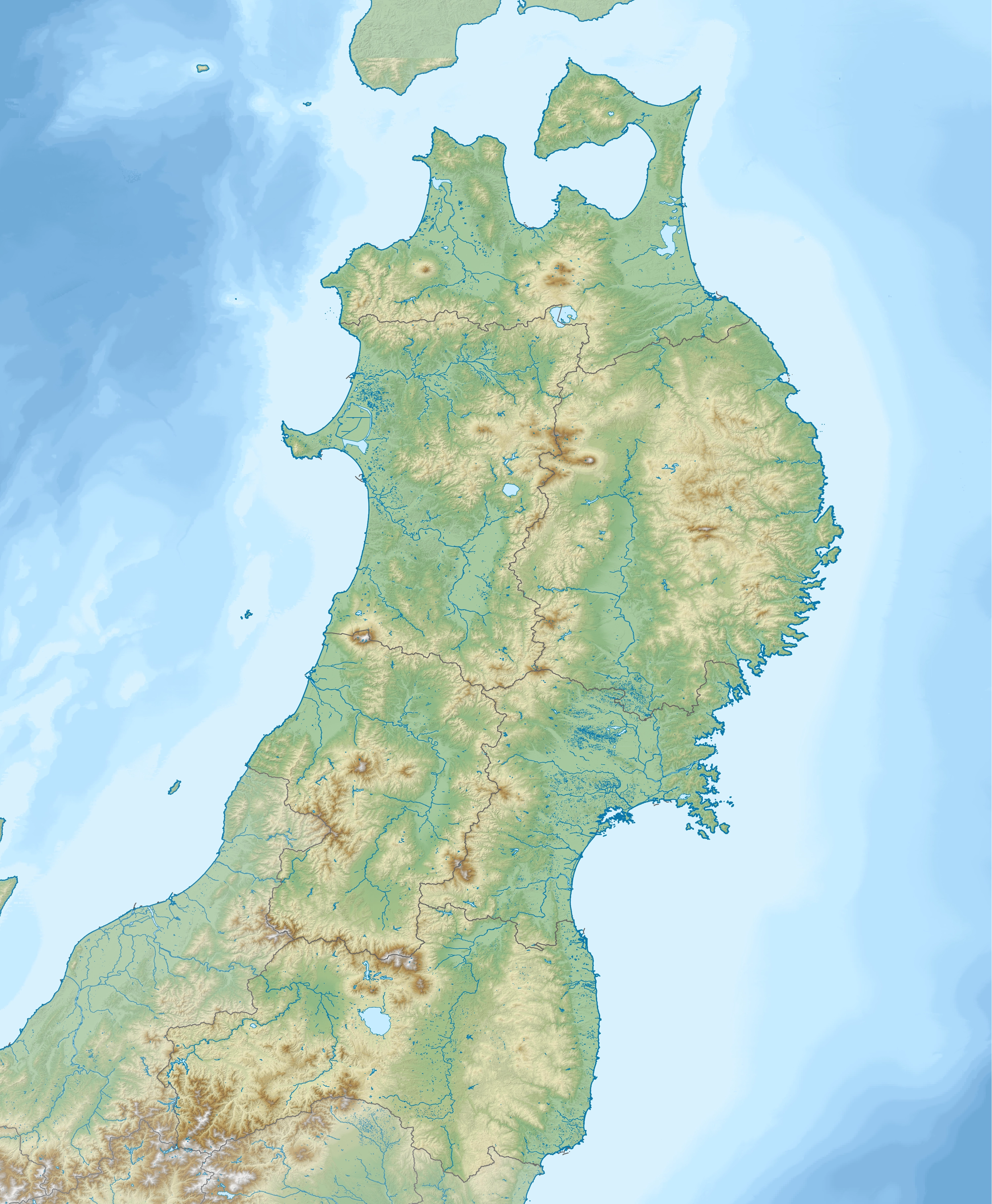
- Location within Tohoku, Japan Location within Japan
- Location: Honshū, Japan
- Coordinates: 37°49′N 139°44′E
- Area: 1,870.41 km^{2} (722.17 sq mi)
- Established: September 5, 1950
- Governing body: Ministry of the Environment (Japan)

Bandai-Asahi National Park (磐梯朝日国立公園, Bandai Asahi Kokuritsu Kōen) is a national park in the Tōhoku region, Honshū, Japan. The park site straddles Fukushima Prefecture, Yamagata Prefecture, and Niigata Prefecture and was designated as a national park on September 5, 1950. The park encompasses 186,404 ha of land (making it the third- largest national park in Japan), consisting of three independent units: the Dewasanzan-asahi Region, Iide Region, and Bandaiazuma-Inawashiro Region.

== Dewasanzan-Asahi Region ==
The Dewasanzan-Asahi Region is the most northern unit of the park. The northern portion of the Region consists of mountains called the Three Mountains of Dewa (出羽三山, Dewasanzan). The southern section of the region resides on the Asahi Range. National Route 112 separates these two mountain areas.

=== Dewasanzan ===
The Three Mountains of Dewa refer to Mount Gassan, Mount Haguro, and Mount Yudono, which resides roughly at the center of Yamagata Prefecture. The name "Dewa" refers to the name of the old province, current Yamagata and Akita Prefecture. The mountain range is a natural divider between the two major flat areas present in the prefecture: the Shōnai Region to the west and the Yamagata Basin to the east. The mountains have been deemed as a holy area to the religion of Shugendō and attracted many visitors for pilgrimage to the shrines located on their peaks and Japanese mountain ascetic hermits who practice the strict doctrine. Although the location attracts a considerable number of visitors, most of them are tourists who do not practice the Shugendō teachings. Mount Gassan is a stratovolcano and rises to the height of 1984 m. The area contains marshes and subalpine forests with many plants that grown in alpine meadows, including usagi-giku (arnica unalaschcensis), and rare animals such as ermine and alpine accentor. The renowned haiku poet Matsuo Bashō made a haiku at this site during his journey Oku no Hosomichi in 1689:

雲の峰幾つ崩れて月の山
Kumo no mine/ ikutsu kuzure te/ tsuki no yama

The location also attracts many skiers in winter and some who want to enjoy the sport till mid-July.

=== Asahi Range ===
The Asahi Range is located on the border between Niigata Prefecture and Yamagata Prefecture and constitutes the most northern segment of the Echigo Range. The main peak, Ōasahi Dake, rises to 1,870 m above sea level and is ranked among the 100 Famous Japanese Mountains. The range is a massif stretching 60 km from north to south and 30 km from east to west. It is one of the snowiest places in Japan and snowpacks stay in summer. The mountains feature deep canyons with alpine plants on their ridges and pristine Japanese beech forests on their lower slopes.

The source of the Sagae River, famous for its clear water, is located in the Yamagata Prefecture side. The river, a tributary of the Mogami River, flows out of Ōasahi Dake toward north and changes course to the east after passing Sagae Dam. The National Highway Route 112 and the Yamagata Expressway run parallel to the river. The massive dam scales 112 m tall, the largest in the prefecture, and started its operation in 1990. Prior to its construction, the negotiation over the relocation issue between the government and residents derailed, and it took 19 years from the initial planning to the start of its operation. The Gassan Reservoir covers 340 ha of area and has a large population of ayu, rainbow trout, salvelinus, and seema. The reservoir is equipped with the Gassan Reservoir Large Fountain, from which water can reach as high as 112 m. From April to November, the fountain shoots up water once at each hour between 10 a.m. to 5 p.m. The village of Sage is the setting for the NHK TV drama series Oshin.

A deciduous forest mainly consisting of Japanese beech covers the mountains up to 1200 m above sea level. The vegetation shifts to shrubs from 1200 m. The area, designated as wildlife refuge by the government in 1984, is inhabited by a wide variety of animals including Japanese dormouse, Japanese serow, Asian black bear, golden eagle, mountain hawk-eagle, goshawk, and peregrine falcon.

== Iide Region ==
The Iide Region is the south-western unit of the park.

The Iide mountain range comprises the northern portion of the Echigo Range. The largest land mass of the range is the Iide Massif and surrounded by the Arakawa River to the north, National Highway Route 121 to the east, the Agano River to the south, and the Echigo Plain to the east. From the range visible on sunny days are the Asahi Range, Mt. Azuma, and Aizu Basin, Mt. Nasu and the Sea of Japan. The highest peak is Mt Dainichi, 2128 m in height, followed by other 2000 m peaks: Mt. Iide (2105 m), Mt. Eboshi (2017 m), Mt Kitamata (2025 m), and Mt. Onishi (2013 m). The mountain range has readily available trails on all four sides, but large snowpacks remain all year on many of its peaks, as they sometimes called the Tōhoku Alps. The site also draws attention because of its blooming alpine flowers. Mt. Iide ranks among Japan's 100 Famous Mountains.

Mt. Iide is also famous as a sacred place to the ascetic religion of Shugendō along with the Three Mountains of Dewa. In 652, En no Ozunu started the practice of the teachings on this mountain, since then many Yamabushi have visited this location. During the Meiji period, the Iide Shrine located on the summit was worshipped by local residents. Till the Pacific War, the climbing to the mountain was prohibited to women. The region used to have a local custom of considering only men who climbed the mountain before the age of 15 as grown men.

== Bandaiazuma-Inawashiro Region ==
The Bandaiazuma-Inawashiro Region is the south-eastern unit of the park.

== Visitor centers ==
=== Gassan Visitor Center ===
The Gassan Visitor Center is located in the Dewasanzan area. It takes one hour from Sakata and forty minutes from Tsuruoka by car. By bus, ride the Shōnai Kōtsu Bus that heads to the Mt Haguro summit at JR Tsuruoka Station for 50 minutes and get off at the Arasawa Temple. The center can provide information on the landscapes, geography, geology, flora and fauna, and environment of the region. The building contains exhibits and a theater where slides are shown.

== See also ==
- List of national parks of Japan
