= Snowbelt =

Region in North America where heavy snowfall is common

Coordinates: 43°N 78°W

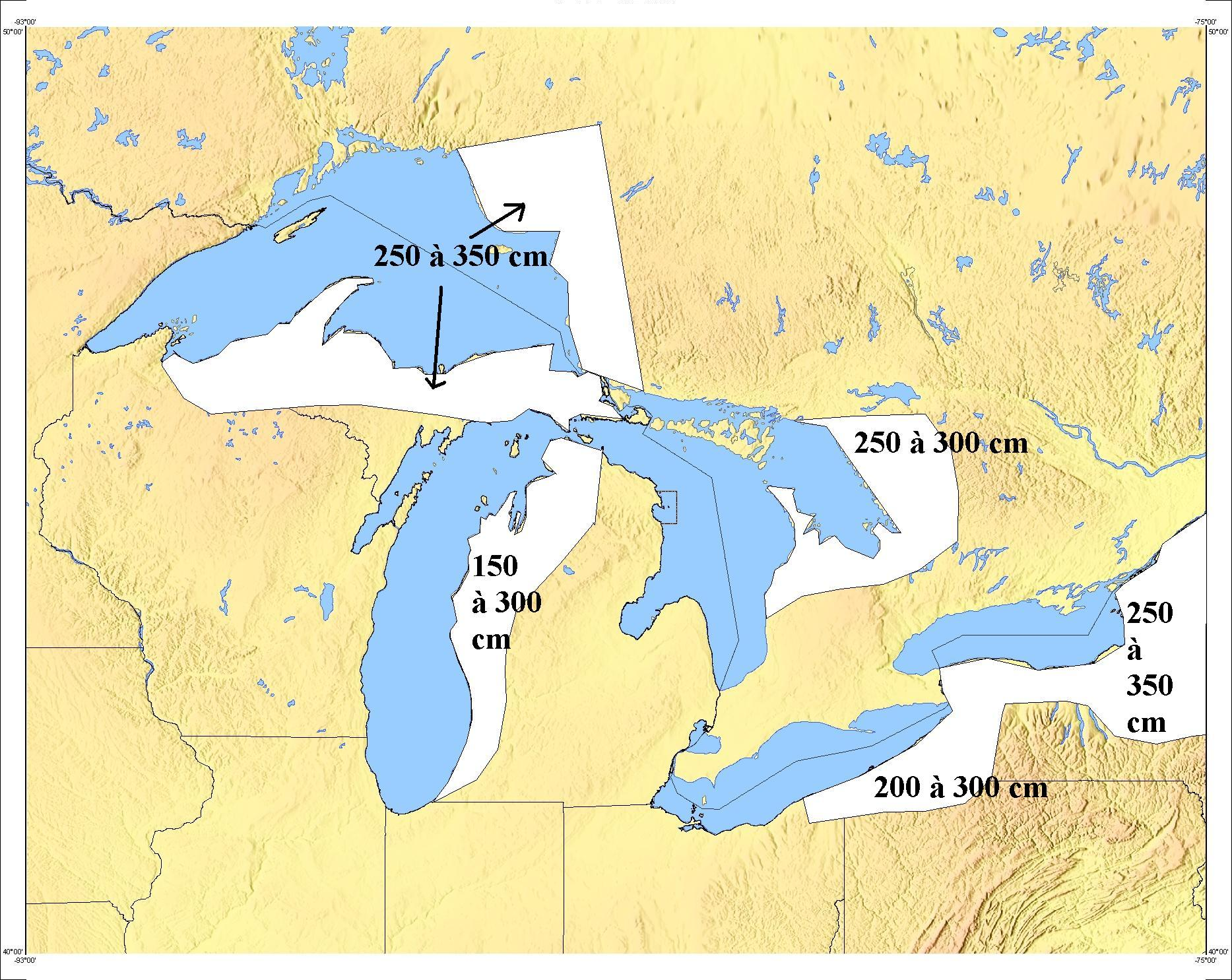
Map showing the snowbelts around the Great Lakes of North America with 150 cm (60 in) accumulations or more during winter

The Snowbelt, Snow Belt, Frostbelt, or Frost Belt is the region near the Great Lakes in North America where heavy snowfall in the form of lake-effect snow is particularly common. Snowbelts are typically found downwind of the lakes, principally off the eastern and southern shores.

== Cause ==
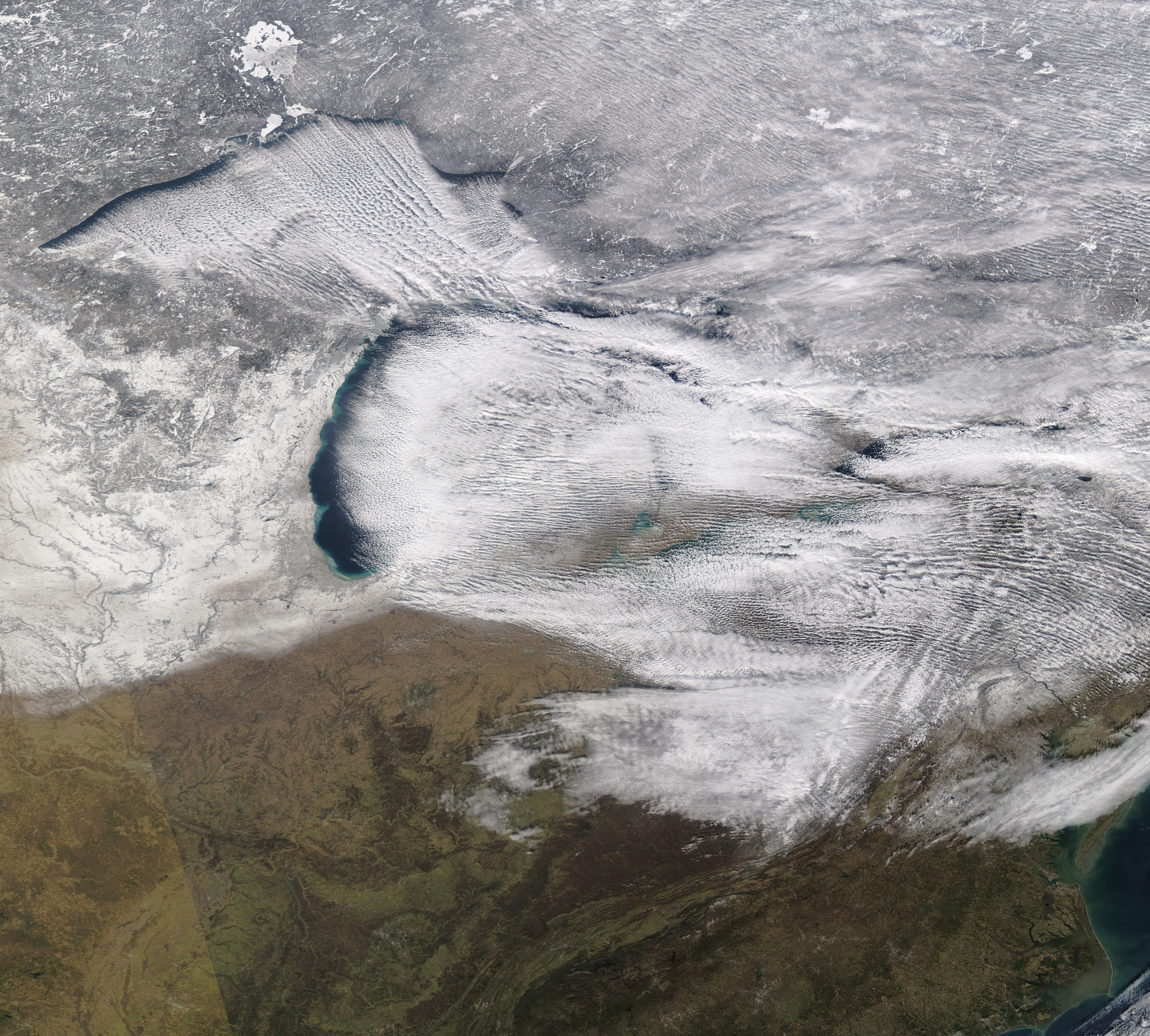
Lake-effect snow is the cause of the regional nickname.

Lake-effect snow occurs when cold air moves over warmer water, taking up moisture that later precipitates as snow when the air moves over land and cools. The lakes produce snowsqualls and persistently cloudy skies throughout the winter, as long as air temperatures are colder than water temperatures, or until a lake freezes over.

== Location ==
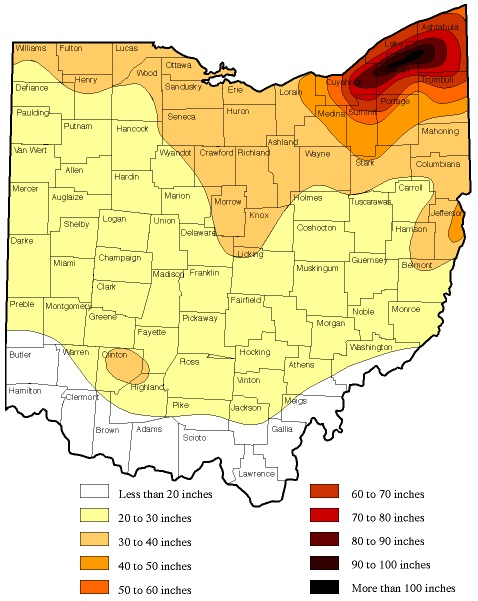
Northeast Ohio Primary and Secondary Snow Belts

In the United States, snowbelts are located southeast of Lake Erie from Cleveland, Ohio, to Buffalo, New York, and south of Lake Ontario stretching roughly from Rochester, New York, over Syracuse, New York, to Utica, New York, and northward to Watertown, New York. Other snowbelts are located on the eastern shore of Lake Michigan from Gary, Indiana, northward through Western Michigan and Northern Michigan to the Straits of Mackinac, and on the eastern and southern shores of Lake Superior from northwest Wisconsin through the northern half of the Upper Peninsula of Michigan.

Portions of the snowbelt are located in Ontario, Canada, which includes the eastern shore of Lake Superior from Sault Ste. Marie northward to Wawa, as well as the eastern and southern shores of Lake Huron and Georgian Bay from Parry Sound to London. During the winter, north-westerly winds cause frequent road closures, with Highway 21 on the Lake Huron coast and Highway 26 south of Georgian Bay as far east as Barrie, Ontario, being strongly affected. The Niagara Peninsula and the north-eastern shores of Lake Ontario are especially hard-hit by heavy snowfall when south-western winds are predominant.

Lake Erie is the shallowest and second smallest of the five Great Lakes. It can completely freeze over during winter. Once frozen, lake-effect snow over land to the east and south of Lake Erie is temporarily alleviated. This does not end the possibility of a damaging winter storm. The Great Lakes Blizzard of 1977 that struck metropolitan Buffalo was a direct result of powder snow blown by high winds off Lake Erie, which had frozen earlier than normal. There was, for the region, no significant snowfall during the duration of the blizzard.

The southern and southeastern sides of the Great Salt Lake in Utah receive significant lake-effect snow. Since the Great Salt Lake never freezes, the lake effect can influence the weather along the Wasatch Front year-round. The lake effect largely contributes to the 55-to-80-inch (140 to 200 cm) annual snowfall amounts recorded south and east of the lake, and an average snowfall reaching 500 inches (13 m) in the Wasatch Range. The snow, which is often very light and dry because of the semiarid climate, is referred to as the "Greatest Snow on Earth" in the mountains. Lake-effect snow contributes to roughly six to eight snowfalls per year in Salt Lake City, with about 10% of the city's precipitation being contributed by the phenomenon.

== Effects of climate change ==
Climate change will likely have a significant effect on the future of weather events on the snowbelt. On one hand, as temperatures increase in the area of the Great Lakes, making them free of ice for longer periods of time, snowfall could increase during lake-effect snow events and extend lake-effect snow season if the air is cold enough for snow. However the air that flows over the rivers and can create lake-effect snow will also generally become warmer over time which could lead to less overall snow and more overall lake-effect rain. The second effect will more likely affect southern lake effect regions faster as they will warm up quicker due to their more southern location.

== Skiing industries ==
Healthy skiing industries have been established in snowbelt regions located near major cities such as Buffalo and Toronto. The Erie/Ontario snowbelt, which extends to the northern slopes of the Allegheny Plateau, has lent the region its nickname: ski country. To the south of Georgian Bay, ski resorts are found on the Niagara Escarpment at Blue Mountain and on the Oro Moraine.

== Outside North America ==
Ocean-effect snow conditions are found on the west side of the Japanese island of Hokkaido and the west side of Russia's Kamchatka Peninsula. There, cold winds blowing outward from the Siberian winter high pressure system pick up moisture while crossing the Sea of Japan and the Sea of Okhotsk and release it as heavy snowfall in Japan's snow country.

Sweden's east coast can be affected by similar conditions, particularly in the early winter when there is little ice on the Baltic Sea.

== See also ==
- Banana belt
- Great Salt Lake effect
- Lake-effect snow
- Snow country (Japan)
