= Lake effect snow watch =

Bulletin issued by the National Weather Service

A lake effect snow watch was a bulletin issued by the National Weather Service in the United States to warn of heavy snowfall amounts that will be possible from convective snow generated by cold air masses passing over unfrozen lakes (lake effect snow). The criteria for amounts may vary over different county warning areas.

On October 2, 2017, issuance of the Lake Effect Snow Watch has been discontinued, and a winter storm watch is now issued when the above criteria are expected to be met.

== Example ==
MNZ020-037-181845-
/O.NEW.KDLH.LE.A.0004.081219T0600Z-081220T0600Z/
SOUTHERN LAKE/LAKESHORE-CARLTON/SOUTHERN ST. LOUIS-
443 AM CST THU DEC 18 2008

...LAKE EFFECT SNOW WATCH IN EFFECT FROM LATE TONIGHT THROUGH
FRIDAY EVENING...

THE NATIONAL WEATHER SERVICE IN DULUTH HAS ISSUED A LAKE EFFECT
SNOW WATCH...WHICH IS IN EFFECT FROM LATE TONIGHT THROUGH FRIDAY
EVENING.)

LAKE EFFECT SNOW WILL DEVELOP AROUND MIDNIGHT TONIGHT...AND LAST
THROUGH MUCH OF FRIDAY AND INTO FRIDAY EVENING. THE HEAVIEST OF
THE SNOW WILL FALL ALONG THE HIGHER TERRAIN FROM DULUTH TO SILVER
BAY...WHERE THE POTENTIAL EXISTS FOR UP TO 8 INCHES IN ISOLATED
AREAS. THE HEAVIEST OF THE SNOW LOOKS TO FALL EARLY FRIDAY MORNING
AROUND THE TIME OF THE MORNING COMMUTE.

A LAKE EFFECT SNOW WATCH MEANS THE POTENTIAL EXISTS FOR HEAVY
ACCUMULATION OF LAKE-EFFECT SNOW. TRAVEL AND COMMERCE MAY BE
SIGNIFICANTLY AFFECTED. YOU ARE ENCOURAGED TO STAY CURRENT WITH
THE LATEST WEATHER INFORMATION REGARDING THIS DEVELOPING WINTER
STORM VIA LOCAL TELEVISION...RADIO...THE INTERNET...OR NOAA
WEATHER RADIO.

$$

LONKA

== See also ==
- Lake effect snow advisory
- Lake effect snow warning
- Snowsquall
