= Okama =

Okama may refer to:

== Common uses ==
- A Japanese honorific term for a pot, kettle, or cauldron, such as a chagama
- A Japanese slang term for a homosexual man, especially one who is effeminate or cross-dresses

== Places ==
- Okama, Plateaux Region, Togo
- Okama, a volcanic crater lake on Mount Zaō, Japan

== Other uses ==
- Okama (artist) (born 1974), Japanese manga artist and illustrator
