= Mount Zaō =

Complex of volcanoes on the island of Honshu, Japan

Zaō Mountains
- 蔵王連峰
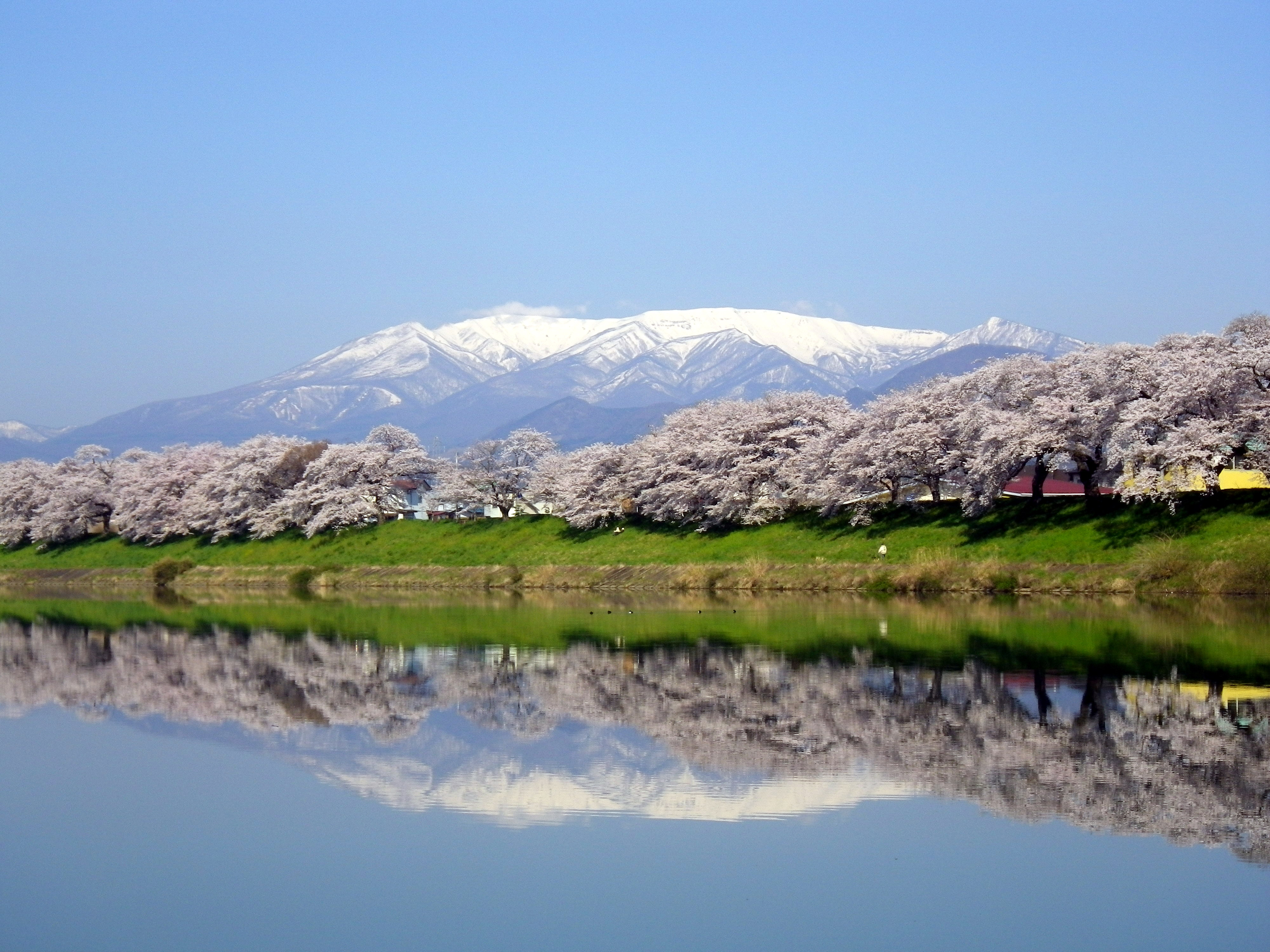
- The Zaō Mountains as seen from the Shiroishi River, an Abukuma River tributary, at the cherry blossom season

Highest point
- Elevation: 1,841 m (6,040 ft)
- Listing: Mountains of Japan; Volcanoes of Japan
- Coordinates: 38°08′38″N 140°26′24″E

Geography
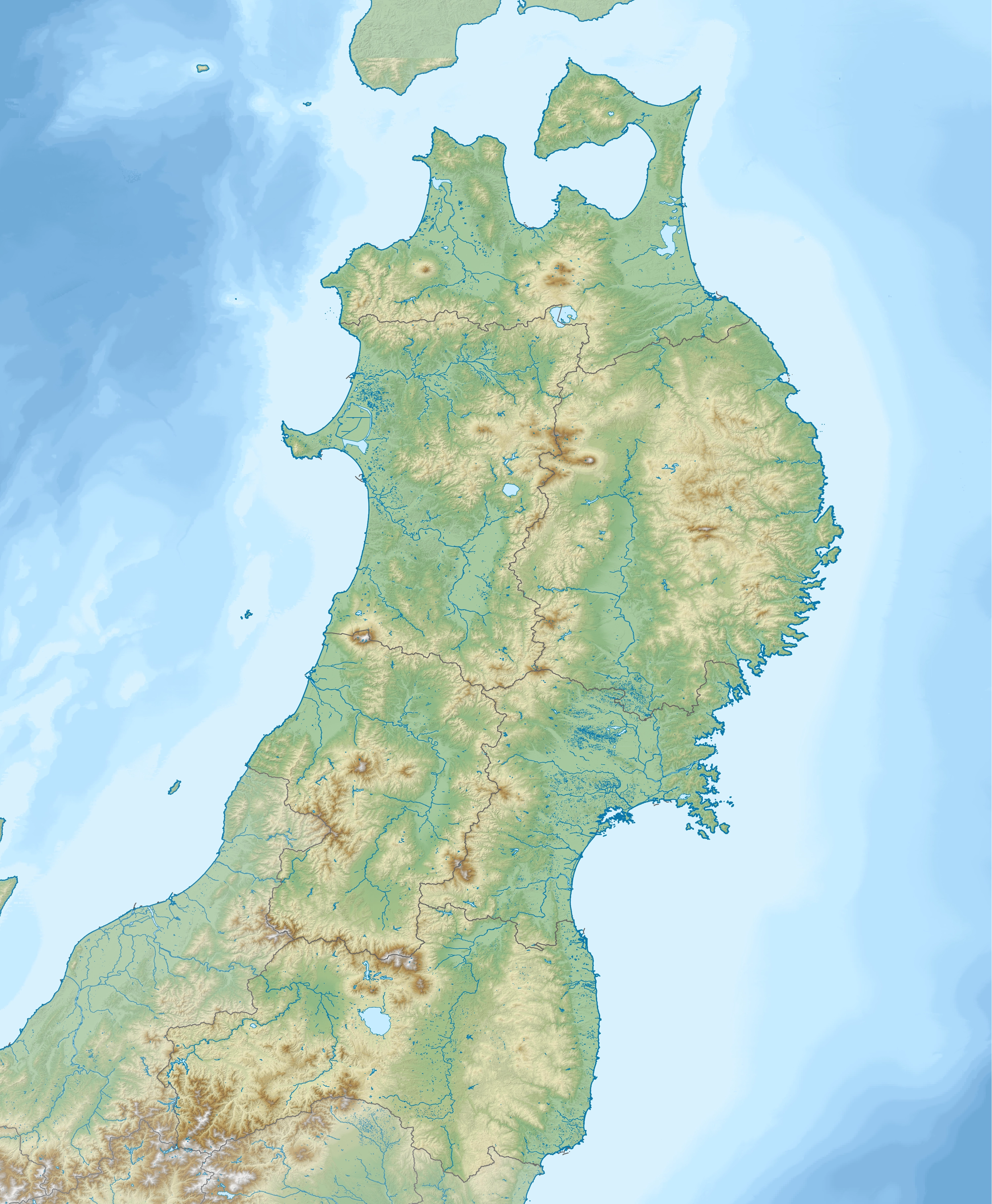
- Location within Tohoku, Japan Location within Japan
- Country: Japan
- Island: Honshu
- Prefectures: Yamagata; Miyagi

Geology
- Mountain type: Complex volcano
- Volcanic arc: Northeastern Japan Arc
- Last eruption: May 1940

The Zaō Mountains (蔵王連峰, Zaō Renpō), commonly called Mount Zaō, are a complex cluster of stratovolcanoes on the border between Yamagata Prefecture and Miyagi Prefecture in Japan. The central volcano (one of the 100 Famous Japanese Mountains) includes several lava domes and a tuff cone, Goshiki-dake, which contains a crater lake named "Okama". Also known as the "Five Color Pond" (五色沼, goshiki numa) because it changes color depending on the weather, it lies in a crater formed by a volcanic eruption in the 1720s. The lake is 360 metres (1,200 ft) in diameter and 60 m (200 ft) deep, and is one of the main tourist attractions in the area.

One striking feature of Zaō's famous ski resorts are the "frost-covered trees" (樹氷, juhyō) that appear in mid-winter. Mount Zao is, together with Mount Hakkoda and Mount Moriyoshi, regarded as one of the "Three Great Frost-Covered Tree" (Nihon Sandai Juhyō, 日本三大樹氷) sites of Japan, where the phenomenon known as "snow monsters" can be observed. At each mountain, aerial lift operated by the respective ski resorts provide access to areas in close proximity to the frost-covered trees. Strong wind over the nearby lake fling water droplets which freeze against the trees and their branches, until near-horizontal icicles begin to form. Falling snow settles on the ice formations, with the end result being grotesque figure of a tree. The effect of a full forest of such trees gives visitors a ghostly impression, hence they are colloquially known as "snow monsters". Formed under precise meteorological and ecological conditions almost unique to northern Japan, the phenomenon has been decreasing due to climate change.

Rotaria rotatoria and Pinnularia spp. are found in the acidic Okama Lake.

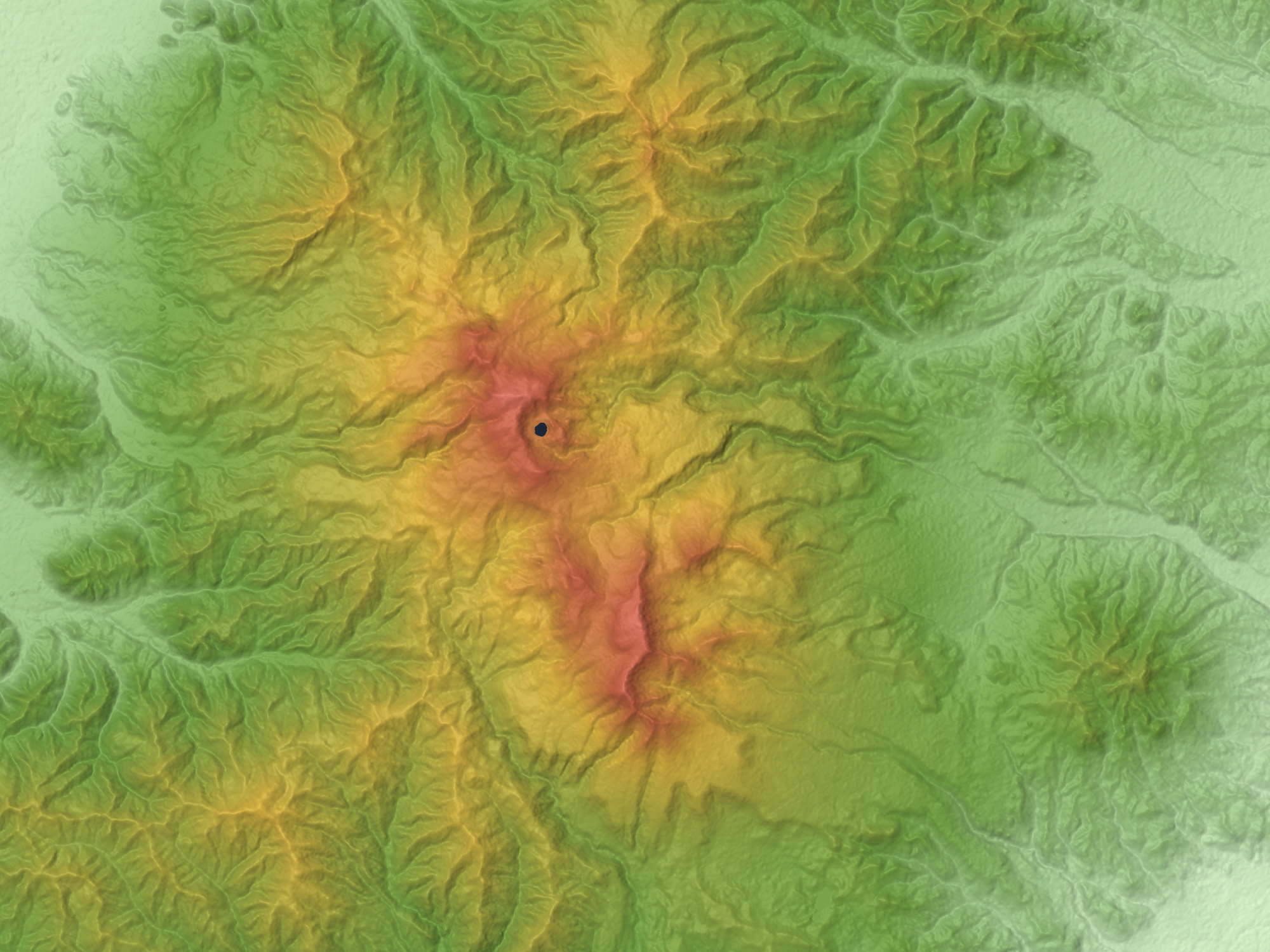
Relief Map

A 3D rendering

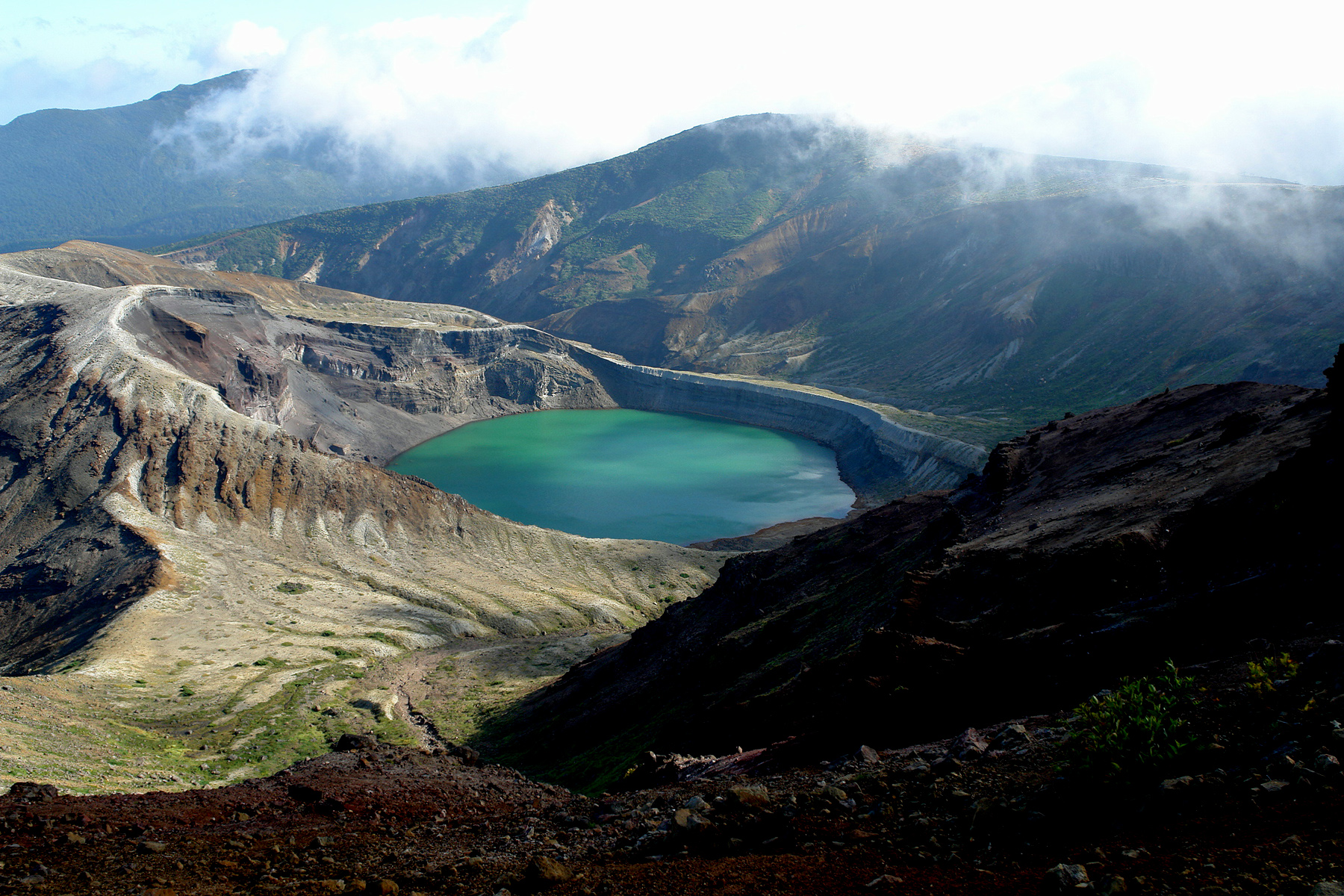
Okama Crater

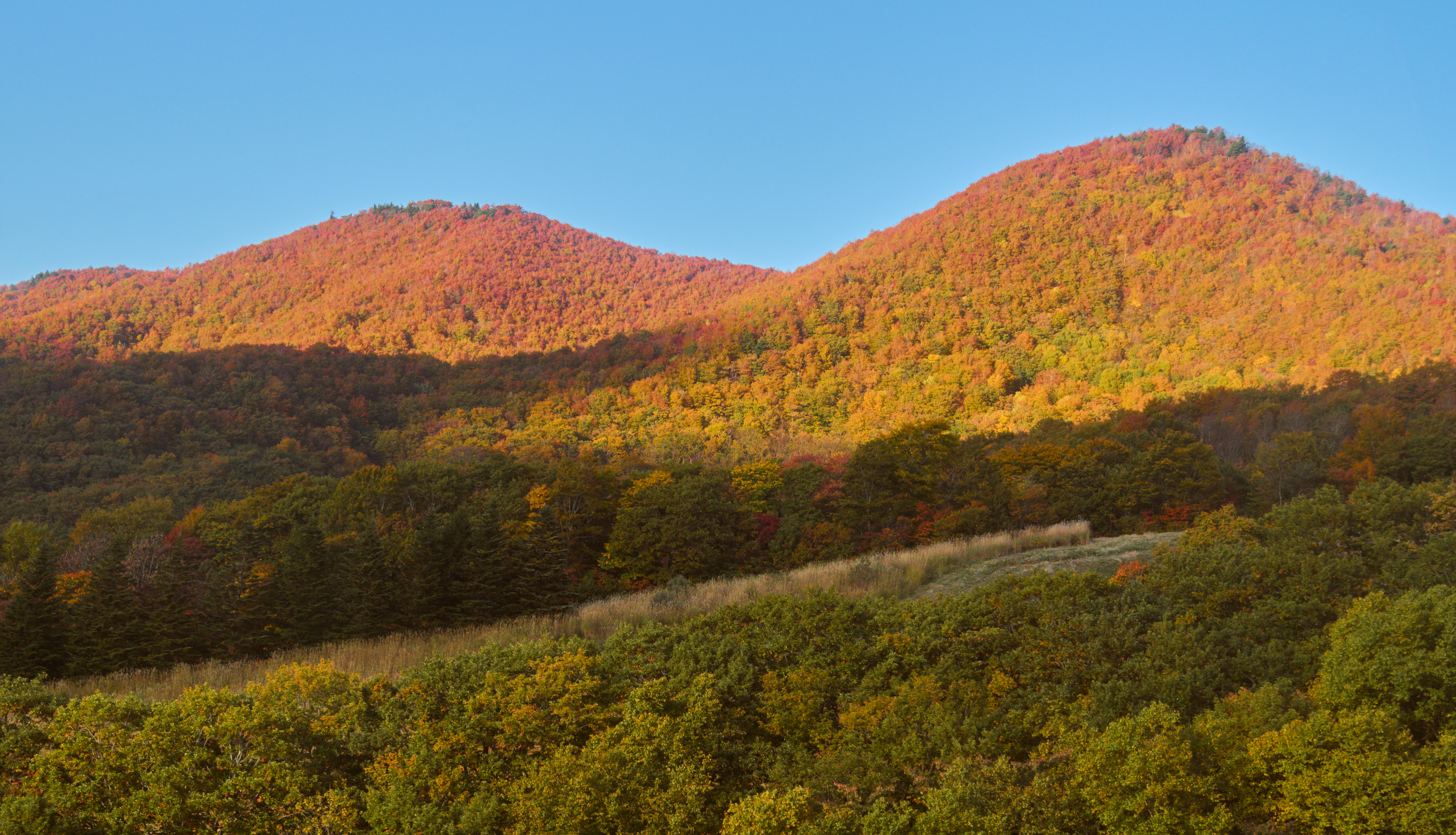
Zao Mountains in autumn

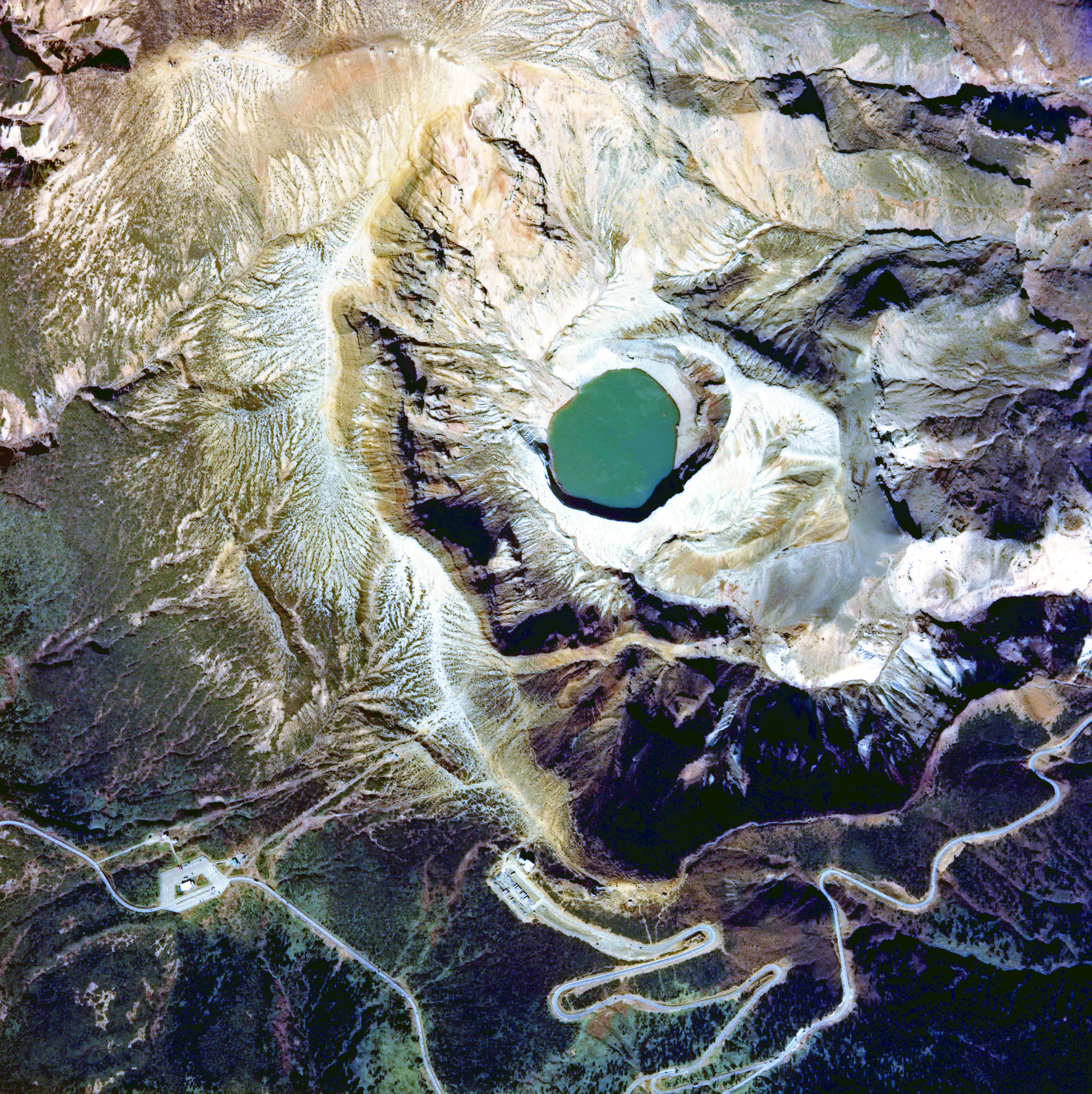
Okama Crater

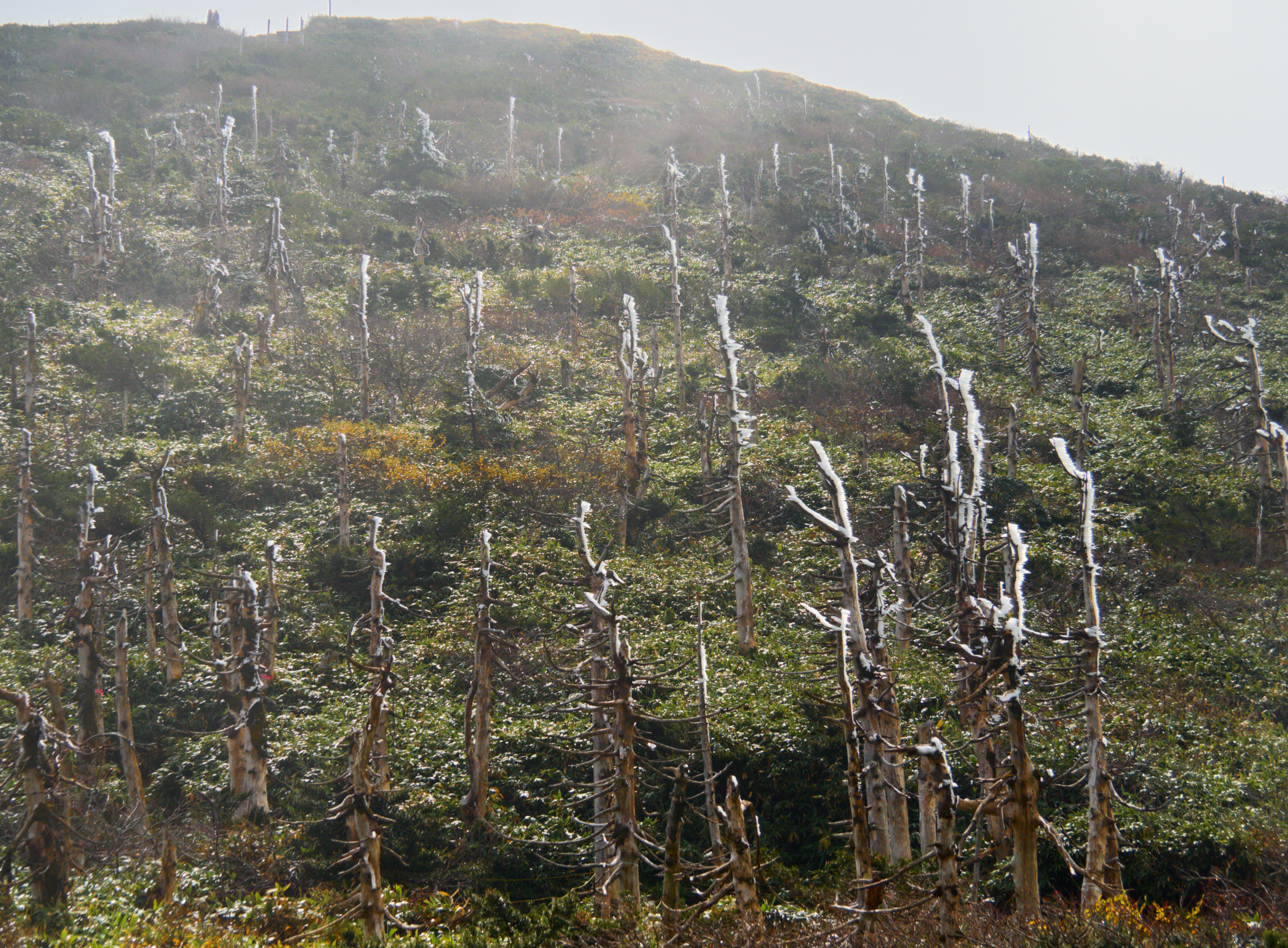
Early winter on Mt. Zao

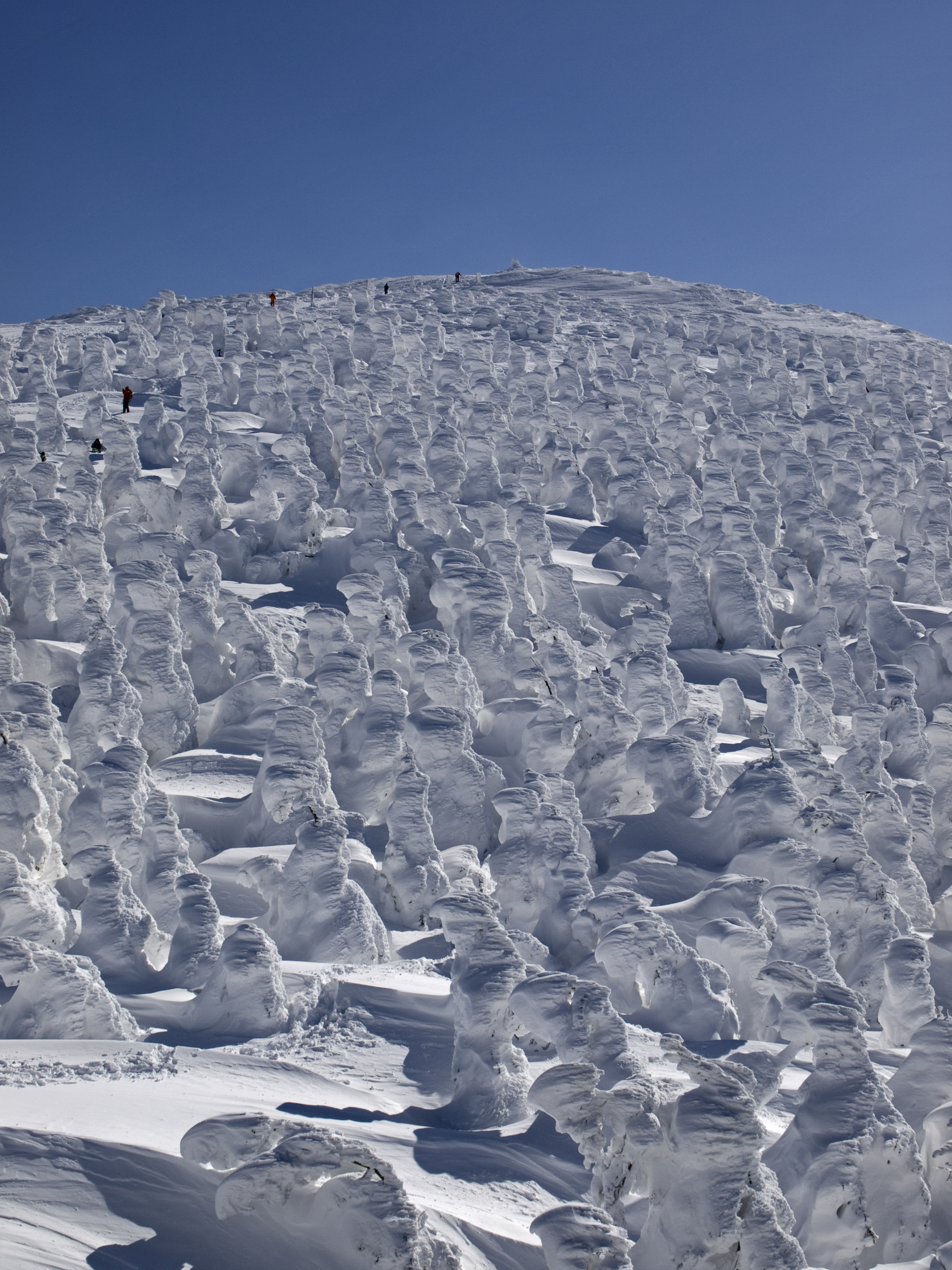
Snow monsters

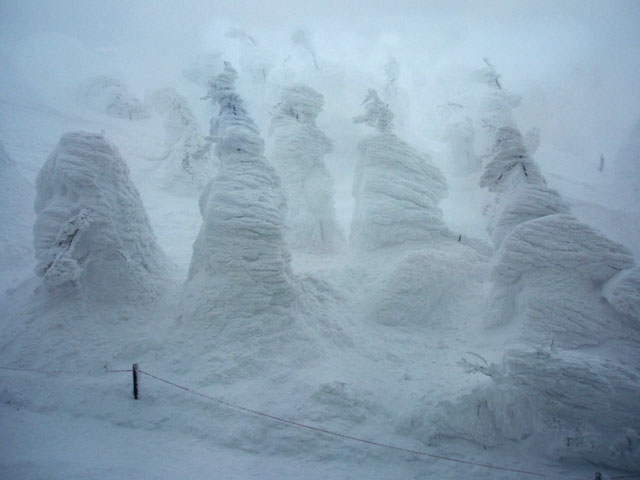
Snow monsters up close

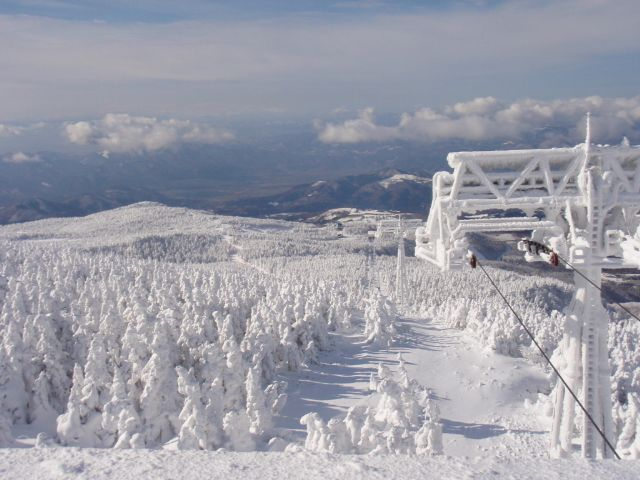
Zaō Ropeway soft rime

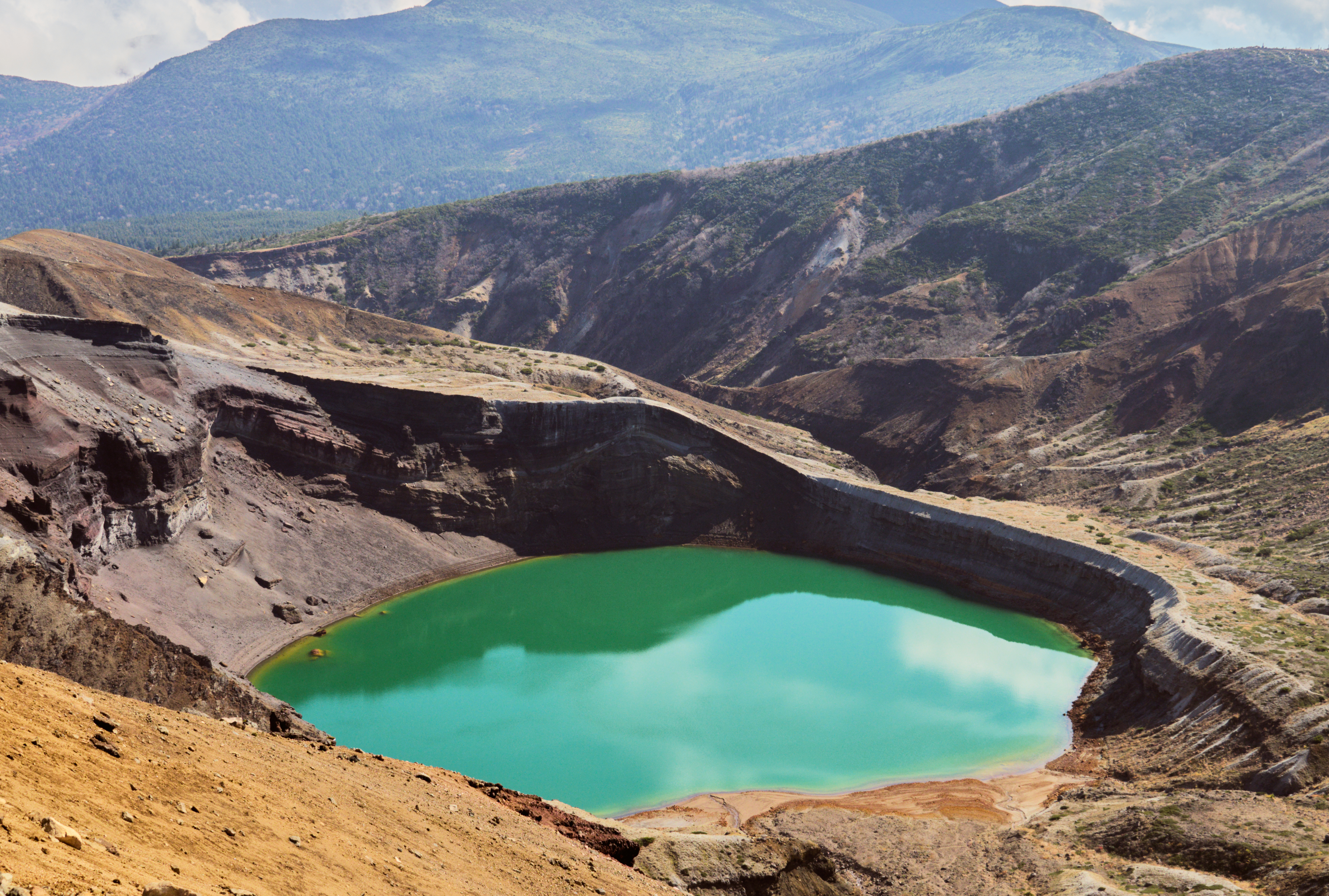
Okama Crater

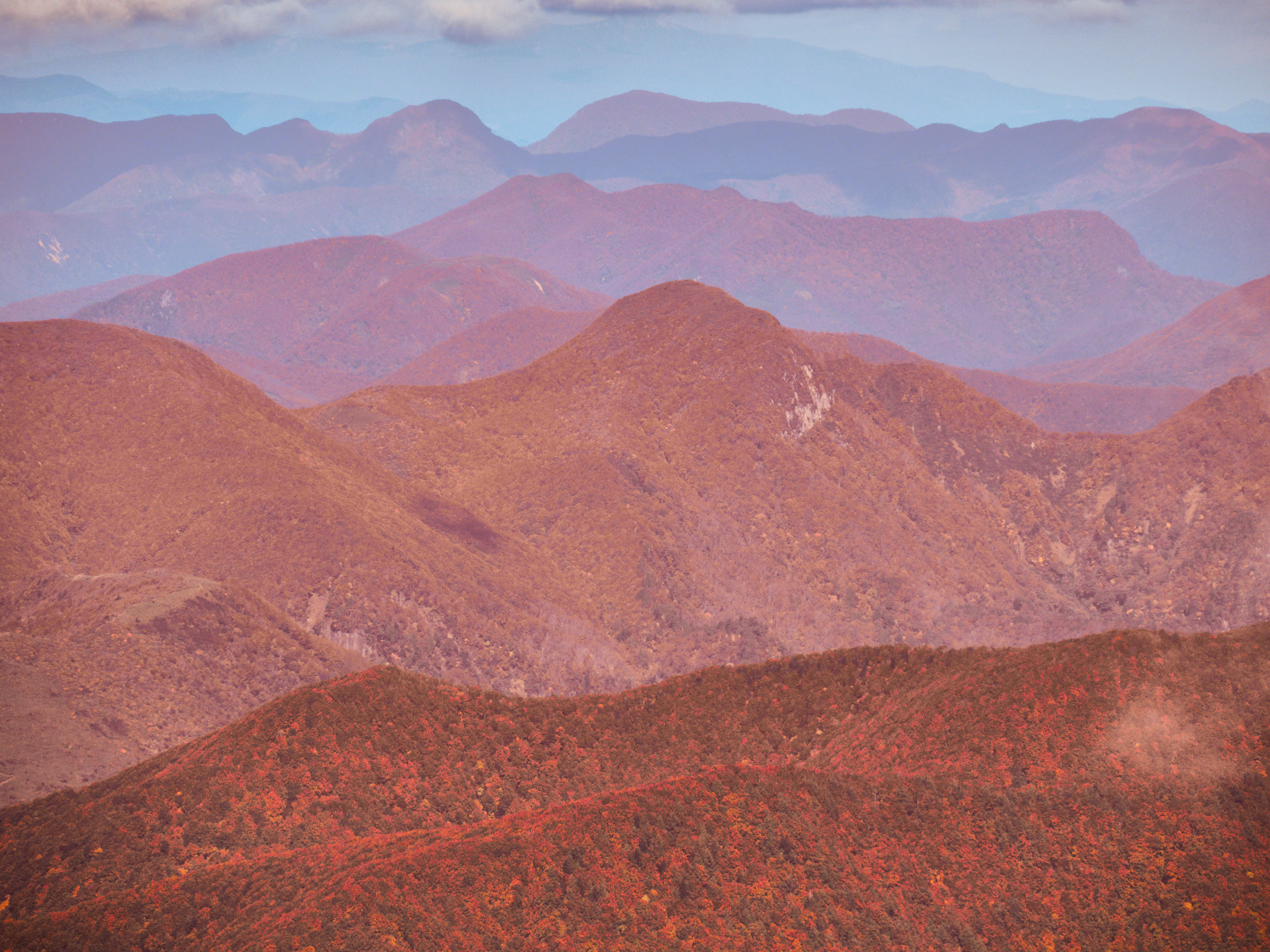
View from Mt. Zao, surrounding mountains in autumn

== See also ==
- Snow country (Japan)
- Zaō Ropeway
