= Great Salt Lake effect =

Lake's influence on local weather and climate

The Great Salt Lake effect is a small but detectable influence on the local climate and weather around the Great Salt Lake in Utah, United States. In particular, snowstorms are a common occurrence over the region and have major socio-economic impacts due to their significant precipitation amounts. The Great Salt Lake almost never freezes and can warm rapidly, which allows lake enhanced precipitation to occur from September through May. Lake-enhanced snowstorms are often attributed to creating what is locally known as "The Greatest Snow on Earth".

== Lake enhancement ==
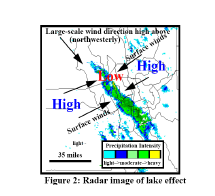
Radar image of enhanced precipitation by the lake and convergence.

Lake-effect snow around the Great Salt Lake is generated in a similar fashion to elsewhere in the world. However, the Great Salt Lake primarily provides a lifting mechanism and acts as an atmospheric destabilizer, which encourages convection. This is in contrast to the Great Lakes, where the lakes contribute significant amounts of moisture and latent heat.

Great Salt Lake enhanced precipitation occurs when a strong, cold, northwesterly wind blows across a relatively warm lake. This is common after a cold front passage, where the winds are predominantly northwesterly and the air is much colder than the lake. When the land-lake breeze blows towards the lake, there is a convergence zone that acts to channel the cold air over the center of the lake and further enhance precipitation. The salinity of the Great Salt Lake prevents freezing but reduces the saturation vapor pressure and latent heat flux into the overlying air. As a result, minimal amounts of moisture and latent heat are added to the air moving over the lake. The high relief of the Wasatch mountains further capitalizes on lake enhancement and can receive multiple feet of snow from lake-effect alone.

== Climatology ==
The number of events varies considerably from year to year, according to the synoptic set-up. The average is 4 to 5 well-defined events annually and the same number of marginal events. Slightly more than half of the well-defined events persist for 13 to 24 hours. In a 2000 study, researchers found that the larger number of cases were between October and February, with outlier cases in September and April or May. However a review of many more cases in 2012 found that the peaks of activity was really in the fall (mid-October to mid-December) and spring (early April) and that there was a minimum between those maximum. That same study found on average 13 events per year, well or not so well defined combined.

Most well-defined events leave accumulations of 8 inches (20 cm) or more, and in some cases more than 40 inches (100 cm), along a well-defined corridor.

== Forecasting lake-effect snow ==
Forecasting skill has drastically improved in recent years due to a better observational network including the NEXRAD weather radar system. An accurate forecast involves identifying the crucial requirements for lake-effect precipitation. The basic requirements are a conditionally unstable environment, significant moisture and a lifting mechanism. Many different variables go into these requirements, which results in a minute-by-minute event. Through extensive analyses and field experiments the understanding of lake-effect snowstorms has improved drastically in recent years. Many general rules of thumb have been developed in order to predict the occurrence, location and severity of lake-effect snow.

=== Rules of thumb ===
A set of rules has been developed by local forecasters to predict the development of lake enhanced snow:

- A strong Northwesterly flow maximizes precipitation for the Salt Lake Valley.
- A minimal temperature difference of 29 °F (16 °C) between the surface and the 700 mbar (70 kPa) height is needed, but not necessarily sufficient in itself to cause lake-effect snow.
- An inversion or stable layer below 700 mbar (70 kPa) has never yielded lake-effect snow.
- Lake-effect snow can occur in concert with synoptic scale storm systems.
- A large lake-land temperature difference favors over-lake convergence.
- Lake-effect is typically initiated during the night when land-breeze convergence is favored and convection occurs predominantly over the lake.
- During the daytime lake-effect precipitation dissipates when solar heating creates scattered widespread convection over the land.
- The 700 mbar winds typically determine the geographic position of the precipitation
- Limited amounts of directional and vertical wind shear tend to produce heavier precipitation events.
- The Great Salt Lake contributes minimal amounts of moisture so that upstream moisture is a crucial variable.

== See also ==
- Lake-effect snow
- Chinook wind
- Lake-effect rain
