= Lake-effect snow =

Weather phenomenon

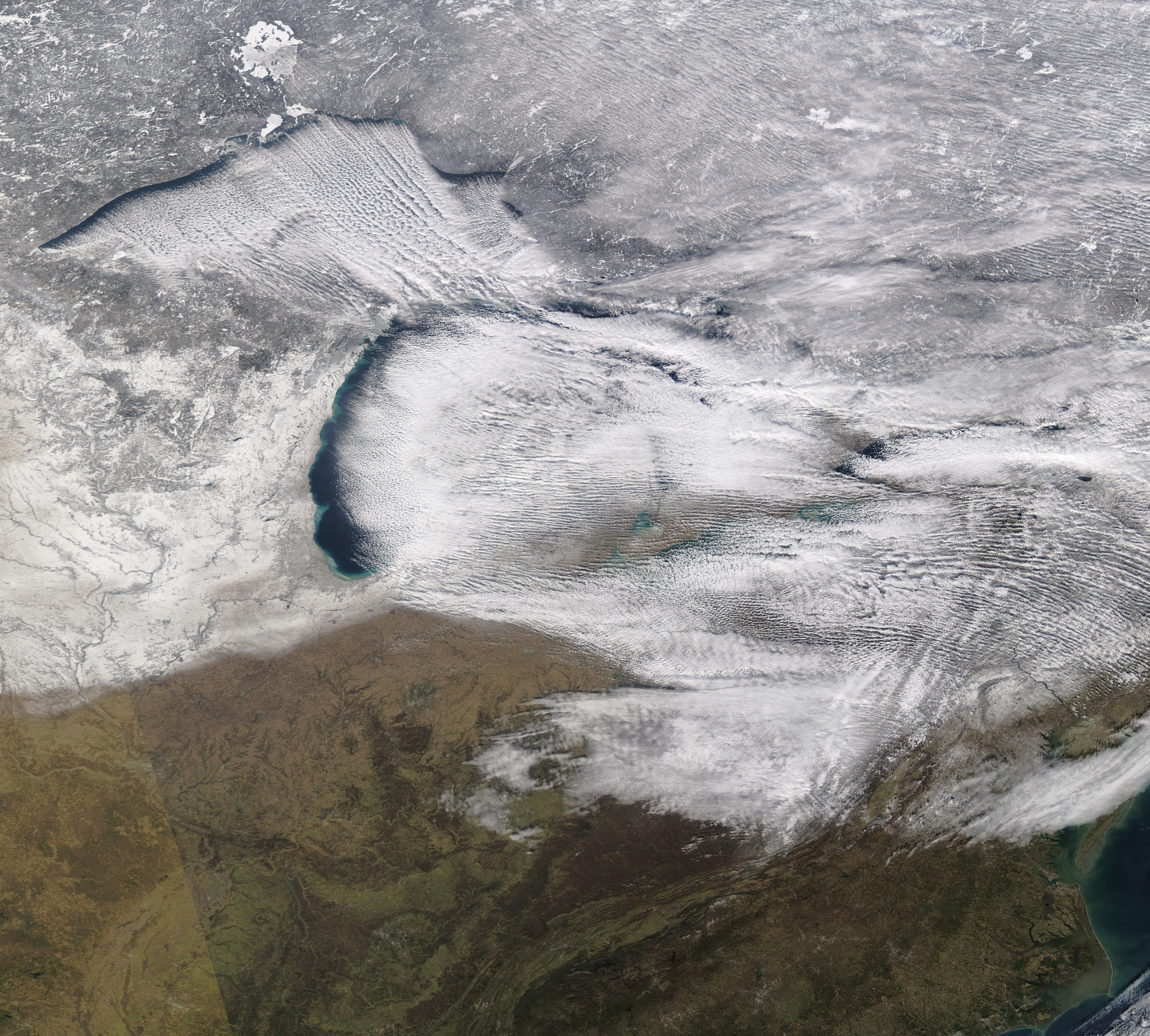
A cold northwesterly to westerly wind over all the Great Lakes created the lake-effect snowfall of January 10, 2022.

Lake-effect snow is produced during cooler atmospheric conditions when a cold air mass moves across long expanses of warmer lake water. The lower layer of air, heated by the lake water, picks up water vapor from the lake and rises through colder air. The vapor then freezes and is deposited on the leeward (downwind) shores.

The same effect also occurs over bodies of saline water, when it is termed ocean-effect or bay-effect snow. The effect is enhanced when the moving air mass is uplifted by the orographic influence of higher elevations on the downwind shores. This uplifting can produce narrow but very intense bands of precipitation, which deposit at a rate of many centimetres of snow each hour, often resulting in a large amount of total snowfall.

The areas affected by lake-effect and parallel "ocean-effect" phenomena are called snowbelts. These include areas east of the Great Lakes in North America, the west coasts of northern Japan, Lake Baikal in Russia, and areas near the Great Salt Lake, Black Sea, Caspian Sea, Baltic Sea, Adriatic Sea, the North Sea and more.

Lake-effect blizzards are the blizzard-like conditions resulting from lake-effect snow. Under certain conditions, strong winds can accompany lake-effect snows creating blizzard-like conditions; however, the duration of the event is often slightly less than that required for a blizzard warning in both the U.S. and Canada.

If the air temperature is low enough to keep the precipitation frozen, it falls as lake-effect snow. If not, then it falls as lake-effect rain. For lake-effect rain or snow to form, the air moving across the lake must be significantly cooler than the surface air (which is likely to be near the temperature of the water surface). Specifically, the air temperature at an altitude where the air pressure is 850 millibars (85 kPa) (roughly 1.5 kilometers or 5,000 feet vertically) should be 13 °C (23 °F) lower than the temperature of the air at the surface. Lake-effect occurring when the air at 850 millibars (85 kPa) is much colder than the water surface can produce thundersnow, snow showers accompanied by lightning and thunder (caused by larger amounts of energy available from the increased instability), and, on very rare occasions, tornadoes.

== Formation ==
Lake-effect snow is produced as cold winds blow clouds over warm waters.

Some key elements are required to form lake-effect precipitation and which determine its characteristics: instability, fetch, wind shear, upstream moisture, upwind lakes, synoptic (large)-scale forcing, orography/topography, and snow or ice cover.

=== Instability ===
A temperature difference of approximately 13 °C (23 °F) between the lake temperature and the height in the atmosphere (about 1,500 m or 5,000 ft) at which barometric pressure measures 850 mbar or 85 kPa provides for absolute instability and allows vigorous heat and moisture transportation vertically. Atmospheric lapse rate and convective depth are directly affected by both the mesoscale lake environment and the synoptic environment; a deeper convective depth with increasingly steep lapse rates and a suitable moisture level allow for thicker, taller lake-effect precipitation clouds and naturally a much greater precipitation rate.

=== Fetch ===
The distance that an air mass travels over a body of water is called fetch. Because most lakes are irregular in shape, different angular degrees of travel yield different distances; typically, a fetch of at least 100 km (60 mi) is required to produce lake-effect precipitation. Generally, the larger the fetch, the more precipitation produced. Larger fetches provide the boundary layer with more time to become saturated with water vapor and for heat energy to move from the water to the air. As the air mass reaches the other side of the lake, the engine of rising and cooling water vapor pans itself out in the form of condensation and falls as snow, usually within 40 km (25 mi) of the lake, but sometimes up to about 150 km (100 mi).

=== Wind shear ===
Directional shear is one of the most important factors governing the development of squalls; environments with weak directional shear typically produce more intense squalls than those with higher shear levels. If directional shear between the surface and the height in the atmosphere at which the barometric pressure measures 700 mb (70 kPa) is greater than 60°, nothing more than flurries can be expected. If the directional shear between the body of water and the vertical height at which the pressure measures 700 mb (70 kPa) is between 30° and 60°, weak lake-effect bands are possible. In environments where the shear is less than 30°, strong, well organized bands can be expected.

Speed shear is less critical but should be relatively uniform. The wind-speed difference between the surface and vertical height at which the pressure reads 700 mb (70 kPa) should be no greater than 40 knots (74 km/h) so as to prevent the upper portions of the band from shearing off. However, assuming the surface to 700 mb (70 kPa) winds are uniform, a faster overall velocity works to transport moisture more quickly from the water, and the band then travels much farther inland.

Temperature difference and instability are directly related, the greater the difference, the more unstable and convective the lake-effect precipitation will be.

=== Upstream moisture ===
A lower upstream relative humidity lake effect makes condensation, clouds, and precipitation more difficult to form. The opposite is true if the upstream moisture has a high relative humidity, allowing lake-effect condensation, cloud, and precipitation to form more readily and in a greater quantity.

=== Upwind lakes ===
Any large body of water upwind impacts lake-effect precipitation to the lee of a downwind lake by adding moisture or pre-existing lake-effect bands, which can reintensify over the downwind lake. Upwind lakes do not always lead to an increase of precipitation downwind.

=== Synoptic forcing ===
Vorticity advection aloft and large upscale ascent help increase mixing and the convective depth, while cold air advection lowers the temperature and increases instability.

=== Orography and topography ===
Typically, lake-effect precipitation increases with elevation to the lee of the lake as topographic forcing squeezes out precipitation and dries out the squall much faster.

=== Snow and ice cover ===
As a lake gradually freezes over, its ability to produce lake-effect precipitation decreases for two reasons. Firstly, the open ice-free liquid surface area of the lake shrinks. This reduces fetch distances. Secondly, the water temperature nears freezing, reducing overall latent heat energy available to produce squalls. To end the production of lake-effect precipitation, a complete freeze is often not necessary.

Even when precipitation is not produced, cold air passing over warmer water may produce cloud cover. Fast-moving mid-latitude cyclones, known as Alberta clippers, often cross the Great Lakes. After the passage of a cold front, winds tend to switch to the northwest, and a frequent pattern is for a long-lasting low-pressure area to form over the Canadian Maritimes, which may pull cold northwestern air across the Great Lakes for a week or more, commonly identified with the negative phase of the North Atlantic Oscillation (NAO). Since the prevailing winter winds tend to be colder than the water for much of the winter, the southeastern shores of the lakes are almost constantly overcast, leading to the use of the term "the Great Gray Funk" as a synonym for winter. These areas allegedly contain populations that suffer from high rates of seasonal affective disorder, a type of psychological depression thought to be caused by lack of light.

== Examples ==
=== North America ===
==== The Great Lakes region ====
Lake effect snow bands over Central New York

Map showing some of the lake-effect snow areas of the United States

Cold winds in the winter typically prevail from the northwest in the Great Lakes region, producing the most dramatic lake-effect snowfalls on the southern and eastern shores of the Great Lakes. This lake effect results in much greater snowfall amounts on the southern and eastern shores compared to the northern and western shores of the Great Lakes.

The most affected areas include the Upper Peninsula of Michigan; Northern New York and Central New York; particularly the Tug Hill Region, Western New York; Northwestern Pennsylvania; Northeastern Ohio; southwestern Ontario and central Ontario; Northeastern Illinois (along the shoreline of Lake Michigan); northwestern and north central Indiana (mostly between Gary and Elkhart); northern Wisconsin (near Lake Superior); and West Michigan.

Lake-effect snows on the Tug Hill plateau (east of Lake Ontario) can frequently set daily records for snowfall in the United States. Tug Hill receives, typically, over 20 feet (240 in; 610 cm) of snow each winter. The snowiest portions of the Tug Hill, near the junction of the towns of Montague, Osceola, Redfield, and Worth, average over 300 inches (760 cm) of snow annually.

From February 3–12, 2007, a lake-effect snow event left 141 inches (358 cm) of snow in 10 days at North Redfield on the Tug Hill Plateau. Other examples major prolonged lake effect snowstorms on the Tug Hill include December 27, 2001, - January 1, 2002, when 127 inches (320 cm) of snow fell in six days in Montague, January 10–14, 1997, when 110.5 inches (281 cm) of snow fell in five days in North Redfield, and January 15–22, 1940, when over eight feet of snow fell in eight days at Barnes Corners.

Syracuse, New York, directly south of the Tug Hill Plateau, receives significant lake-effect snow from Lake Ontario, and averages 115.6 inches (294 cm) of snow per year, which is enough snowfall to be considered one of the "snowiest" large cities in America.

Lake Erie produces a similar effect for a zone stretching from the eastern suburbs of Cleveland through Erie to Buffalo. Remnants of lake-effect snows from Lake Erie have been observed to reach as far south as Garrett County, Maryland, and as far east as Geneva, New York. Because it is not as deep as the other lakes, Erie warms rapidly in the spring and summer, and is frequently the only Great Lake to freeze over in winter. Once frozen, the resulting ice cover alleviates lake-effect snow downwind of the lake. Based on stable isotope evidence from lake sediment coupled with historical records of increasing lake-effect snow, global warming has been predicted to result in a further increase in lake-effect snow.

A very large snowbelt in the United States exists on the Upper Peninsula of Michigan, near the cities of Houghton, Marquette, and Munising. These areas typically receive 250–300 inches (635–762 cm) of snow each season. For comparison, on the western shore, Duluth, Minnesota receives 78 inches (198 cm) per season.

Western Michigan, western Northern Lower Michigan, and Northern Indiana can get heavy lake-effect snows as winds pass over Lake Michigan and deposit snows over Muskegon, Traverse City, Grand Rapids, Kalamazoo, New Carlisle, South Bend, and Elkhart, but these snows abate significantly before Lansing or Fort Wayne. When winds become northerly or aligned between 330° and 030°, a single band of lake-effect snow may form, which extends down the length of Lake Michigan. This long fetch often produces a very intense, yet localized, area of heavy snowfall, affecting cities such as La Porte and Gary.

Because Southwestern Ontario is surrounded by water on three sides, many parts of Southwestern and Central Ontario get a large part of their winter snow from lake-effect snow. This region is notorious for the whiteouts that can suddenly reduce highway visibility on North America's busiest highway (Ontario Highway 401) from clear to zero. The region most commonly affected spans from Port Stanley in the west, the Bruce Peninsula in the north, Niagara-on-the-Lake to the east, and Fort Erie to the south. The heaviest accumulations usually happen in the Bruce Peninsula, which is between Lake Huron and Georgian Bay. So long as the Great Lakes are not frozen over, the only time the Bruce Peninsula does not get lake-effect snow is when the wind is directly from the south.

Studies have suggested that warmer lake surface temperatures can increase evaporation and convective activity, potentially intensifying lake-effect snowfall downwind of the Great Lakes in the future.

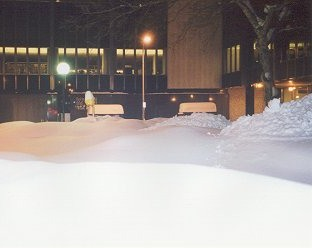
Buffalo, New York, after 82.3 inches (209 cm) of snow fell from December 24, 2001, to December 28, 2001

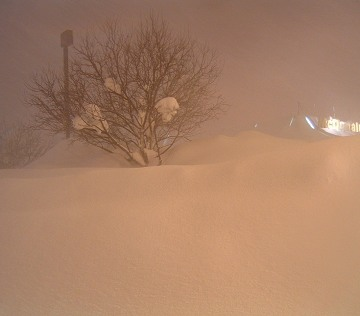
Fulton, New York, after a snowburst dropped 4–6 feet (122–183 cm) of snow over most of Oswego County January 28–31, 2004

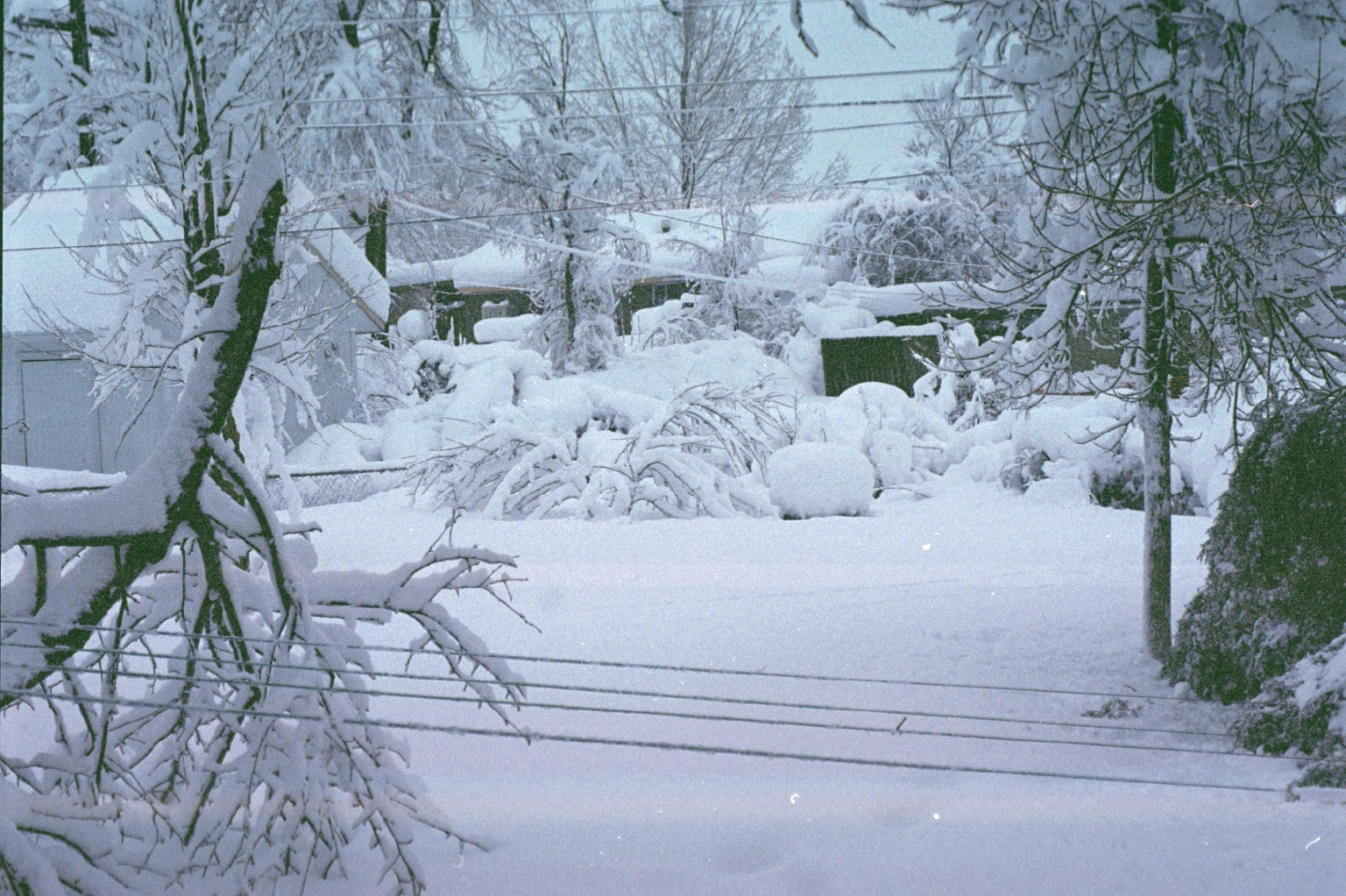
The Veteran's Day storm of November 9–14, 1996. At the height of the storm, over 160,000 customers were without power in Greater Cleveland alone, as the storm produced isolated snowfall tallies approaching 70 inches (178 cm).

==== Elsewhere in the United States ====
The southern and southeastern sides of the Great Salt Lake receive significant lake-effect snow. Since the Great Salt Lake never freezes, the lake effect can influence the weather along the Wasatch Front year-round. The lake effect largely contributes to the 55–80 inches (140–203 cm) annual snowfall amounts recorded south and east of the lake, and in average snowfall reaching 500 inches (13 m) in the Wasatch Range. The snow, which is often very light and dry because of the semiarid climate, is referred to as the "Greatest Snow on Earth" in the mountains. Lake-effect snow contributes to roughly six to eight snowfalls per year in Salt Lake City, with about 10% of the city's precipitation being contributed by the phenomenon.

On one occasion in December 2016, lake-effect snow fell in central Mississippi from a lake band off Ross Barnett Reservoir.

The West Coast occasionally experiences ocean-effect showers, usually in the form of rain at lower elevations south of about the mouth of the Columbia River. These occur whenever an Arctic air mass from western Canada is drawn westward out over the Pacific Ocean, typically by way of the Fraser Valley, returning shoreward around a center of low pressure. Cold air flowing southwest from the Fraser Valley can also pick up moisture over the Strait of Georgia and Strait of Juan de Fuca, then rise over the northeastern slopes of the Olympic Mountains, producing heavy, localized snow between Port Angeles and Sequim, as well as areas in Kitsap County and the Puget Sound region.

While snow of any type is very rare in Florida, the phenomenon of gulf-effect snow has been observed along the northern coast of the Gulf of Mexico a few times in history. More recently, "ocean-effect" snow occurred on January 24, 2003, when wind off the Atlantic, combined with air temperatures in the 30 °F range, brought snow flurries briefly to the Atlantic Coast of northern Florida seen in the air as far south as Cape Canaveral.

=== Eurasia ===
==== Istanbul and northern Turkey ====
Because the southern Black Sea is relatively warm (around 13 °C or 55 °F at the beginning of winter, typically 10 to 6 °C or 50 to 43 °F by the end), sufficiently cold air aloft can create significant snowfalls in a relatively short period of time. Furthermore, cold air, when it arrives to the region, tends to move slowly, creating days and sometimes weeks of occasional lake-effect snowfall.

The most populous city in the region, Istanbul, is very prone to lake-effect snow and this weather phenomenon occurs almost every winter, despite winter averages of 5 °C (41 °F), comparable to Paris. On multiple occasions, lake-effect snowfall events have lasted for more than a week, and official single-storm snow depth totals have exceeded 80 centimeters (2.6 ft; 31 in) downtown and 104 centimeters (3.41 ft; 41 in) around the city. Earlier, unofficial measurements are often higher, due to the relative dearth of sufficiently old weather stations in the region; some sources claim up to 4 meters (13 ft; 160 in) of snowfall during the blizzard of March 1987.

Meanwhile, snowfall in mountainous provinces in this region is amplified by orographic effect, often resulting in snowfall of several meters, especially at higher elevations.

==== Around the Baltic Sea ====
In Northern Europe, cold, dry air masses from Russia can blow over the Baltic Sea and cause heavy snow squalls on areas of the southern and eastern coasts of Sweden, as well as on the Danish island of Bornholm, the east coast of Jutland and the northern coast of Poland. For the northern parts of the Baltic Sea, this happens mainly in the early winter, since it freezes later. Southeast Norway can also experience heavy sea snow events with east-north-easterly winds. Especially, coastal areas from Kragerø to Kristiansand have had incredible snow depths in the past with intense persistent snowbands from Skagerrak (the coastal city of Arendal recorded 280 cm (110 in) in a single week in late February 2007). Although Fennoscandia is lined with an abundance of lakes, this type of snowfall is rare in these, due to the shallow freshwater freezing early in the cold interiors. One notable exception occurred in the middle of May 2008, when Leksand on the long-since unfrozen lake of Siljan received an accumulation of 30 cm (12 in).

==== East Asia ====
The Sea of Japan creates snowfall in the mountainous western Japanese prefectures of Niigata and Nagano, parts of which are known collectively as snow country (Yukiguni). In addition to Japan, much of maritime Korea and the Shandong Peninsula experience these conditions.

==== Siberia ====
Strong winds and a very large, deep lake enhance snowfall around Lake Baikal in the fall; however, nearly the entire surface of the lake freezes from January until Spring, precluding lake-effect snow.

==== Iran ====
Moving of polar or Siberian high-pressure centers along Caspian Sea regarding to relatively warmer water of this sea can make heavy snowfalls in the northern coast of Iran. Several blizzards have been reported in this region during the last decades. In February 2014, heavy snowfall reached 200 cm (79 in) on the coastline in Gilan and Mazandaran provinces of Iran. The heaviest snowfall was reported in Abkenar village near Anzali Lagoon.

IRIMO radar animation of lake effect snow in southern coast of Caspian Sea in the north of Iran

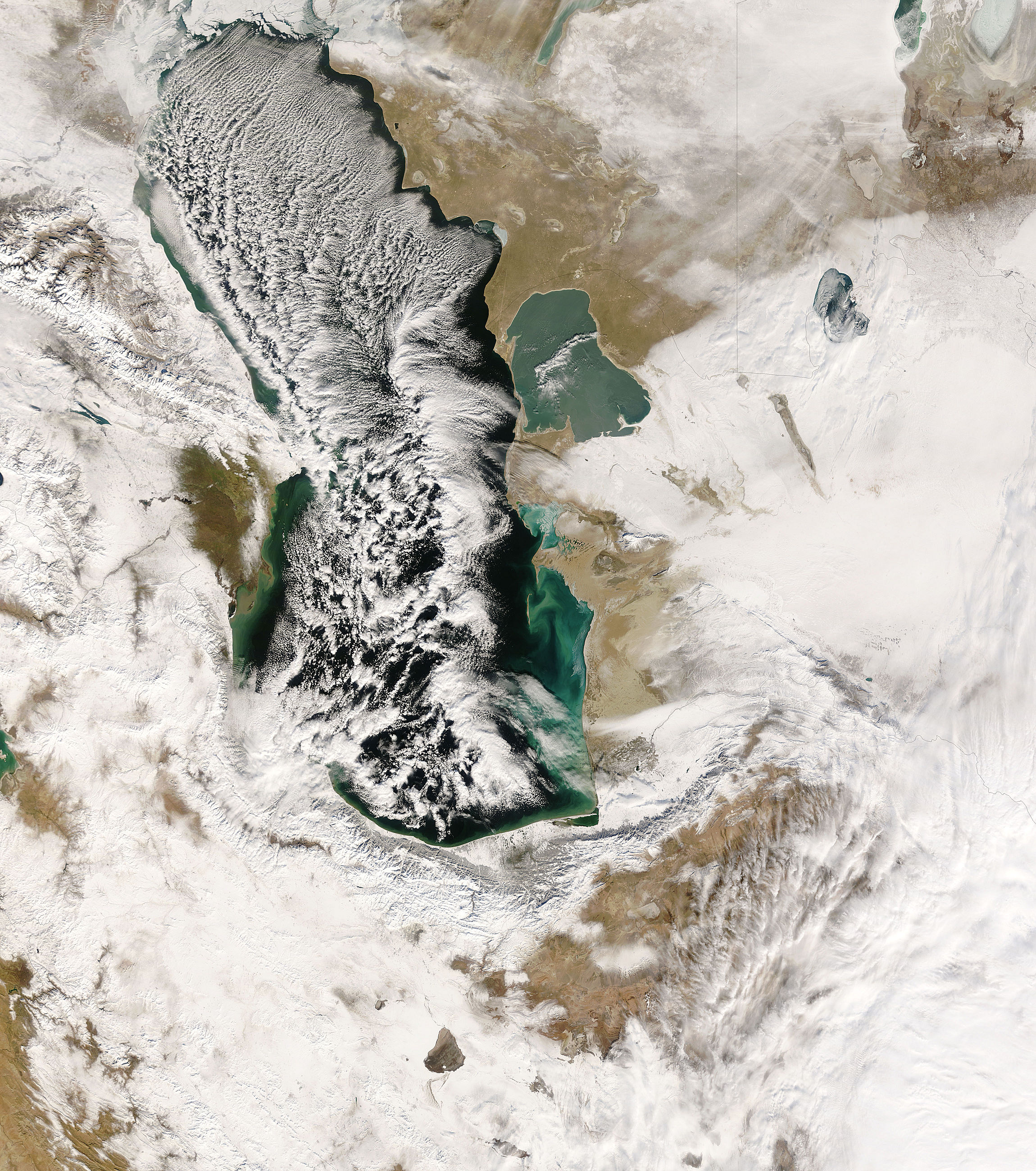
Lake-effect clouds over Caspian Sea on January 7, 2008

==== United Kingdom ====
In the United Kingdom, easterly winds bringing cold continental air across the North Sea can lead to a similar phenomenon. Locally, it is also known as "lake-effect snow" despite the snow coming in from the sea rather than a lake. Similarly during a north-westerly wind, snow showers can form coming in from the Liverpool Bay, coming down the Cheshire gap, causing snowfall in the West Midlands—this formation resulted in the white Christmas of 2004 in the area, and most recently the heavy snowfall of 8 December 2017 and 30 January 2019.

The best-known example occurred in January 1987, when record-breaking cold air (associated with an upper low) moved across the North Sea towards the UK. The result was over 2 ft of snow for coastal areas, leading to communities being cut off for over a week. The latest of these events to affect Britain's east coast occurred on November 30, 2017; February 28, 2018; and March 17, 2018; in connection with the 2018 Great Britain and Ireland cold wave. The second event of winter 2017/18 was particularly severe, with up to 27.5 inches (70 cm) falling in total over the 27th–28th.

Similarly, northerly winds blowing across the relatively warm waters of the English Channel during cold spells can bring significant snowfall to the French region of Normandy, where snow drifts exceeding 10 ft (3 m) were measured in March 2013.

Chart showing the sea-effect snow event of January 1987 in the UK: A continuous stream of showers deposited over 2 feet (24 in) of snow over SE coastal regions.

NetWeather radar image showing "lake-effect" snow over Kent and northeast England

== See also ==
- Horizontal convective rolls
- Ontario winter lake-effect systems
- Planetary boundary layer
- Sea smoke

Warnings about lake-effect snow:

United States:

- Lake effect snow advisory
- Lake effect snow watch
- Lake effect snow warning
- Severe weather terminology (United States)

Canada:

- Snowsquall warning
- Severe weather terminology (Canada)
