= Lake effect snow advisory =

Weather advisory in the United States

A lake effect snow advisory was issued by the National Weather Service of the United States when lake effect snow may pose a hazard or is life-threatening. The snow must be completely caused by a convective snow development over a lake and not by a low pressure system. The criteria for this advisory vary from area to area.

Prior to the 2008–09 winter storm season, there was the lake-effect snow and blowing snow advisory, specific for when blowing snow another hazard expected in the advised area. The Lake-Effect Snow Advisory for Lake-Effect Snow and Blowing Snow has since replaced it.

On October 2, 2017, issuance of the lake effect snow advisory has been discontinued altogether, and a winter weather advisory will now be issued when the above criteria are expected to be met.

== Examples ==
URGENT - WINTER WEATHER MESSAGE
NATIONAL WEATHER SERVICE SALT LAKE CITY UT
1136 AM MST FRI DEC 31 2010

...LAKE EFFECT SNOW TO IMPACT THE WASATCH FRONT THROUGH MIDNIGHT TONIGHT...

.A WELL DEVELOPED LAKE EFFECT SNOW BAND IS EXPECTED TO REMAIN
INTACT INTO THE OVERNIGHT HOURS TONIGHT. THE BAND IS CURRENTLY
BRINGING MODERATE TO PERIODS OF HEAVY SNOW TO THE EASTERN TOOELE
AND NORTHWESTERN SALT LAKE VALLEY AREAS THIS AFTERNOON. THIS BAND
IS EXPECTED TO HOLD TOGETHER THROUGH OR JUST AFTER MIDNIGHT
TONIGHT...GRADUALLY SHIFTING THROUGH THE SALT LAKE VALLEY LATER
THIS AFTERNOON BEFORE DISSIPATING OVER DAVIS COUNTY.

UTZ002-003-010300-
/O.NEW.KSLC.LE.Y.0002.101231T1836Z-110101T0900Z/
NORTHERN WASATCH FRONT-SALT LAKE AND TOOELE VALLEYS-
INCLUDING THE CITIES OF...BRIGHAM CITY...OGDEN...BOUNTIFUL...
SALT LAKE CITY...TOOELE
1136 AM MST FRI DEC 31 2010

...LAKE EFFECT SNOW ADVISORY IN EFFECT UNTIL 2 AM MST SATURDAY...

THE NATIONAL WEATHER SERVICE IN SALT LAKE CITY HAS ISSUED A LAKE
EFFECT SNOW ADVISORY...WHICH IS IN EFFECT UNTIL 2 AM MST
SATURDAY.

* AFFECTED AREA: THE WASATCH FRONT FROM THE TOOELE VALLEY NORTH TO
  THE INTERSTATE 84 CORRIDOR.

* SNOW ACCUMULATIONS: GENERALLY 1 TO 4 INCHES OF ADDITIONAL NEW
  SNOWFALL IS EXPECTED. THE POSSIBILITY OF UP TO 6 INCHES EXISTS
  IN NORTHWESTERN SALT LAKE AND NORTHEASTERN TOOELE VALLEYS.

* TIMING: THE LAKE BAND IS EXPECTED TO BE OVER NORTHEASTERN TOOELE
  AND NORTHWESTERN SALT LAKE COUNTY AREAS THROUGH THIS AFTERNOON.
  THE BAND IS EXPECTED TO SHIFT INTO THE SALT LAKE METRO AREA LATE
  THIS AFTERNOON AND EVENING BEFORE SHIFTING NORTH INTO DAVIS
  COUNTY. THE BAND IS EXPECTED TO DISSIPATE OVER DAVIS COUNTY
  AROUND THE MIDDLE OF THE NIGHT.

* IMPACTS: DRIVING CONDITIONS ARE EXPECTED TO DETERIORATE RAPIDLY
  FOR AREAS AFFECTED BY THIS LAKE EFFECT BAND. SNOWPACKED AND ICY
  ROADS ARE LIKELY...AS WELL AS REDUCED VISIBILITIES BELOW 1/2
  MILE DURING MODERATE TO AT TIMES BRIEF HEAVY SNOWFALL.

PRECAUTIONARY/PREPAREDNESS ACTIONS...

A LAKE EFFECT SNOW ADVISORY MEANS LAKE-EFFECT SNOW SHOWERS ARE
EXPECTED OR OCCURRING AND TRAVEL WILL BE DIFFICULT IN SOME AREAS.
LAKE-EFFECT SNOW SHOWERS TYPICALLY ALIGN THEMSELVES IN BANDS AND
WILL LIKELY BE INTENSE ENOUGH TO PRODUCE SEVERAL INCHES IN
LOCALIZED AREAS WITH SUDDEN RESTRICTIONS IN VISIBILITY. USE
CAUTION WHEN TRAVELING.

FOR WINTER ROAD CONDITIONS FROM THE UTAH DEPARTMENT OF
TRANSPORTATION VISIT...HTTP://WWW.COMMUTERLINK.UTAH.GOV OR DIAL
511.

&&

$$

FOR MORE INFORMATION FROM NOAA/S NATIONAL WEATHER SERVICE VISIT...
HTTP://WEATHER.GOV/SALTLAKECITY (ALL LOWER CASE)

== See also ==
- Lake effect snow warning
- Severe weather terminology (United States)
