= Okama Crater Lake =

Lake in Japan

Coordinates: 38°08′11″N 140°26′58″E

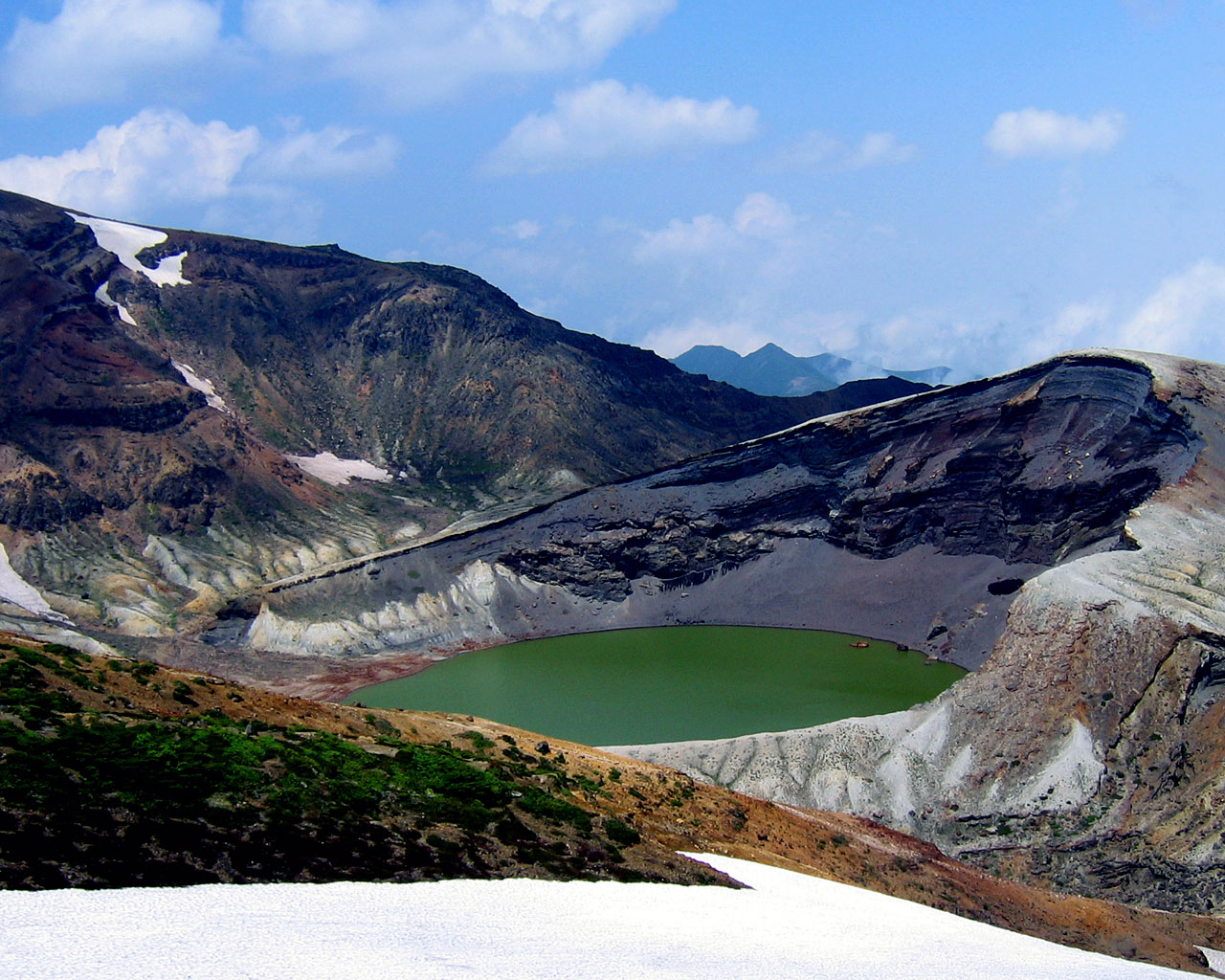
Okama Crater Lake on Mount Zaō, Miyagi, Japan

Okama (Japanese: 御釜), meaning an honourable cauldron, is the inactive volcanic crater (crater lake) on top of Mount Zaō, located in Kawasaki, Miyagi, on the border with Yamagata, Japan. While local people call it affectionately Okama, the visitors tend to call it Goshiki-numa (五色沼), meaning "Five Color Pond", because its color changes depending on the time of the day, the weather, or the season of the year.

Okama Crater Lake is situated at the height of about 1600 meters above sea level. According to the 1968 survey, its east–west and north–south diameters are both 325 meters, and maximum depth is 27.6 meters.

== Gallery ==
Okama Crater Lake Viewed from the North, West and South on the Volcanic Rim:
Viewed from the northern Umanose (馬の背), in October.	Viewed from the western Umanose, in August.	Viewed from the southern Karita Peak (刈田岳), in April.

== Access ==
Okama Crater Lake can be reached from Yamagata or Miyagi, Japan on the Zaō Echo Line part of Yamagata-Miyagi Prefectural Route 12 (宮城県道・山形県道12号白石上山線).

== See also ==
- Goshiki-numa - A cluster of volcanic lakes of the Bandai Highland (磐梯高原) in Kitashiobara, Fukushima, Japan.
