= Lake effect snow warning =

Type of weather warning

A lake effect snow warning is a bulletin issued by the National Weather Service in the United States to warn of heavy snowfall accumulations that are imminent from convective snow generated by very cold airmass passing over unfrozen lakes (lake effect snow). The criteria for amounts may vary significantly over different county warning areas. On October 2, 2017, some National Weather Service Forecast Offices discontinued issuing the Lake Effect Snow Warning, and consolidated it with the Winter Storm Warning. On October 15, 2018, the National Weather Service discontinued issuing Lake Effect Snow Warnings nationwide all together, and all offices consolidated it with the Winter Storm Warning. Lake effect snow warnings were reinstated for the 2019–20 winter season.

Environment Canada's Meteorological Service of Canada issues similar warnings but they are called snowsquall warnings.

== Examples ==
879 
WWUS41 KBUF 171935
WSWBUF

URGENT - WINTER WEATHER MESSAGE
National Weather Service Buffalo NY
235 PM EST Tue Dec 17 2019

NYZ006-180345-
/O.NEW.KBUF.LE.W.0001.191218T1400Z-191219T0000Z/
Oswego-
Including the city of Oswego
235 PM EST Tue Dec 17 2019

...LAKE EFFECT SNOW WARNING IN EFFECT FROM 9 AM TO 7 PM EST
WEDNESDAY...

* WHAT...Heavy lake effect snow expected. Total snow accumulations
  of 6 to 10 inches in the most persistent lake snows. Winds
  gusting as high as 35 mph will produce blowing and drifting
  snow. Snowfall rates may briefly reach 2 to 4 inches per hour.

* WHERE...Oswego county. Greatest accumulations across the Tug
  Hill Plateau, with much lower amounts across lower elevations.

* WHEN...From 9 AM to 7 PM EST Wednesday.

* IMPACTS...Travel will be very difficult with deep snow cover on
  roads and very poor visibility. The hazardous conditions could
  impact the evening commute.

PRECAUTIONARY/PREPAREDNESS ACTIONS...

Heavy snow will fall in relatively narrow bands. If traveling, be
prepared for rapidly changing road conditions and visibilities.

Submit snow reports through our website or social media.

&&

Experimental content below...do not use operationally
Please see below links for more information on this experiment
http://www.weather.gov/buf/polygon_pdd
http://www.nws.noaa.gov/os/notification/
pns15lake_effect_snowaaa.htm
To view the experimental polygons please see:
http://www.weather.gov/buf/lespolygon
COORD...4408 7515 4417 7534 4406 7579 4391 7615 
        4383 7623 4348 7623 4346 7561 4353 7548 4371 7531 
        4373 7513 
TIME Y19M12D18T1400Z-Y19M12D18T2000Z
COORD...4340 7586 4346 7581 4352 7644 4347 7659 
        4339 7661 4330 7645 4328 7645 4326 7622 4328 7620 
        4322 7587 
TIME Y19M12D18T2000Z-Y19M12D19T0000Z

&&

$$

Hitchcock

== See also ==
- Severe weather terminology (United States)
- Lake effect snow advisory
- Snowsquall
