= Lake-effect rain =

Weather phenomenon

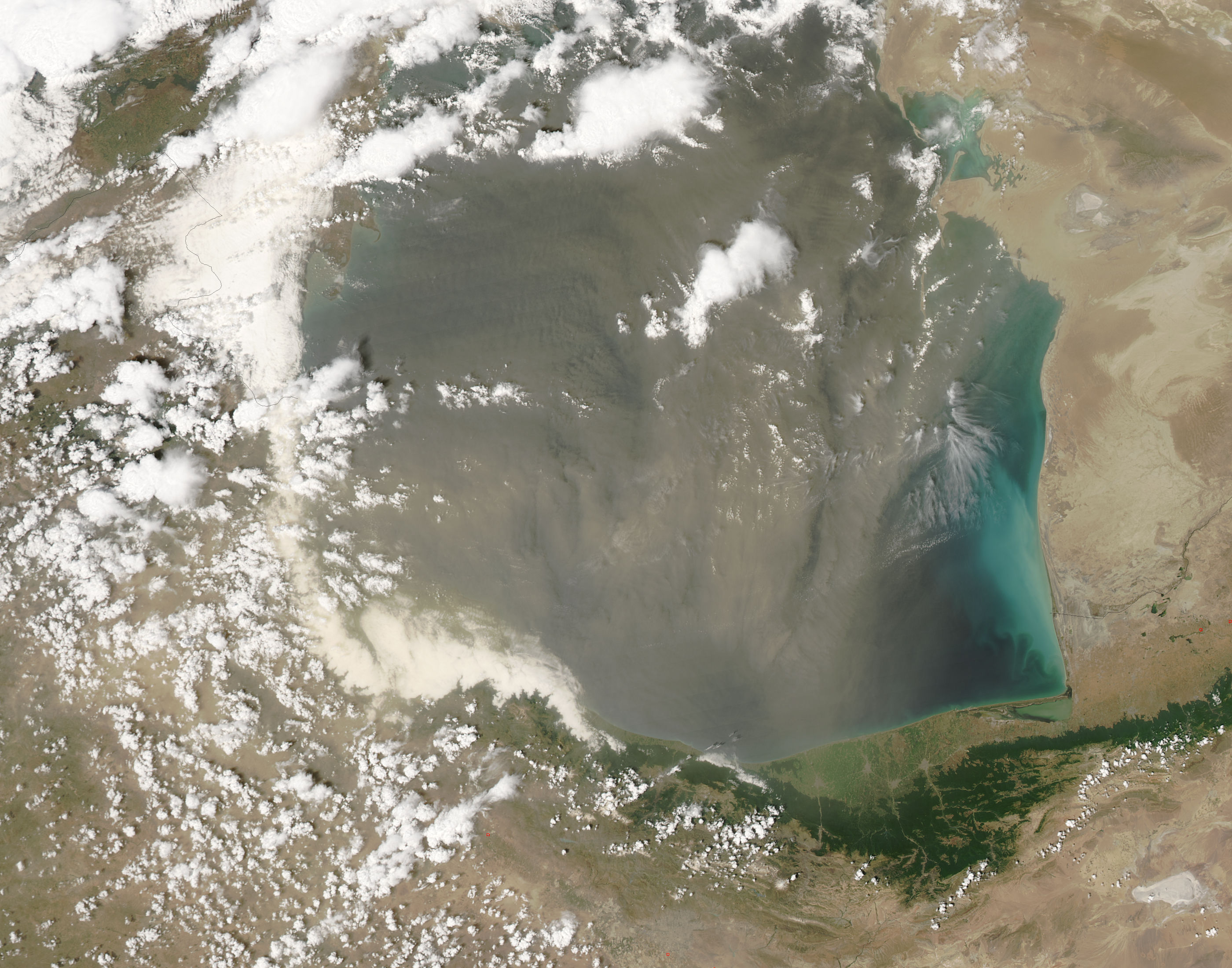
Lake-effect rain clouds over the Iranian Caspian coast (June 2016)

Lake-effect rain, or bay-effect rain, is the liquid equivalent of lake-effect snow, where the rising air results in a transfer of warm air and moisture from a lake into the predominant colder air, resulting in a fast buildup of clouds and rainfall downwind of the lake. If the air temperature is not low enough to keep the precipitation frozen, it falls as a lake-effect rain. In order for lake-effect rain to form, the air moving across the lake must be significantly cooler than the air over the water surface.

The resulting rain bands can accumulate to cause localized flash flooding, thunder, lightning and even waterspouts in extreme events. Although the effect is associated with the North American Great Lakes, it can occur downwind of any large lake that can hold its summer heat well into the cooler days of autumn and early winter. Another similar effect is sea-effect or ocean-effect rain, which is caused by three primary components: a cold air mass over land, warm ocean water, and enough wind from the right direction.

== Formation ==
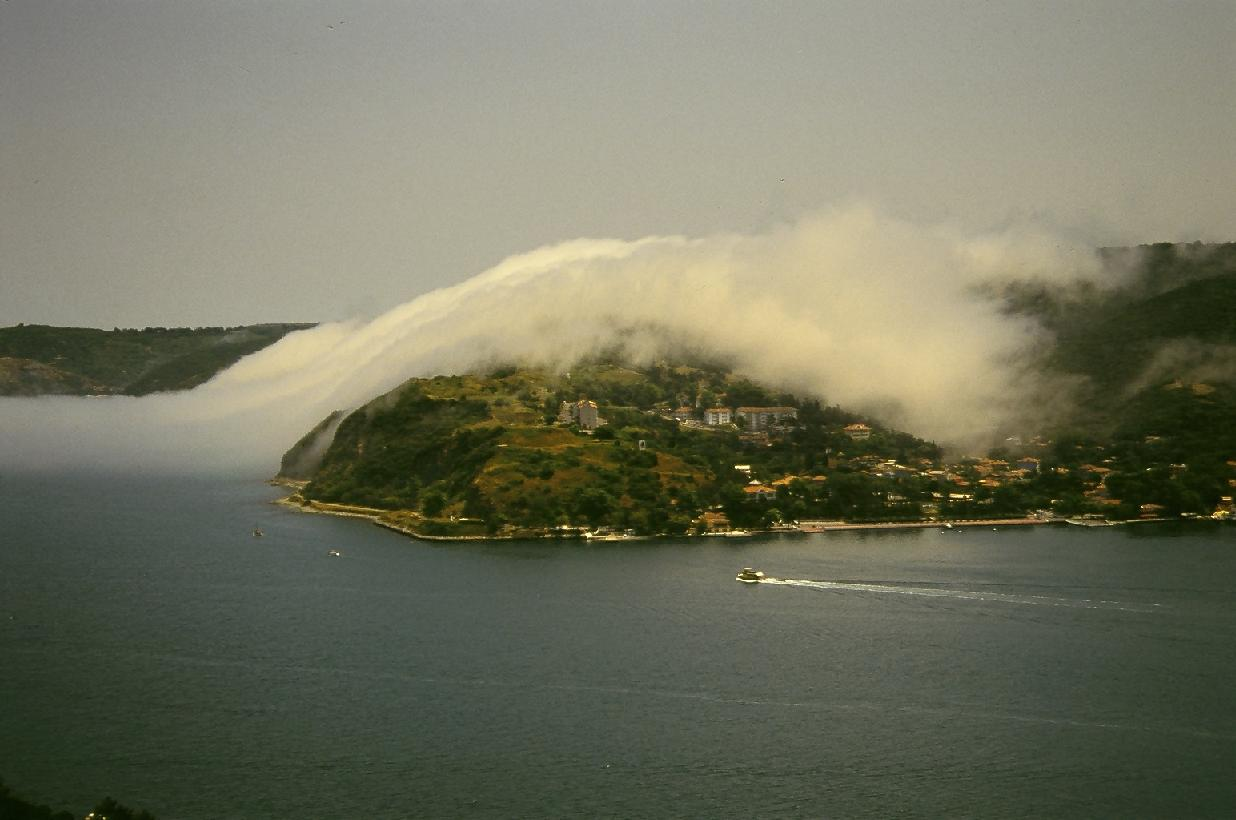
Lake-effect clouds forming over the Bosporus, Beykoz, Turkey

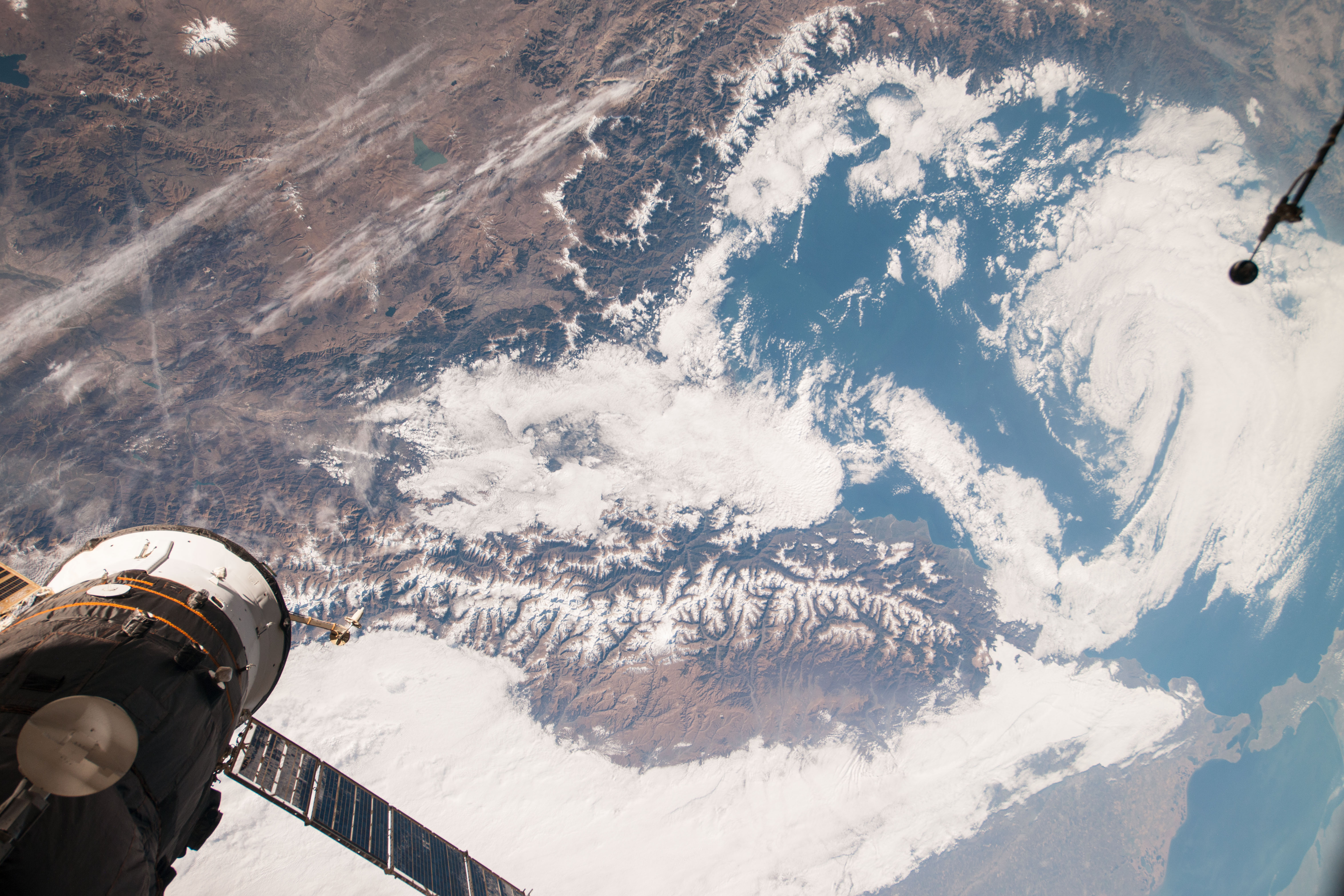
Lake-effect cloud formation over the Black Sea coast of Turkey (top-centre)

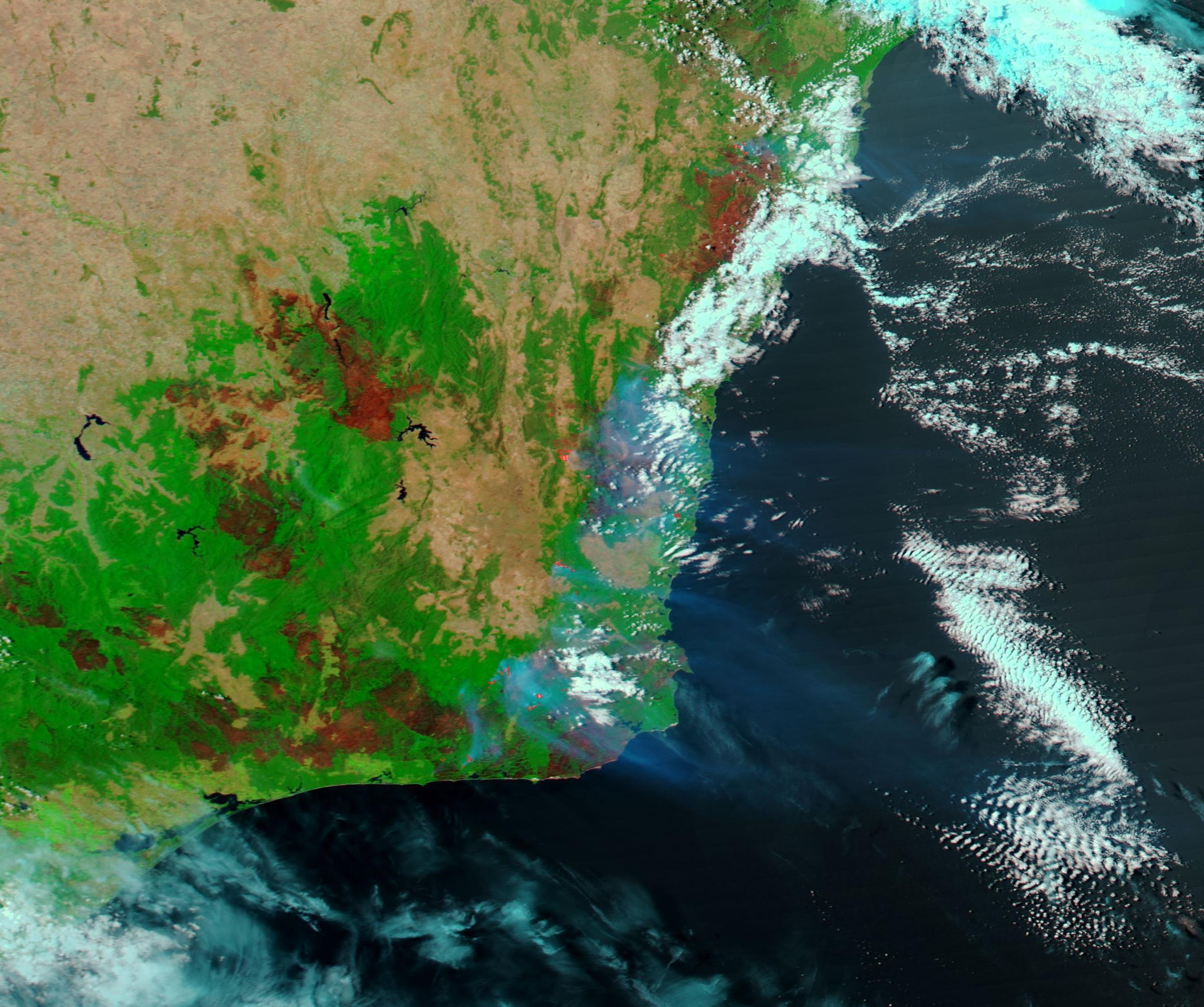
Sea-effect clouds over Sydney and Central Coast, Australia

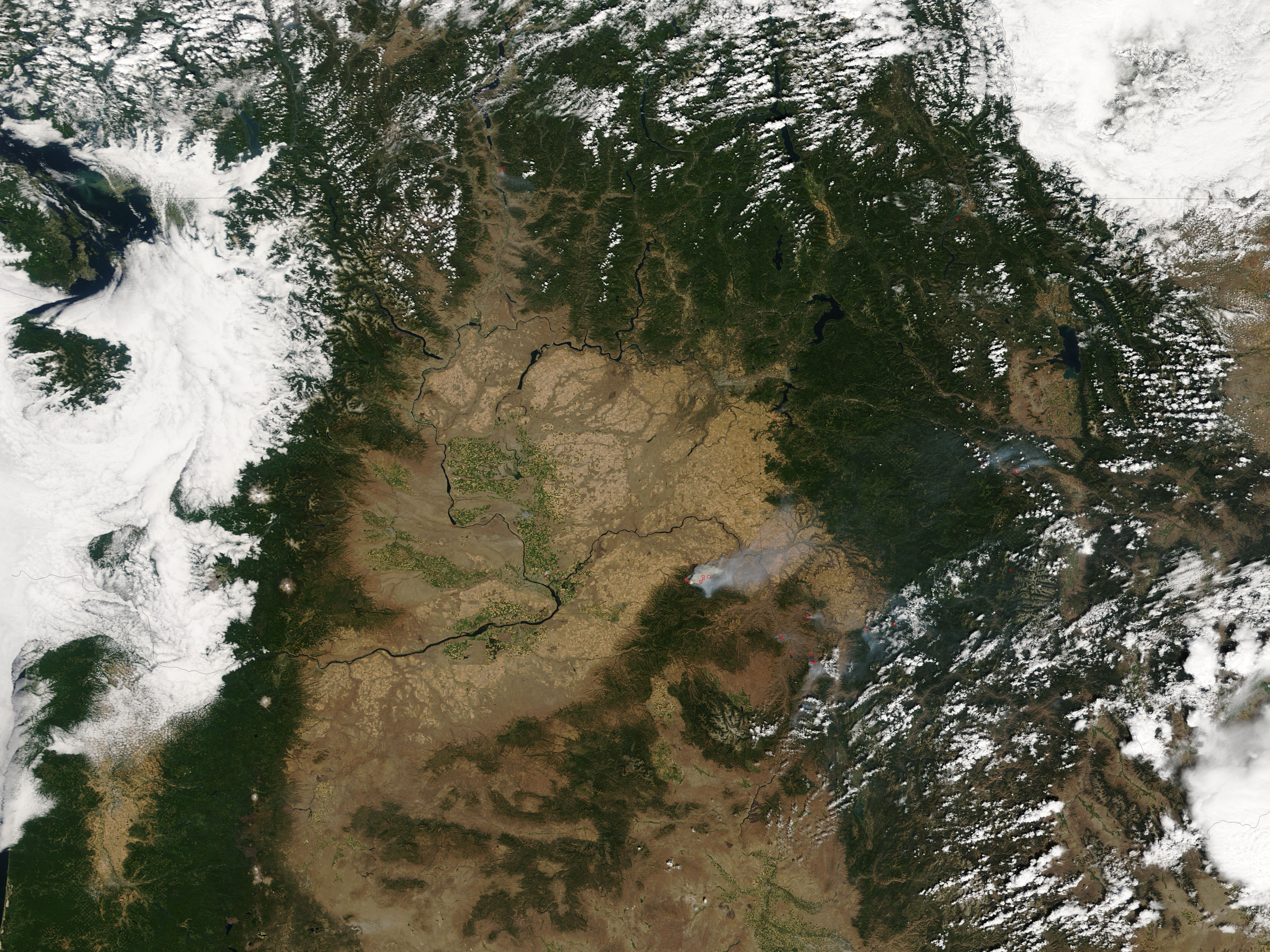
Sea-effect clouds from the Salish Sea over Seattle and eastern Washington

Lake-effect rain forms in a similar way to lake-effect snow: cold air moves across the relatively warmer waters of lakes, thereby creating a sharp drop in temperature from the lake surface through the first several thousand feet in the atmosphere (the temperature gradient is known as the "lapse rate"), and then it precipitates the moisture over the lake or on the downwind shore, depending on the amount of cold air and the lift. The lake effect phenomena is observed in the proximate vicinity of a lake or a sea, where the conditions are appropriate for rain formation (since the water is warmer than the air mass above it), thereby increasing instability. Consequentially, the air over the water's surface is heated and this leads to showers developing. Furthermore, rain showers generally develop over a waterbody in autumn to early winter due to the higher water temperature compared to the air above.

Only when the lake water is cooler than the air temperature, cloud development is hindered. The only difference compared to the lake-snow effect is that the water and air temperatures are several degrees warmer. The air is still cold enough to carry on the process, but warm enough in the lower layers for the precipitation reaches the ground as rain rather than snowfall. The boundary layer's temperature must be higher than 0 °C (32 °F) through an adequate depth to melt the snow to liquid precipitation. Generally, a temperature difference of 10 °C (18 °F) between the air at around 850 millibars pressure and a waterbody can cause a lake effect.

After a cold front arrives, the temperature at elevated areas decreases substantially, ensuing in significant atmospheric instability over the placid mild lakes. Waterspouts can develop if there is a severe temperature gradient in the downwind zone. A study of lake-effect rainfall for Lake Erie by Pennsylvania State University meteorologists Todd J. Miner and J. M. Fritsch found out that, unlike many lake-effect snow events, the conditionally unstable layer for lake-effect rain events was denser, thereby permitting higher convective activity and frequent thunderstorms. That is why lake-effect days with thunder along Lake Erie occur most frequently from late September to mid-October (since the sheet of unstable air is deeper).

=== Sea-effect rain ===
Sea-effect rain does not need a storm system or an area of low pressure to form (much like lake-effect snow). In the northeastern United States for instance, the effect requires a northeast wind direction for many events, which allows the air flow to pull in the milder air from the ocean towards the land. When the wind moves inland, the cooler, heavy air mass over a landform acts as a lifting medium. The relatively warmer, lighter air arriving from the ocean is forced up, leading over the cold pool, where it cools down and condenses, forming clouds and precipitation (from rain shower to snowfall) on the coastline. As the bands move inland, they gradually diminish as the energy and moisture source dissipates.

The quantity of condensation that develops is determined by the vertical temperature gradient between sea level and an altitude of around 5,000 feet (1,500 m). The gradient plays a critical role in the arrangement of clouds and precipitation (since it impacts the amount of water vapor that is carried aloft). A sharper gradient can lead to higher condensation and more intense precipitation, whereas a shallower gradient can result in both minor condensation and precipitation.

== Occurrence ==
- In the United States, lake-effect rain showers first begin to form in September through to November east of Lake Erie; from then on, virtually all lake-effect precipitation falls as snow. In the seven years studied in the 1990s regarding areas downwind of Lake Erie, a total of 32 lake-effect rain events were counted.
- In the Pacific Northwest, the Olympic Peninsula's western side and the western slopes of the Cascade Range receive as much as 160 inches (4,100 mm) of precipitation annually due to the "ocean-effect rain". The ranges cause an orographic lift of the air masses blown inland from the Pacific Ocean, resulting in the windward side of the mountains receiving high levels of precipitation. The Puget Sound lowlands are known for clouds and rain in the winter.
- In Australia, Port Phillip Bay is often warmer than the surrounding oceans and/or the land mass, generally in spring and autumn; this can set up a "bay effect", where showers are intensified leeward of the bay (particularly in Melbourne's eastern suburbs like Mornington) with relatively narrow streams of heavy showers affecting the same places for an extended period. Meanwhile, the rest of Melbourne (to the north) and other leeward areas (west of the bay) such as Geelong remain dry.
- The Caspian Sea causes a year-round high evaporation and a rainfall increase in autumn and winter in the southwestern coastline (Gilan province and the western side of Babolsar County in Iran, and Lankaran-Astara Economic Region in Azerbaijan), where over half of the over-lake rainfall is ascribable to the lake effect.
- In the Black Sea coast, lake-effect rainfall occurs in Istanbul, Rize, Giresun, Trabzon and Samsun, among other areas on the northern coastline of Turkey.
- The lake-effect rain occurs often on Lake Geneva and Lake Constance in Switzerland, with affected areas being Lavaux, Montreux, Villeneuve and Port-Valais. In rare circumstances, northeasterly winds in the Geneva region may set up the lake effect there.

== See also ==
- Great Salt Lake effect
- Foehn effect
- Rain shadow
