= Snow country (Japan) =

Areas in Japan characterized by heavy, long-lasting snowfall

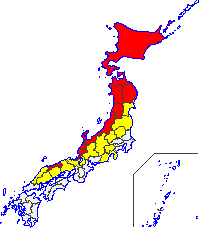
Map showing Japan's “snow country”. Red indicates prefectures completely inside it; yellow, prefectures partially in it.

Snow country (雪国, yukiguni; also, more formally, gōsetsu chitai (豪雪地帯; "heavy snowfall zone")) refers to areas in Japan characterized by heavy, long-lasting snowfalls.

The rather poetic snow country (雪国, yukiguni) can refer to any place with heavy or deep snows and is generally understood as a reference to the Sea of Japan side of Honshū (Japan's main island) and the area encompassed by the Japanese Alps, a series of mountain ranges that make up the island's backbone. In its broadest meaning, snow country means the belt along the Sea of Japan from Yamaguchi (in particular, Shimane) in the south to Honshū's northern tip, as well as Sado Island and Hokkaidō. More narrowly defined, it is used to indicate the area from Fukui to Akita Prefecture, but it is most closely associated with part of Fukui and all of Toyama and Niigata Prefectures.

"Heavy Snowfall Zones" refers to places where snowfall and snow cover are severe enough to be a hindrance to the livelihood of inhabitants or the development of local industry. In all, more than half of Japan's land area carries the designation—ten complete prefectures and portions of fourteen others out of Japan's 47 prefectures. Heavy snow areas are eligible for subsidies and other special consideration from the central government to help them cope with the snow (such as for snow removal) and otherwise bring stability to local livelihoods and economies.

The heavy snowfalls of Japan's snow country are caused by moisture-laden clouds bumping up against the mountains along the backbone of Honshū and releasing their moisture under the influence of westerly winds blowing off the continent or down from Siberia. As a result, the region includes some of the world's snowiest spots at the same latitudes, many localities are also frequently visited by avalanches.

In some places, snow is frequently so deep that buildings have a special entrance on their second story. Likewise, roads must be excavated out of the snow with walls building up as high as 17 meters (56 ft).

People must remove snow from their roofs to prevent its weight from crushing their homes, and special care is taken to protect trees from the snow's weight. In some towns, people used to tunnel paths to one another's homes, and streets were lined with covered sidewalks to ensure that people could get around. Today in areas where temperatures are high enough to make it practical, many roads are equipped with sprinklers using warm ground water to keep them passable by melting the snow.

The most recent record snows were brought by the blizzards of December 2005–February 2006, when well over 3 m (4.5 m in one part of Aomori Prefecture) of snow accumulated in many rural areas, and anywhere from 46 cm (Tottori) to nearly 1.5 m (Aomori) piled up even in several major cities.

In February 2025, 47.24 inches (120.0 cm) of snow fell in Obihiro, Hokkaido in just 12 hours, one of the fastest recorded anywhere.

One striking feature of Japan's snow country are the snow monsters (樹氷, Juhyō) on Mount Zaō (蔵王山, Zaō-san). Strong winds over the nearby lake fling water droplets which freeze against the trees and their branches, until near-horizontal icicles begin to form. Falling snow settles on the ice formations, and the result is a grotesque figure of a tree. The effect of a full forest of such trees gives visitors a ghostly impression.

== Gallery ==
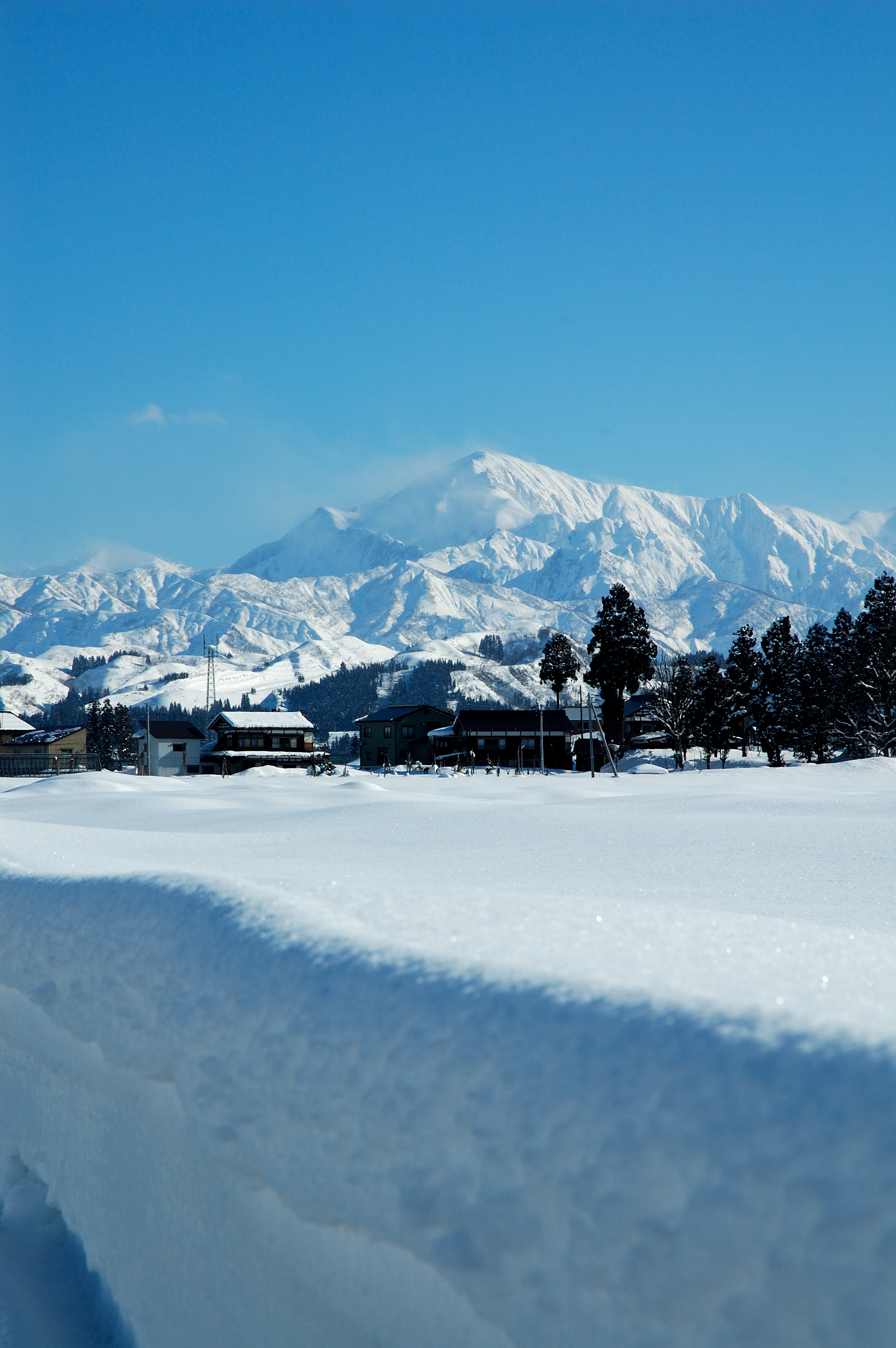
A yukiguni landscape in the Niigata Prefecture

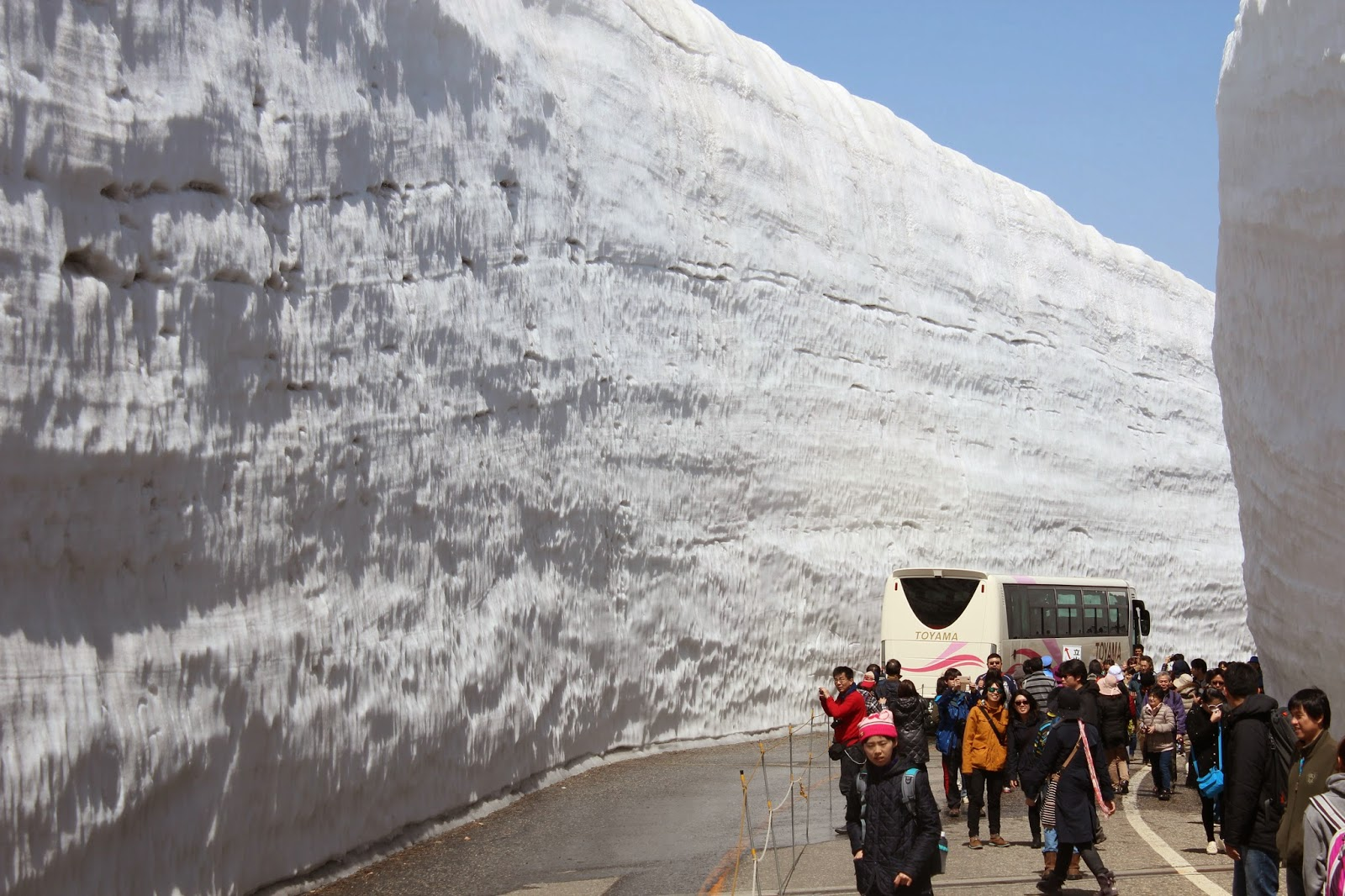
A snow wall on the Tateyama Kurobe Alpine Route (Toyama)

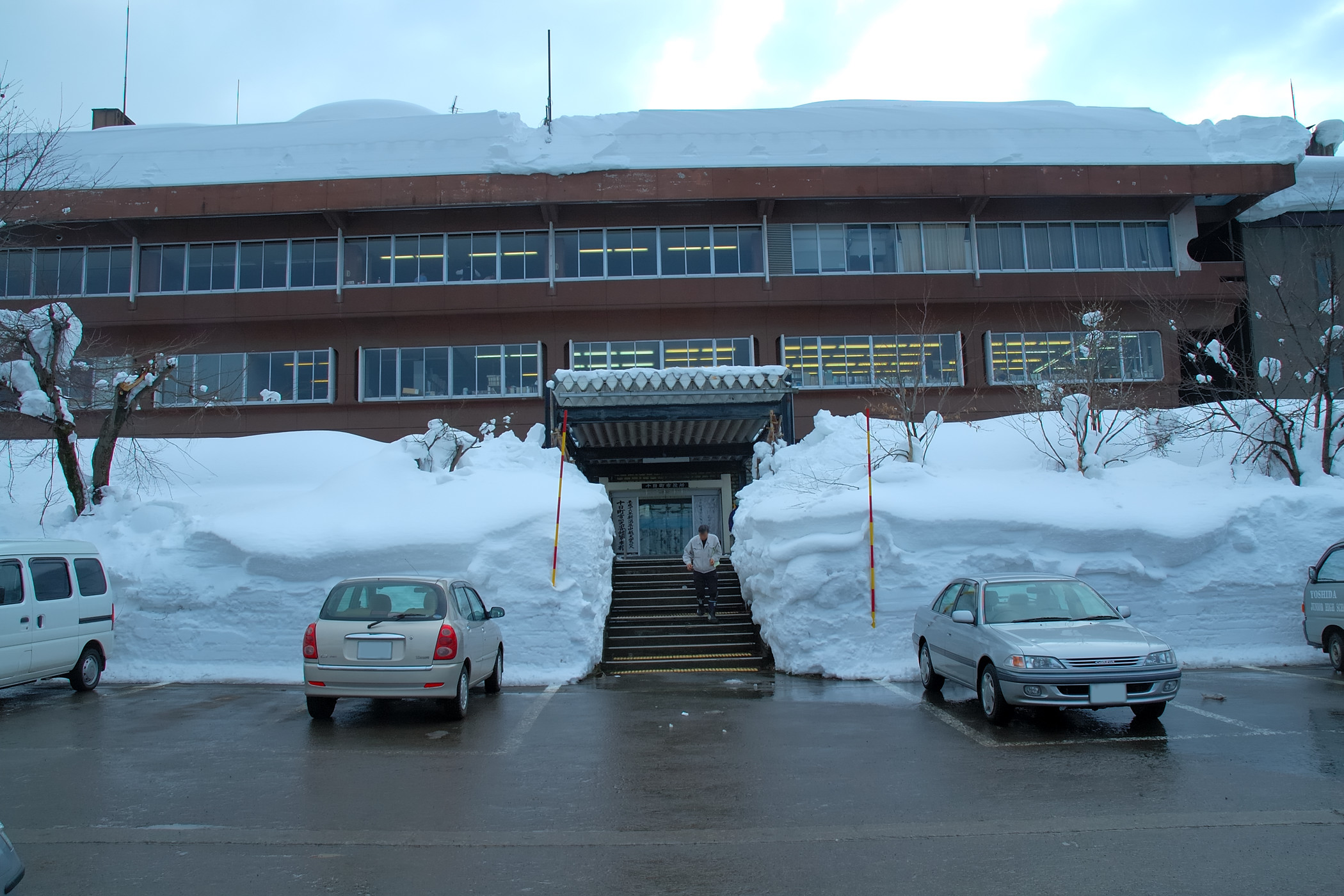
Tōkamachi (Niigata) city hall in January 2006

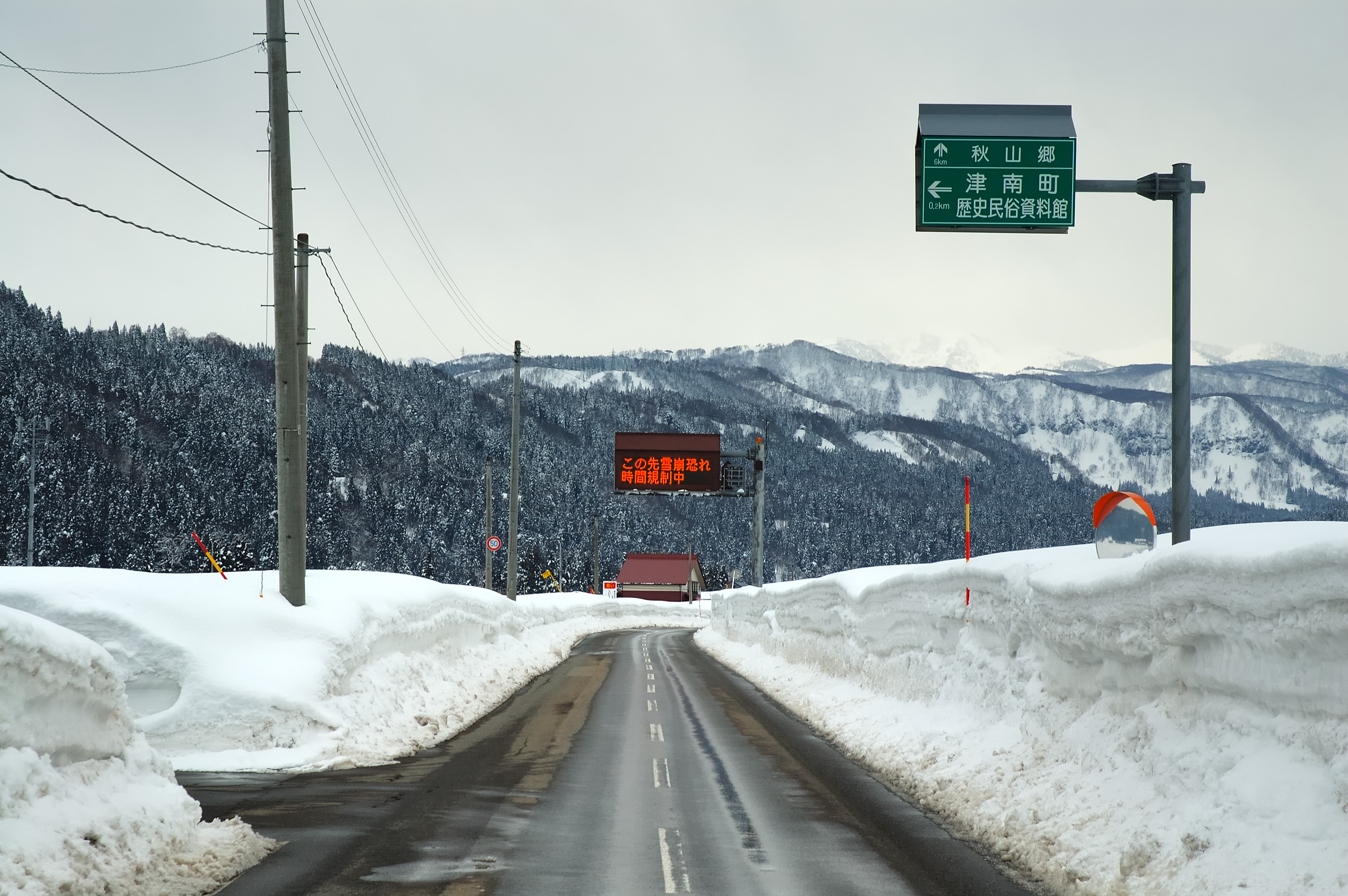
Electronic sign warns of avalanche danger near Tsunan, Niigata

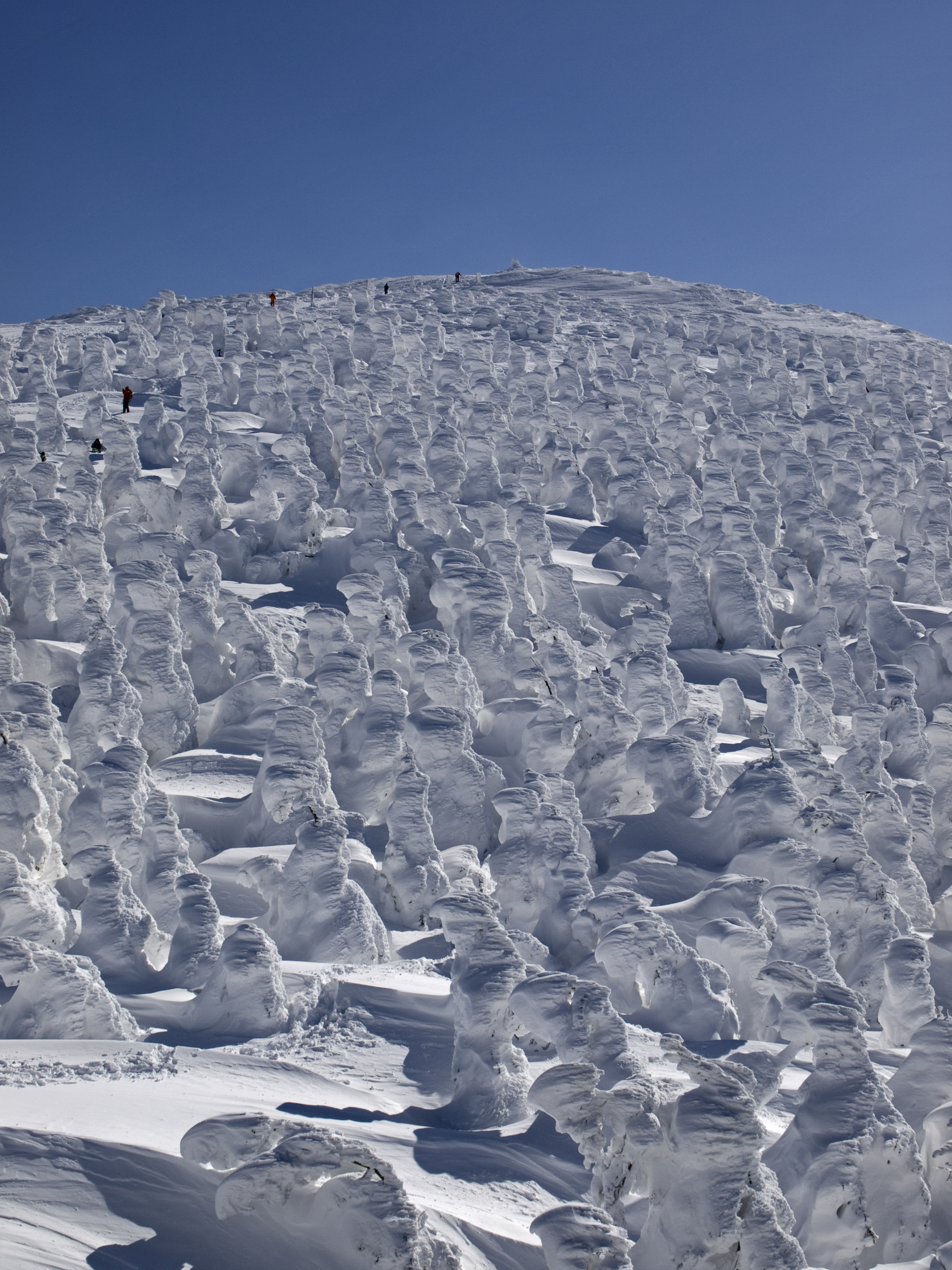
Snow monsters in Mount Zaō

== See also ==
- Mount Zaō
- Snow Country, a novel set in the Niigata Prefecture
- 1998 Winter Olympics, which took place in the Snow Country, in particular Nagano
- Matagi
