= Canadian Land Surface Scheme =

The Canadian Land Surface Scheme (CLASS) is a land surface parametrization scheme for use in large scale climate models. It is a state-of-the-art model, using physically based equations to simulate the energy and water balances of vegetation, snow and soil. CLASS is being developed in a research project led by D. Verseghy at the Canadian Atmospheric Environment Service.

== See also ==
- CCCma - CLASS is used in CGCM3.1
