= JULES =

Climate and weather model

JULES (Joint UK Land Environment Simulator) is a land-surface parameterisation model scheme describing soil-vegetation-atmosphere interactions. JULES is a community led project which evolved from MOSES, the United Kingdom Meteorological Office (Met Office) Surface Exchange Scheme. It can be used as a stand-alone model or as the land surface part of the Met Office Unified Model. JULES has been used to help decide what tactics would be effective to help meet the goals of the Paris Agreement. As well as use by the Met Office climate modelling group a number of studies have cited JULES and used it as a tool to assess the effects of climate change, and to simulate environmental factors from groundwater to carbon in the atmosphere.

JULES has been described as the most accurate global carbon budget model of net ecosystem productivity, because it has more years of data than other models.
