= Land surface models (climate) =

Land surface models (LSMs) use quantitative methods to simulate the exchange of water and energy fluxes at the Earth surface–atmosphere interface. They are key component of climate models. Over the past two decades, they have evolved from oversimplified schemes, which described the surface boundary conditions for general circulation models (GCMs), to complex models that can be used alone or as part of GCMs to investigate the biogeochemical, hydrological, and energy cycles at the Earth's surface.

It has been suggested that "terrestrial biosphere models" (TBMs) is a more inclusive term than land surface models (LSMs). The representation of roots in TBMs (or LSMs), however, remains relatively crude. Particularly, the dynamic functions of roots and phylogenetic basis of water uptake remain largely absent in LSMs.

== See also ==
- CLASS
- JULES
- NCAR LSM 1.0
