= January 1961 nor'easter =

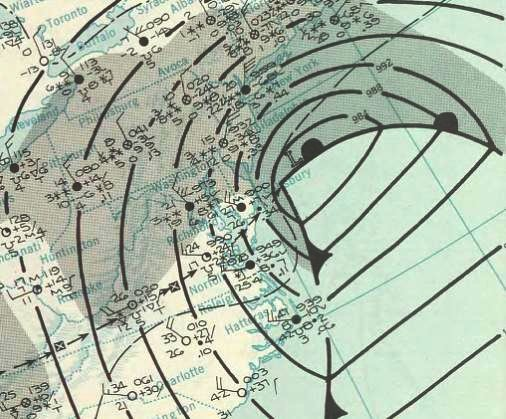
- A surface weather analysis of the intensifying nor'easter on January 20: click to enlarge

Meteorological history
- Formed: January 18, 1961
- Dissipated: January 21, 1961

Category 2 "Minor" winter storm
- Regional snowfall index: 3.91 (NOAA)
- Lowest pressure: 964 mbar (hPa); 28.47 inHg
- Maximum snowfall or ice accretion: 27 inches (69 cm)

Overall effects
- Fatalities: 28
- Areas affected: Midwestern United States, Mid-Atlantic states, New England

From January 18–21, 1961 a significant nor'easter sometimes referred to as the Kennedy Inaugural Snowstorm since it struck on the eve of the inauguration of John F. Kennedy, impacted the Mid-Atlantic and New England regions of the United States. It was the second of three major snowstorms during the 1960–1961 winter. The storm ranked as Category 3, or "major", on the Northeast Snowfall Impact Scale.

== Meteorological history ==
The storm was preceded by a cold front that brought cold air, associated with an area of high pressure north of the Great Lakes, into the area. The low pressure system quickly moved towards the East Coast on January 19 from the southern United States. Its track was unusually far north, passing through the mid-Ohio Valley. The low tracked from Tennessee to the southern Appalachian Mountains, and moved off the coast of Virginia. It rapidly strengthened; from 0000 UTC to 1200 UTC on January 20, it intensified from 996 millibars to 972 mb. The storm's intensification was accompanied by an increase in the precipitation. It ultimately moved northeastward along the coast and reached its lowest barometric pressure of 964 mb late on January 20, while situated east of New England.

Widespread heavy snow fell from West Virginia and Virginia through Massachusetts and southern New Hampshire, with lighter amounts spreading into Maine. Totals of over 20 in (51 cm) were recorded from eastern Pennsylvania through central New England. Snowfall amounts were similar to that of a winter storm in February 1958. Following the storm, an anticyclone in the central United States maintained the cold air.

== Impact ==
In advance of the storm, the Weather Bureau predicted a mix of rain and snow in Washington, D.C., but instead, the precipitation remained frozen. The unexpected snowfall resulted in chaos, and thousands of cars were marooned or abandoned, triggering massive traffic jams. According to the U.S. Army Corps of Engineers, "The Engineers teamed up with more than 1,000 District of Columbia employees to clear the inaugural parade route. Luckily much equipment and some men had been pre-positioned and were ready to go. In the end the task force employed hundreds of dump trucks, front-end loaders, sanders, plows, rotaries, and flamethrowers to clear the way." The snowstorm prevented former President Herbert Hoover from flying into Washington National Airport and attending Kennedy's swearing-in ceremony. Additionally, the storm dealt the final blow to the Texas Tower #4, a USAF radar installation in the Atlantic Ocean, causing her to sink with the loss of all 28 crew aboard.

== See also ==
- Climate of the United States
- List of NESIS storms
