= February 1995 nor'easter =

Significant extratropical cyclone

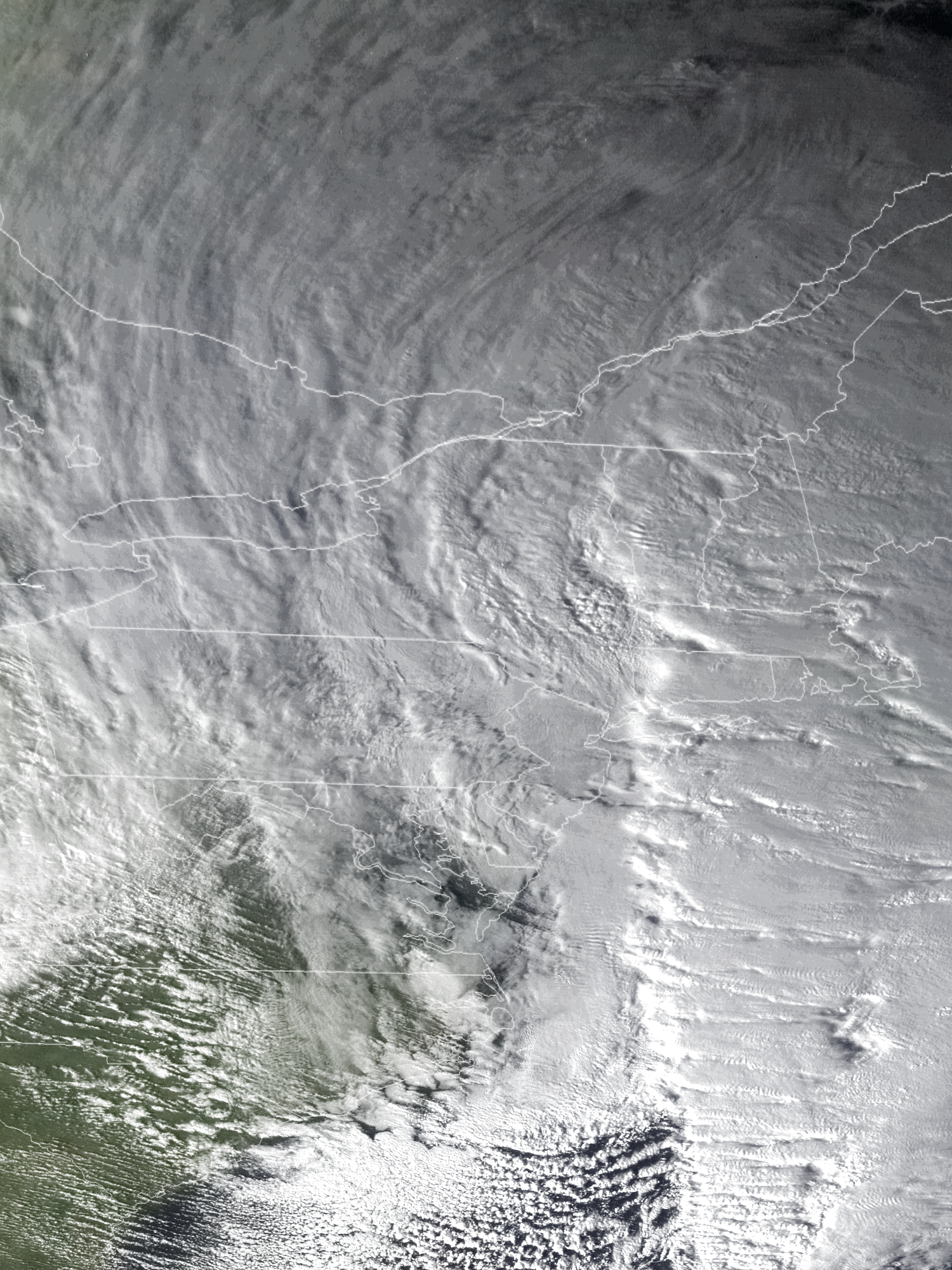
- Satellite imagery of the nor'easter rapidly intensifying on February 4

Meteorological history
- Formed: February 2, 1995
- Dissipated: February 6, 1995

Category 2 "Minor" winter storm
- Regional snowfall index: 4.28 (NOAA)
- Highest winds: 75 mph (120 km/h)
- Lowest pressure: 962 mbar (28.4 inHg)

The February 1995 nor'easter was a significant nor'easter that impacted the Mid-Atlantic and New England regions of the United States around the beginning of the month. It was the only major nor'easter of the 1994–1995 winter.

== Synoptic history ==
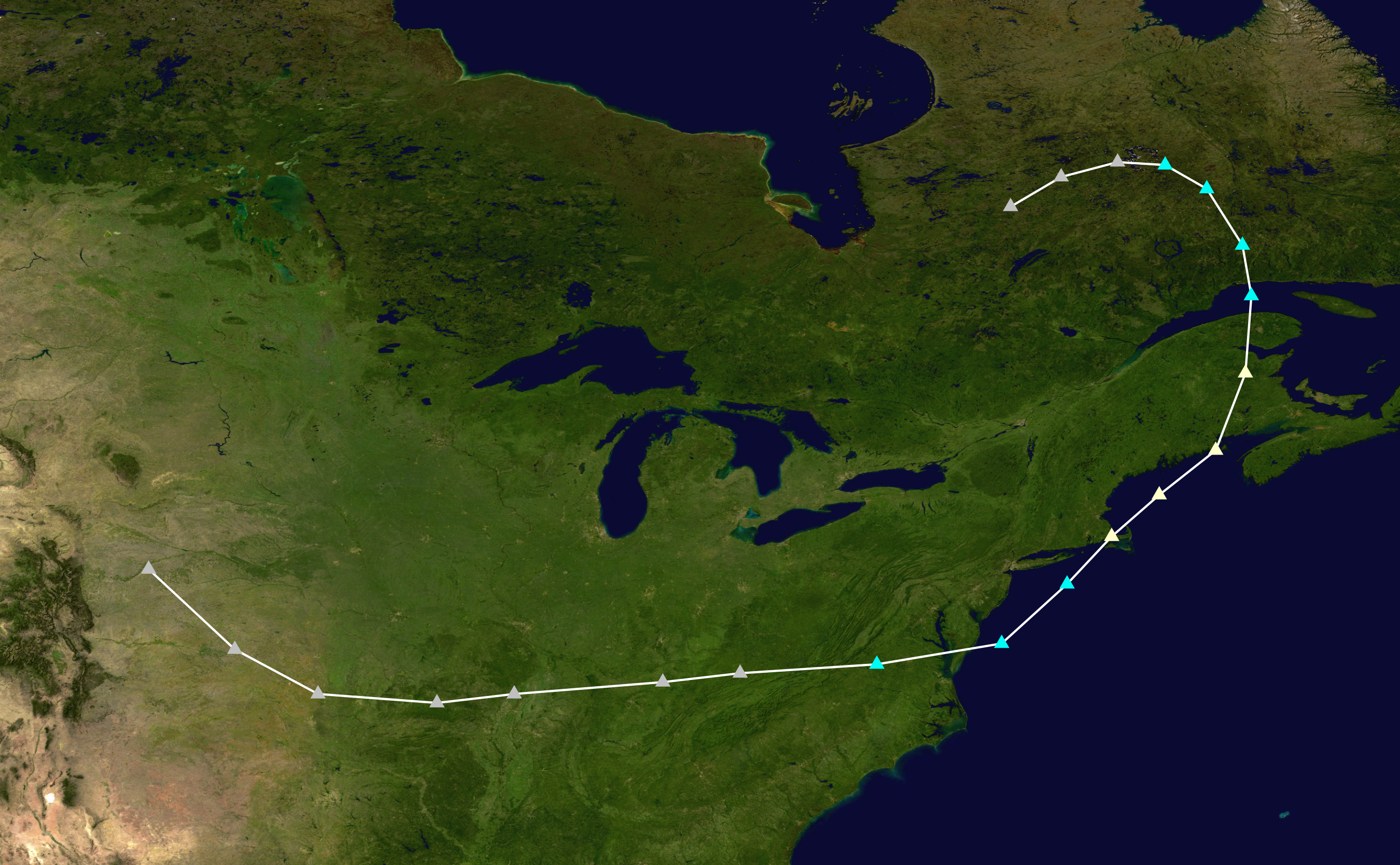
Map plotting the storm's track and intensity, according to the Saffir–Simpson scale Map key Saffir–Simpson scale Tropical depression (≤38 mph, ≤62 km/h) Tropical storm (39–73 mph, 63–118 km/h) Category 1 (74–95 mph, 119–153 km/h) Category 2 (96–110 mph, 154–177 km/h) Category 3 (111–129 mph, 178–208 km/h) Category 4 (130–156 mph, 209–251 km/h) Category 5 (≥157 mph, ≥252 km/h) Unknown Storm type Tropical cyclone Subtropical cyclone Extratropical cyclone, remnant low, tropical disturbance, or monsoon depression

The initial low pressure area tracked eastward from the southern Great Plains on February 2. Gradually intensifying, it was situated over eastern Kentucky by 0000 UTC on February 4. As the system entered West Virginia, a secondary low began to develop over South Carolina. The new low quickly deepened, and absorbed the primary low over West Virginia into its expanding and strengthening circulation. It continued to rapidly mature as it moved northward from eastern Maryland, and it hugged the coast as it moved northeastward towards southern New England.

The cyclone reached a strength of 980 millibars while located south of Long Island. It crossed eastern New England and reached its peak intensity, with a minimum barometric pressure of 962 mb and sustained winds of 75 mph (120 km/h), over eastern Maine. Prior to the nor'easter, an area of high pressure drifted southeastward from north of the Great Lakes, producing sufficient cold air to support snow throughout the Northeast. However, as the storm intensified, precipitation near the coast, including the major cities of Philadelphia, New York, and Boston, changed to rain. Due to the lack of a strong anticyclone at the surface, winds in association with the system were minimal until after the storm abated. Behind the nor'easter, high winds, sufficient to bring down trees and powerlines, occurred.

== Impact ==
Snow from the nor'easter was heavy and widespread. Areas that picked up 10 in (250 mm) or more include Pennsylvania, New York, New Jersey, Connecticut, Massachusetts, Vermont, New Hampshire and Maine. Scattered reports of 20 in (510 mm) were received in upstate New York and northern Vermont. At Burlington, Vermont, 16.8 in (430 mm) of snow fell, beating the daily record of 8.7 in (220 mm) set in 1988. Overall, the event ranks as a category 2 on the Northeast Snowfall Impact Scale.

In Pennsylvania, the heaviest snow fell in Bucks County. Throughout the state, the number of traffic accidents was minimized due to the storm's arrival on a weekend. Three died of cardiac arrest after shoveling snow, and more than 100 people were hospitalized for chest pain. Several dozen more were injured after slipping and falling on ice, and 53 residents sustained snowblower-related injuries. At least 18 people were injured in nearby New Jersey, where the maximum snow accumulation was reported to be 16 inches (41 cm) in Princeton. Along the coast, minor to moderate coastal flooding occurred, along with some beach erosion. Some areas lost power for several hours due to downed power lines caused by fallen tree branches. The cyclone also produced heavy snow and coastal flooding in New York.

== See also ==
- Climate of the United States
- List of NESIS storms
