= December 1960 nor'easter =

Winter storm in the United States

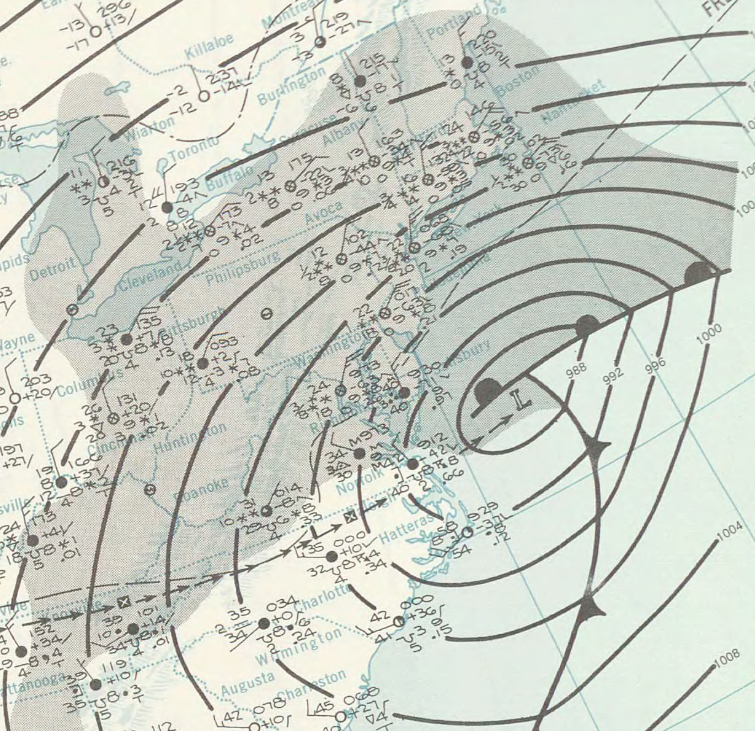
- A surface weather analysis of the intensifying nor'easter on December 12: click to enlarge

Meteorological history
- Formed: December 10, 1960
- Dissipated: After December 14, 1960

Category 2 "Minor" winter storm
- Regional snowfall index: 5.79 (NOAA)
- Lowest pressure: 966 millibars (hPa)
- Maximum snowfall or ice accretion: 21.4 inches (54 cm)

Overall effects
- Fatalities: ~286
- Areas affected: Midwestern United States, Mid-Atlantic states, New England

The December 1960 nor'easter was a significant early-season winter storm that impacted the Mid-Atlantic and New England regions of the United States. Moderate to heavy snowfall fell from West Virginia to eastern Maine, amounting to 10 in (25 cm) or more in parts of 13 states and peaking at 21.4 in (54 cm) at Newark, New Jersey. The storm was accompanied by strong winds, gusting to over 90 mph (140 km/h) in coastal New England, and left in its wake a dangerously cold air mass. The storm originated in a weak low pressure area which formed over the western Gulf of Mexico on December 10. A secondary low developed over South Carolina on the next day, supported by the merger of two troughs aloft. Sliding southeast of New England, the new storm explosively deepened to become a full-fledged nor'easter, with a minimum central air pressure of 966 mbar. It began to weaken over the Canadian Maritimes.

Widespread blizzard conditions wrought havoc on transportation; streets and highways throughout the hardest-hit areas were clogged with stalled and abandoned vehicles, and multiple major airports were forced to close. Many schools and businesses were closed, some for days after the storm departed. The New York Stock Exchange opened an hour late on December 12, marking its first delayed opening in over 25 years. Extensive drifting of snow left communities isolated and unable to receive deliveries of food and heating fuel. Overall, the storm and subsequent cold snap were blamed for at least 286 deaths across a wide area, but primarily in Pennsylvania, New Jersey, New York, and the New England states. The fatalities resulted from a multitude of causes, including automobile and maritime accidents, storm-related fires, carbon monoxide poisoning, over-exertion, and exposure to cold.

== Meteorological history ==
The nor'easter occurred during a positive phase of the North Atlantic oscillation (NAO), though negative NAO values are typically considered optimal for snowstorms in the northeastern United States. It was the first of three severe storms during the 1960–1961 winter season.

It originated in an area of low pressure that developed over the western Gulf of Mexico on December 10, downstream from an upper-level cyclone. The surface low tracked northward to Oklahoma before turning eastward as it gradually intensified. Simultaneously, a shortwave trough swung southeastward around the periphery of a large vortex over central and eastern Canada. As the upper low opened up into a negatively tilted trough and began to interact with the northern wave, a secondary surface cyclone developed along a frontal boundary over South Carolina late on December 11. Almost immediately thereafter, the original low dissipated over West Virginia. Heading toward the northeast, the incipient storm emerged into the Atlantic Ocean near Cape Hatteras, North Carolina, at 00:00 UTC on December 12.

With strong upper-level support—including extensive positive vorticity advection and dual divergent jet streak regions—the storm explosively intensified into a powerful nor'easter. From 00:00 to 12:00 UTC on December 12, the system deepened by 27 mbar while moving to a point south of Nantucket. By contrast, the widely accepted criterion for "bombogenesis" is a 24-mbar central pressure drop in 24 hours. Its core pressure ultimately fell to 966 mbar by 00:00 UTC the next day, while located off the coast of southwestern Nova Scotia. A rapidly tightening pressure gradient north of the cyclone generated strong winds throughout coastal New England. The storm started to slowly weaken as it moved over the Canadian Maritimes on December 13 and 14.

== Impact ==
The initial low pressure system yielded minor snow accumulations in a wide swath of the Great Plains and Midwest. The nor'easter itself dropped much more significant snowfall over the Mid-Atlantic and New England, with 10 in (25 cm) or greater amounts reported in 13 states from West Virginia to Maine. As much as 20 in (51 cm) of snow fell in small areas of northern New Jersey and eastern Massachusetts. The greatest snowfall total associated with the storm was 21.4 in (54 cm) at Newark, New Jersey, within a southwest–northeast oriented corridor of especially heavy snow. In some locations in New Jersey, the storm set new daily snowfall records. Other notable totals include 8.5 in (22 cm) at Washington, D.C.; 14.1 in (36 cm) at Baltimore, Maryland; 14.6 in (37 cm) at Philadelphia, Pennsylvania; 17 in (43 cm) at New York City; 13.4 in (34 cm) at Hartford, Connecticut; 13 in (33 cm) at Boston, Massachusetts; and 14.9 in (38 cm) at Portland, Maine. The storm was rated a "major" Category 3 on the Northeast Snowfall Impact Scale (NESIS), and a "significant" Category 2 on the Regional Snowfall Index (RSI), an updated counterpart to the NESIS. In parts of southern and eastern Virginia, the snow mixed with sleet and freezing rain, creating particularly treacherous road conditions. Seven deaths and numerous injuries resulted from traffic accidents in the state, primarily in the Richmond and Lynchburg areas.

The heavy snow combined with strong winds to create widespread and dangerous blizzard conditions, worsened by very cold temperatures left in the wake of a prior cold front. Wind gusts reached 94 mph (151 km/h) on Block Island and 85 mph (137 km/h) on Nantucket. As it pulled away, the large storm system reinforced the Arctic air mass over the eastern United States, with below-normal temperatures persisting for several days; in northwestern Pennsylvania, nighttime temperatures were as cold as −28 °F (−33 °C). Both during after the storm, persistent gale-force wind gusts produced extensive blowing and drifting of snow. Rough seas and high tides buffeted large sections of shoreline, inflicting damage to boats and coastal installations. A fishing vessel 42 ft (13 m) in length capsized off the coast of Maryland, killing two men, and one fatality was attributed to a maritime incident in New York waters. The U.S. Coast Guard rescued six fishermen whose vessel had run aground at a jetty near the entrance to the Nantucket Harbor.

The storm prompted the closures of public and private schools, businesses, offices, and factories throughout the Northeast. In some areas—such as the city of Boston and parts of New Jersey—classes were canceled for the entire week following the snowstorm. In New York City, student attendance remained extremely low in the days after schools reopened. The New York Public Library was forced to close its main location and all of its 80 branches. Non-essential government offices in Washington, D.C. were also closed because of the storm. Air and ground transportation came to a halt, with multiple major airports closed and rail service suspended. At La Guardia and Idlewild (now John F. Kennedy International) airports alone, over 100 flights were canceled. Railroads reported tens of millions of dollars in lost revenue and storm-related expenses.

Snow drifts reaching 10 ft (3.0 m) in height and abandoned vehicles rendered many roadways impassable. With some communities effectively isolated, supplies of food and heating fuel began to run short. The National Guard arrived in New York City to clear obstructions from streets and allow snow removal work to get underway. In total, 19,000 workers were tasked with clearing snow in New York City, restoring "near normal" conditions after several days. The northbound Jersey Turnpike became choked with miles of stalled vehicles, and a large stretch of the Maine Turnpike was closed after "an unestimated number of motorists were marooned". At the latter, dozens of state troopers and turnpike employees helped stranded drivers find shelter amid the dangerously cold conditions; at a restaurant in Kennebunk, police ordered 180 motorists to remain inside until the highway could be cleared. In Boston, vehicles stranded in city streets blocked emergency responders from reaching fire situations; such delays were likely responsible for several additional fatalities. A large fire in Mystic, Connecticut, claimed 10 buildings at the height of the storm, with damages estimated at over $1 million.

By December 15, newspapers had attributed 286 deaths to the blizzard, including 54 in New York, 51 in New Jersey (later confirmed as 52), 26 in Pennsylvania, and 71 in the New England states. Fatalities related to the storm and associated cold snap were far-reaching, involving 23 states. A wide variety of factors contributed to the high death toll, including over-exertion, exposure to cold, transportation accidents, structural fires, and carbon monoxide poisoning. The storm caused some isolated power failures along its path. In north-central Virginia, telephone and electricity lines were damaged. The blizzard cut electricity to all of Newtown, Connecticut, though it was mostly restored within hours. In Rhode Island, Block Island and some inland towns were without power. Short-lived power outages affected southern New Hampshire.

Occurring at an important time for Christmas shopping, the storm had a significant economic impact. In the week after the blizzard, national sales fell as much as seven percent relative to the corresponding week in 1959. The New York Stock Exchange opened an hour late on December 12 in its first delayed opening since 1934.

== See also ==
- Climate of the United States
- List of NESIS storms
