= March 1960 nor'easter =

1960 storm in the north-eastern United States

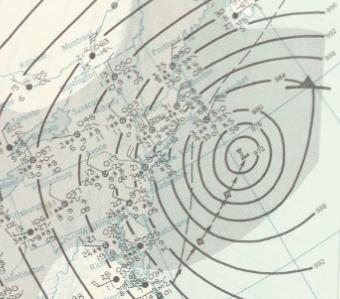
- A surface weather analysis of the nor'easter on March 4

Category 4 "Crippling" winter storm
- Regional snowfall index: 14.53 (NOAA)

The March 1960 nor'easter was a severe winter storm that impacted the Mid-Atlantic and New England regions of the United States. The storm ranked as Category 4, or "crippling", on the Northeast Snowfall Impact Scale. Northeasterly flow, combined with the storm's slower forward motion, enhanced snowfall across the region. The cyclone began moving away from the United States on March 5. It took place during a stormy period in the affected region, contributing to record snowfall.

== Impact ==
The storm's impacts were wide-reaching; snow accumulated from the southeastern United States through northern New England. Totals exceeding 10 in (25 cm) were reported from West Virginia to Maine, while snowfall of over 20 in (51 cm) fell in parts of eastern Massachusetts, Rhode Island, northern Connecticut, southern New Hampshire, northern New Jersey and southeastern New York. Nantucket, Massachusetts reported 31.3 in (80 cm) of snow, the most on record.

Blizzard conditions organized in eastern Massachusetts, accompanied by intense winds. The storm caused at least 80 fatalities and stranded thousands of residents. Schools were forced to close, and transportation was severely disrupted. Stalled vehicles on roadways hampered snow removal efforts. New York City received the most severe winter storm since 1948. Many commuters in Manhattan became marooned. Major airports closed during the storm, resulting in the cancellation of hundreds of flights.

== See also ==
- Climate of the United States
- List of NESIS storms
