= List of Northeast snowfall impact scale winter storms =

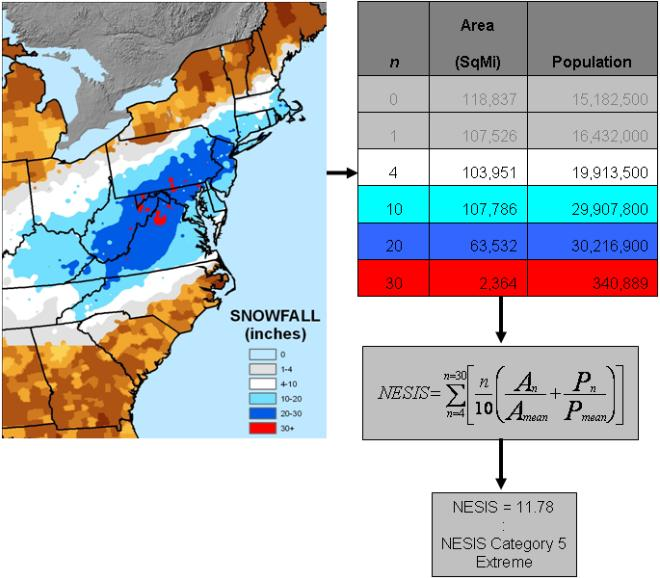
Description of the NESIS scale

The Northeast snowfall impact scale (NESIS) is a scale used to categorize winter storms in the Northeast United States. The scale was developed by meteorologists Paul Kocin and Louis Uccellini, and ranks snowstorms from category 1 ("notable") to category 5 ("extreme"). Only two historical blizzards, the 1993 Storm of the Century and the North American blizzard of 1996 are rated in the 5 "extreme" category. The scale differs from the Saffir–Simpson hurricane scale and Fujita scale, which are used to classify tropical cyclones and tornadoes, respectively, in that it takes into account the number of people affected by the storm. The scale, as devised, is intended chiefly to assess past storms rather than assist in forecasts. This scale takes into account population size of the Northeast, and thus snowfall amounts are often not that high.

== List ==
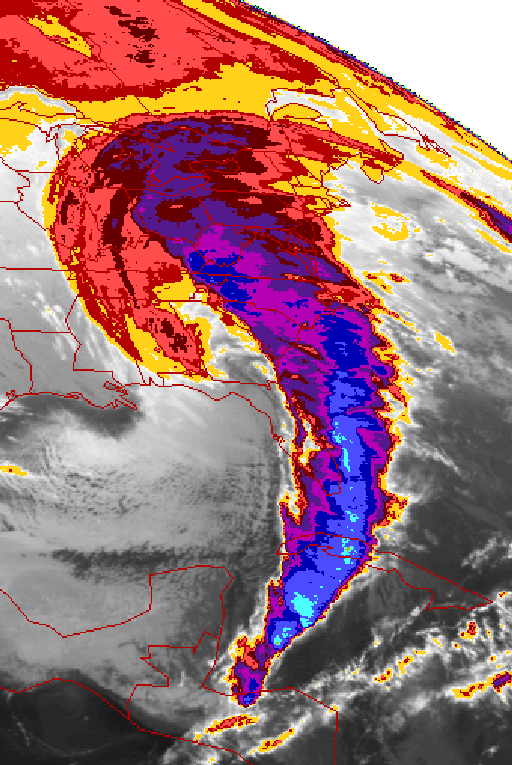
Satellite image of the 1993 Storm of the Century, the highest-ranking NESIS storm

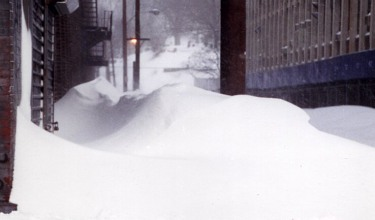
Snow drifts from the North American blizzard of 1996

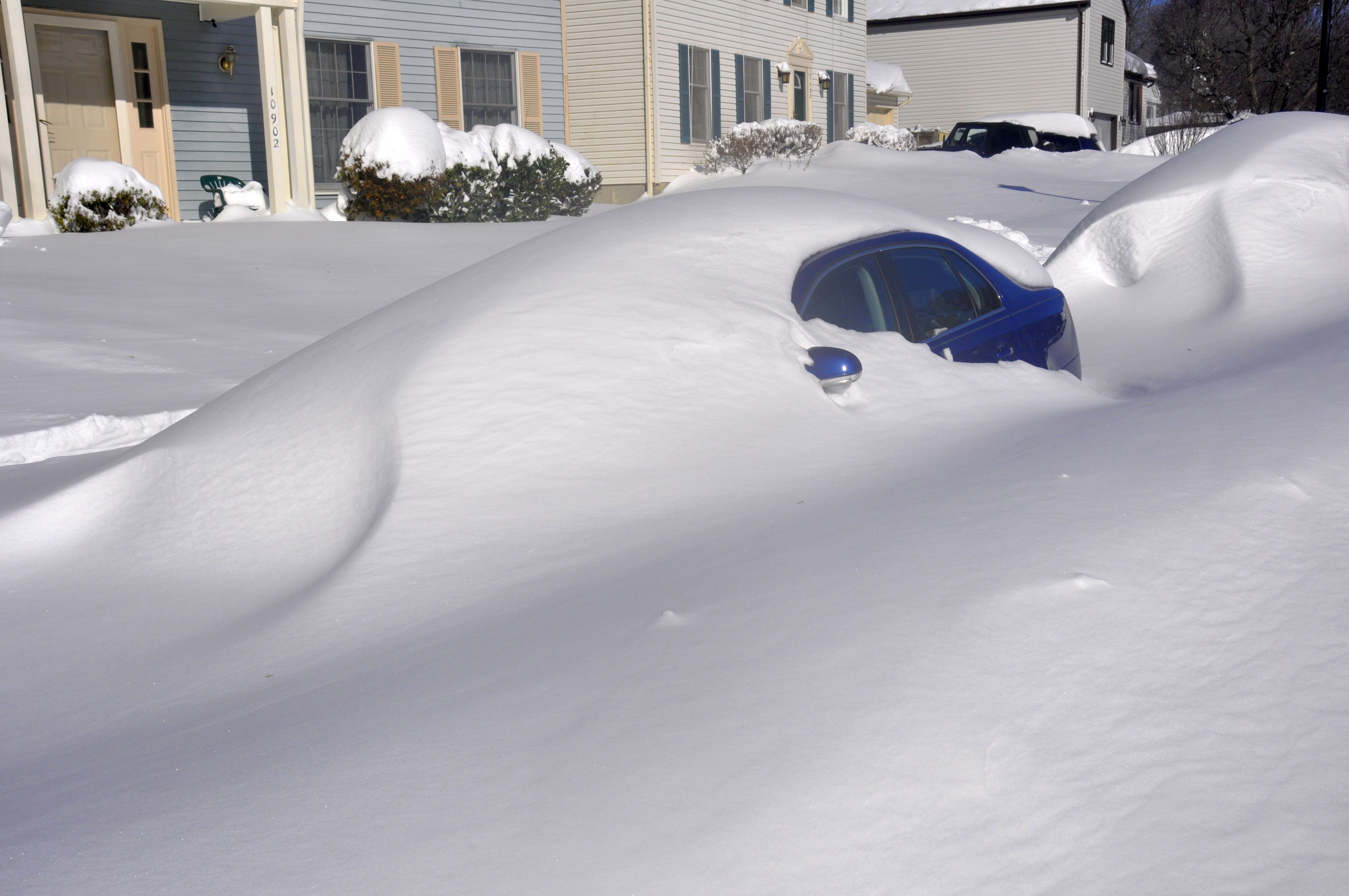
A car almost completely buried in snow following the January 2016 United States blizzard

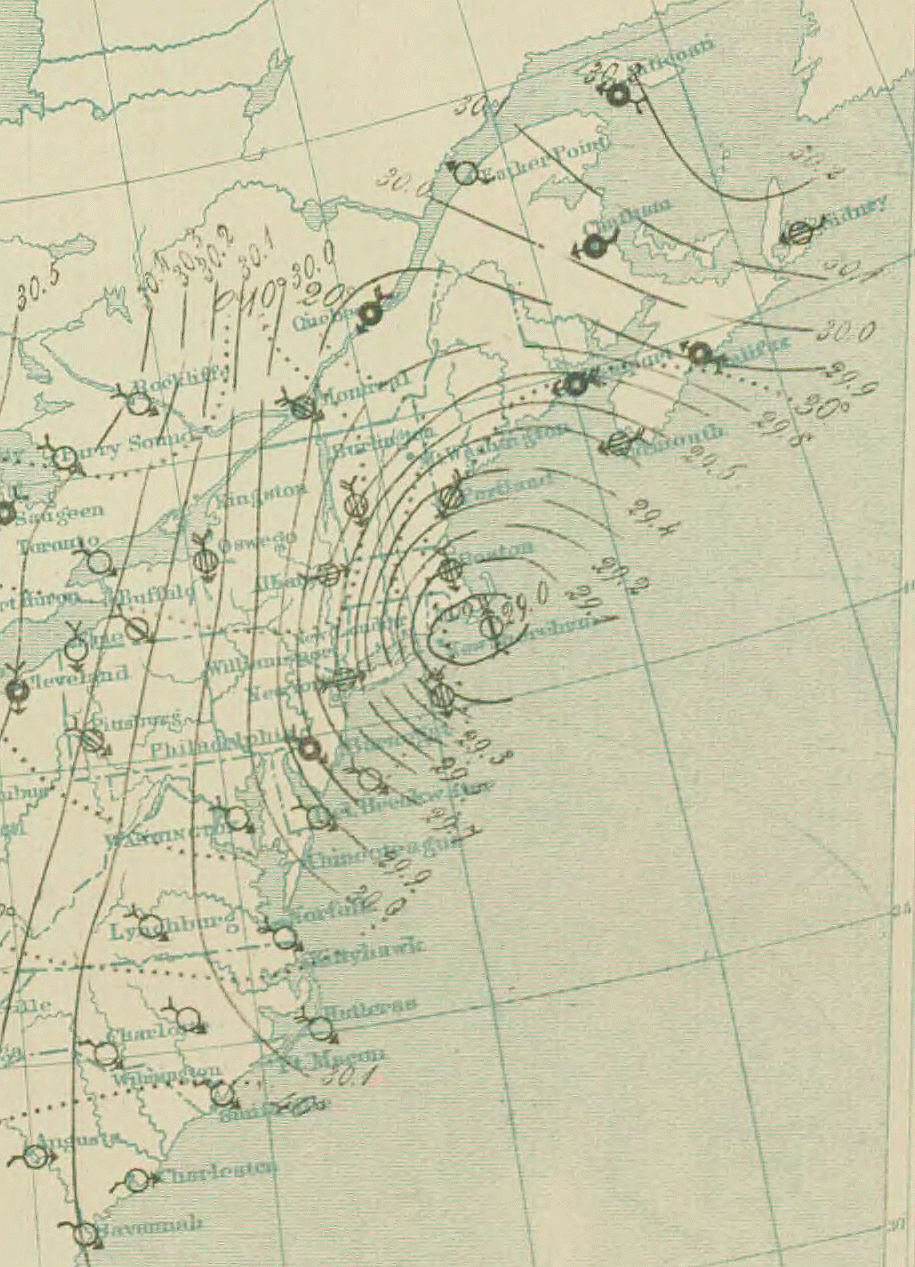
Surface weather analysis of the Great Blizzard of 1888 on March 12

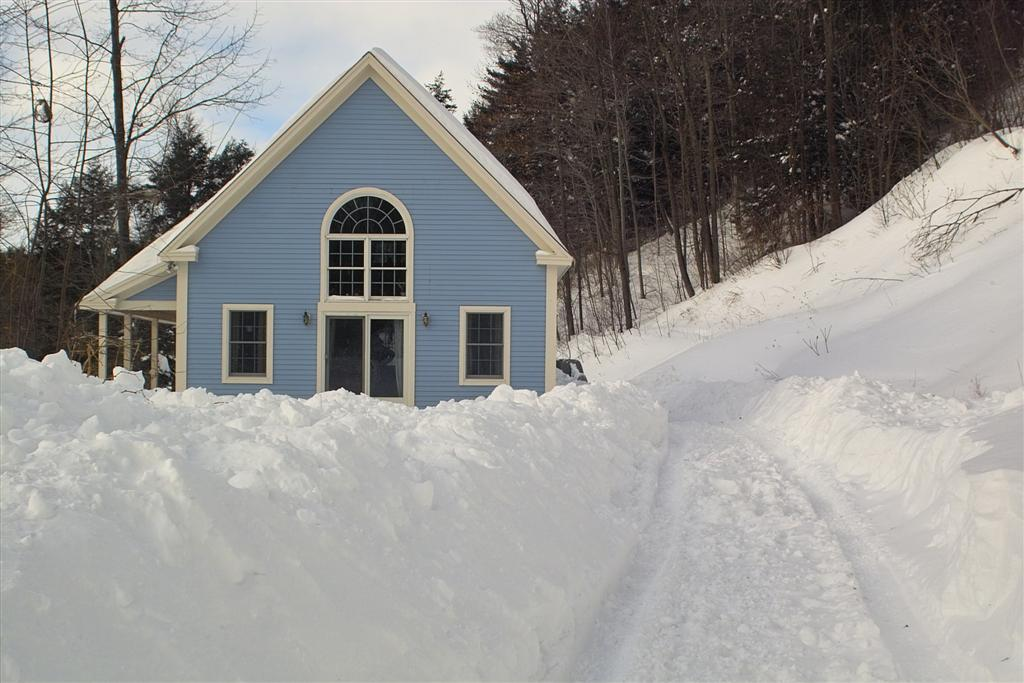
Snowfall from the North American blizzard of 2007 in Vermont

There are two available values for NESIS. The original values that Paul Kocin and Louis Uccellini computed for storms in their original 2004 work "A Snowfall Impact Scale Derived From Northeast Storm Snowfall Distributions" and the NESIS storm values recomputed using some different data and differing methods by the National Climatic Data Center (NCDC) in 2005 to productionize their work for assigning values to future storm storms beyond Kocin/Uccellini work. Kocin/Uccellini originally computed NESIS values for 70 storms from 1888 to 2003. The NCDC recomputed NESIS values for 30 of the same storms and has since for newer storms beyond 2003.

Storms pre-2005 use the Kocin/Uccellini rating and description. Storms 2005 and onward use the NCDC rating and description. NOAA's National Centers for Environmental Information publishes a list of storms with ratings and other information, starting with the March 1956 storm.

Date	Original NESIS	NCDC NESIS	Category	Description
March 11–14, 1888	08.34	-	4	Crippling
February 11–14, 1899	08.11	-	4	Crippling
December 26–27, 1947	03.50	-	2	Significant
February 16–17, 1952	02.17	-	1	Notable
March 16–17, 1956	02.93	-	2	Significant
March 18–19, 1956	02.23	01.87	1	Notable
December 3–5, 1957	01.32	-	1	Notable
February 14–17, 1958	05.98	06.25	3	Major
March 18–21, 1958	03.92	03.51	2	Significant
March 12–13, 1959	03.64	-	2	Significant
February 14–15, 1960	04.17	-	3	Major
March 2–5, 1960	07.63	08.77	4	Crippling
December 11–13, 1960	04.47	04.53	3	Major
January 18–21, 1961	03.47	04.04	2	Significant
February 2–5, 1961	06.24	07.06	4	Crippling
December 23–25, 1961	01.37	-	1	Notable
February 14–15, 1962	01.59	-	1	Notable
March 6–7, 1962	02.76	-	4	Crippling
December 22–23, 1963	03.17	-	2	Significant
January 11–14, 1964	05.74	06.91	3	Major
February 19–20, 1964	02.39	-	1	Notable
January 16–17, 1965	01.95	-	1	Notable
January 22–23, 1966	04.45	-	3	Major
January 29–31, 1966	05.19	05.93	4	Crippling
December 23–25, 1966	03.79	03.81	2	Significant
February 5–7, 1967	03.82	03.50	2	Significant
March 21–22, 1967	01.20	-	2	Significant
February 8–10, 1969	03.34	03.51	2	Significant
February 22–28, 1969	04.01	04.29	3	Major
December 25–27, 1969	05.19	06.29	3	Major
December 31, 1970–January 1, 1971	02.10	-	1	Notable
March 3–5, 1971	03.73	-	2	Significant
November 25–27, 1971	02.33	-	1	Notable
February 18–20, 1972	04.19	04.77	3	Major
January 16–18, 1978	04.10	-	3	Major
January 19–21, 1978	05.90	06.53	4	Crippling
February 5–7, 1978	06.25	05.78	3	Major
February 17–19, 1979	04.42	04.77	3	Major
January 13–15, 1982	03.08	-	2	Significant
April 6–7, 1982	03.75	03.35	2	Significant
February 10–12, 1983	06.28	06.25	4	Crippling
March 8–9, 1984	01.29	-	1	Notable
March 28–29, 1984	01.86	-	1	Notable
January 1–2, 1987	02.26	-	1	Notable
January 21–23, 1987	04.93	05.40	3	Major
January 25–26, 1987	01.70	01.19	1	Notable
February 22–23, 1987	01.46	01.46	1	Notable
January 7–8, 1988	04.85	-	3	Major
December 26–27, 1990	01.56	-	1	Notable
December 10–12, 1990	03.10	-	2	Significant
March 12–14, 1993	12.52	13.20	5	Extreme
January 3–5, 1994	02.87	-	2	Significant
February 8–12, 1994	04.81	05.39	3	Major
March 2–4, 1994	03.46	-	2	Significant
February 2–4, 1995	03.51	01.43	2	Significant
December 19–20, 1995	03.32	-	2	Significant
January 6–8, 1996	11.54	11.78	5	Extreme
February 2–4, 1996	02.03	-	1	Notable
February 16–17, 1996	01.65	-	1	Notable
March 31–April 1, 1997	02.37	02.29	1	Notable
March 14–15, 1999	02.20	-	1	Notable
January 24–26, 2000	03.14	02.52	2	Significant
December 30–31, 2000	02.48	02.37	1	Notable
March 3–5, 2001	03.53	-	2	Significant
December 4–5, 2002	01.99	-	1	Notable
December 24–25, 2002	04.42	-	3	Major
January 3–4, 2003	02.65	-	2	Significant
February 6–7, 2003	01.18	-	1	Notable
February 15–18, 2003	08.91	07.50	4	Crippling
January 21–24, 2005	-	06.80	4	Crippling
February 12–13, 2006	-	04.10	3	Major
February 12–15, 2007	-	05.63	3	Major
March 15–18, 2007	-	02.54	2	Significant
March 1–3, 2009	-	01.59	1	Notable
December 18–21, 2009	-	03.99	2	Significant
February 4–7, 2010	-	04.38	3	Major
February 9–11, 2010	-	04.10	3	Major
February 25–27, 2010	-	05.46	3	Major
December 26–27, 2010	-	04.92	3	Major
January 9–13, 2011		05.31	3	Major
January 26–27, 2011	-	02.17	1	Notable
February 1–3, 2011	-	05.30	3	Major
October 28–30, 2011	-	01.75	1	Notable
February 7–10, 2013	-	04.35	3	Major
March 4–9, 2013	-	03.05	2	Significant
December 13–16, 2013	-	02.95	2	Significant
December 30, 2013–January 3, 2014	-	03.31	2	Significant
January 20–22, 2014	-	01.26	1	Notable
January 29–February 4, 2014	-	04.08	3	Major
February 11–14, 2014	-	05.28	4	Crippling
November 26–28, 2014	-	01.56	1	Notable
December 9–14, 2014	-	01.49	1	Notable
January 25–28, 2015	-	02.62	3	Major
January 29–February 3, 2015	-	05.42	3	Major
February 8–11, 2015	-	01.32	1	Notable
January 22–24, 2016	-	07.66	5	Extreme
March 12–15, 2017	-	05.03	3	Major
January 3–5, 2018	-	02.27	1	Notable
March 1–3, 2018	-	01.65	1	Notable
March 5–8, 2018	-	03.45	2	Significant
March 11–15, 2018	-	03.16	2	Significant
March 20–22, 2018	-	01.63	1	Notable
December 14–18, 2020	-	03.21	2	Significant
January 30–February 3, 2021	-	04.93	3	Major
January 1–4, 2022	-	01.06	1	Notable
January 4-7, 2022	-	01.60	1	Notable
January 28-30, 2022	-	01.73	1	Notable
February 1-5, 2022	-	04.53	3	Major
December 13-20, 2022	-	08.52	4	Crippling
December 21-26, 2022	-	02.66	2	Significant
February 21-24, 2023	-	03.37	2	Significant
March 12-16, 2023	-	02.99	2	Significant
January 5-8, 2024	-	01.43	1	Notable
January 14-17, 2024	-	01.50	1	Notable
January 4-7, 2025	-	02.14	1	Notable
February 14-17, 2025	-	02.04	1	Notable
January 23-26, 2026	-	07.78	4	Crippling
February 22-24, 2026	-	03.86	2	Significant

== See also ==
- Regional snowfall index
- List of regional snowfall index category 5 winter storms
- List of regional snowfall index category 4 winter storms
- List of blizzards
