= March 18–22, 1958, nor'easter =

1958 winter storm

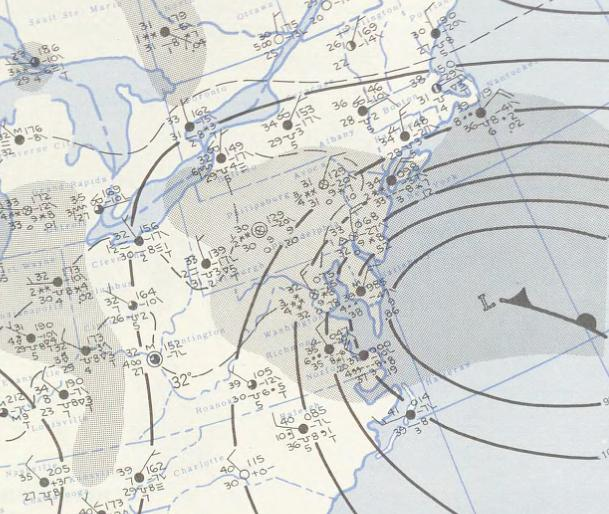
- Surface weather analysis of the storm

Category 3 "Major" winter storm
- Regional snowfall index: 7.14 (NOAA)

The March 18–22, 1958 nor'easter was an unusual late-season and violent winter storm that impacted the Mid-Atlantic and New England regions of the United States. Its snowfall extended from North Carolina through Maine.

== Analysis and impacts ==
On June 15, 1958, Raymond A. Green, a meteorologist at the extended forecast section of the United States Weather Bureau office in Washington, D.C., published a detailed analysis of this storm system, in which it was described as a “violent snowstorm”. This storm contained winds up to hurricane strength and it produced heavy snowfall across the Northeastern United States. 29 inches (74 cm) of snow was reported to have fallen in Mount Airy, Maryland. Multiple locations in the interior parts of Pennsylvania had up to 40 inches (100 cm) of snow. The United States Weather Bureau stated that this storm was “the worst in 40 years in parts of Pennsylvania”.

On the same day as Green's publication, Alan N. Sanderson and Ralph B. Mason Jr., meteorologists who worked at the United States Weather Bureau’s National Weather Analysis Center, in Washington D.C., published a seven page analysis on this storm system and a storm a week earlier. Sanderson and Mason Jr. noted that most of the snowfall in Pennsylvania came down in “paralyzing quantities”.

== See also ==
- Climate of the United States
- List of NESIS storms
