= December 2000 nor'easter =

Coordinates: 40.386°N 73.677°W

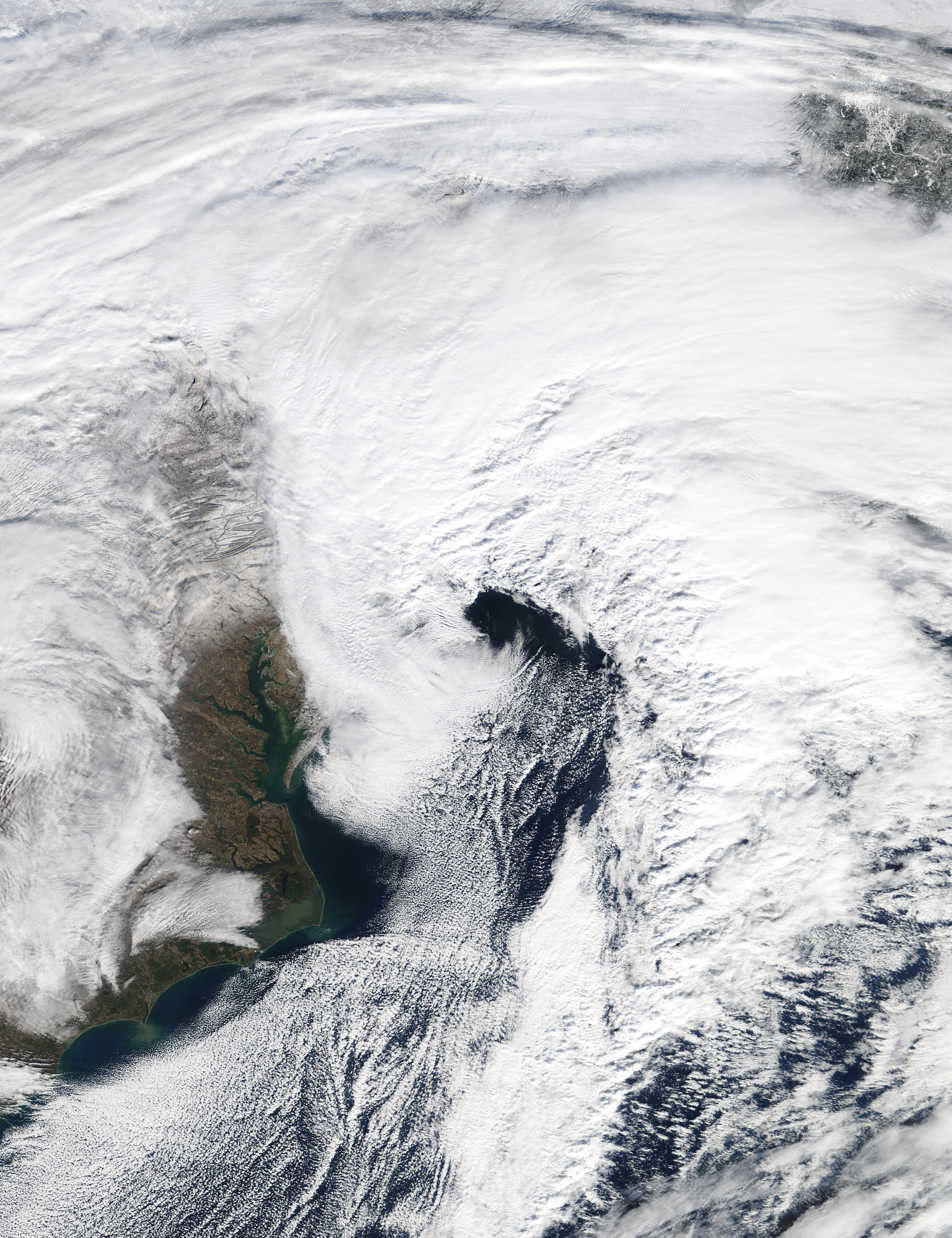
- Satellite imagery of the nor'easter off the Jersey Shore on December 30

Meteorological history
- Formed: December 27, 2000
- Dissipated: December 31, 2000

Category 2 "Minor" winter storm
- Regional snowfall index: 3.37 (NOAA)
- Lowest pressure: 992 mb (hPa)
- Max. snowfall: 30 in (76 cm) west of New York City, New York

Overall effects
- Areas affected: Northeastern United States, Atlantic Canada
- Power outages: 5,500

The December 2000 nor'easter was a significant winter storm that impacted the Mid-Atlantic and New England regions of the United States around the end of the month. It began as an Alberta clipper that moved southeastward through the central United States and weakened over the Ohio Valley. However, it redeveloped off the coast of North Carolina and moved northward as it intensified. It moved into central Long Island and eventually tracked northward into New England. The storm dropped heavy precipitation throughout the Northeast, especially in northern New Jersey and eastern New York, where snowfall often exceeded 2 ft (0.61 m). Even so, as it struck on a weekend, its effects were generally minor and mostly limited to travel delays, traffic accidents, and business closures.

== Synoptic history ==
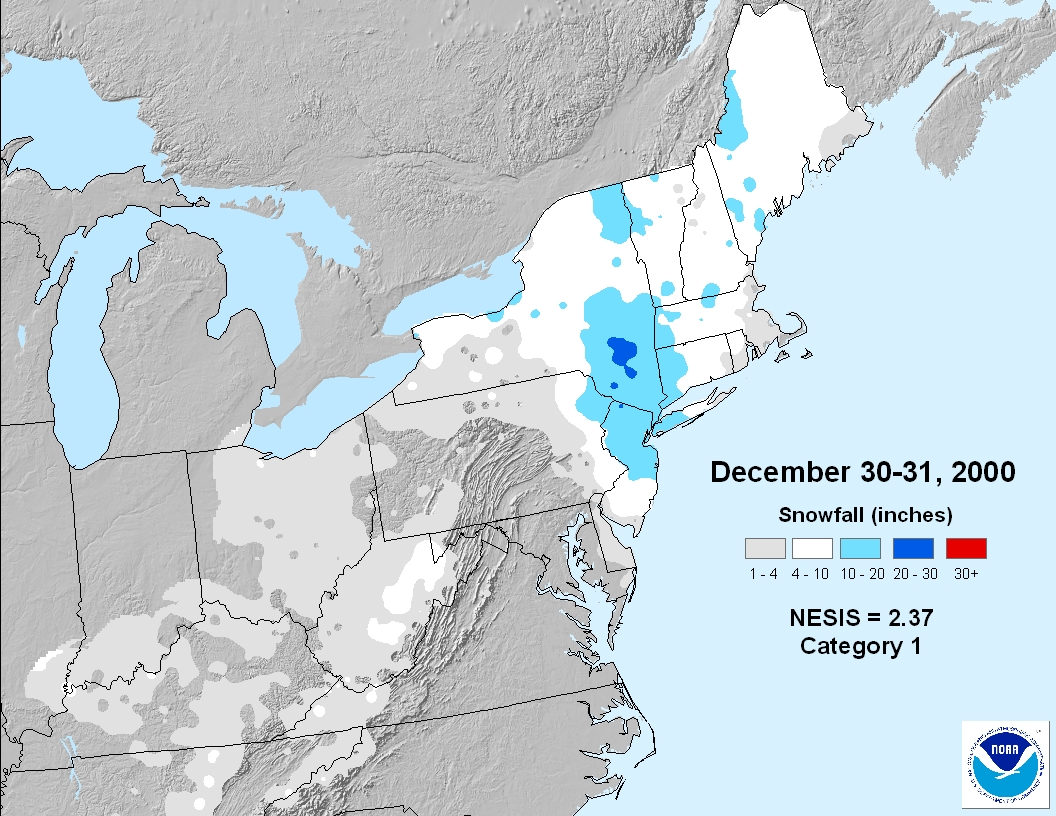
Snowfall accumulations from the nor'easter

The storm developed as an Alberta clipper-type low pressure area that moved southeastward across the Great Plains and Midwest. Throughout North Dakota, Minnesota and Iowa, moderate snowfall accompanied the system. After weakening over the Ohio Valley, the storm redeveloped off the coast of North Carolina. In the days preceding the event, a cyclone over eastern Canada circulated cold air southward. Computer models indicated the potential for a major storm up to seven days in advance; however, initially, certain forecasts suggested that a separate storm over the southern U.S. would merge with the clipper. Instead, this feature moved out to sea.

As the secondary storm began to intensify offshore, precipitation rapidly expanded and tracked northward towards southern Virginia, eastern Maryland and Delaware, largely in the form of freezing rain, ice, and snow. From 0200 UTC on December 30 to 1200 UTC, the cyclone intensified by 13 mbar, and continued to deepen for several more hours. Snowfall reached southern New Jersey between 0600 and 0800 UTC, and New York City at around 1000 UTC. Thundersnow developed within heavy bands in some areas. The significant snow was characterized by a sharp western cutoff; for example, in Chester County, accumulations ranged from around 6 inches in the far eastern parts of the county to only an inch along its western border with Lancaster County.

While located off the New Jersey coast, the storm stopped strengthening and slowly moved northward. The center was situated near central Long Island at 2100 UTC. Across eastern Long Island and parts of eastern New England, snow mixed with and, in some cases, changed over to rain. The surface low had moved into eastern Connecticut by early on December 31. As it continued to head northeastward, a new center of low pressure developed near Boston and moved towards coastal Maine. The storm system had abated by January 1.

== Impact ==
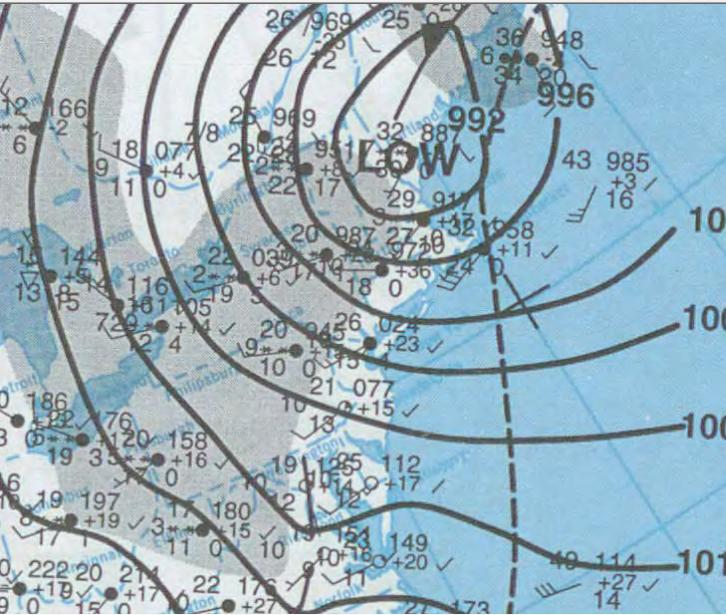
Weather map of the nor'easter on December 31, 2000

The storm produced moderate to heavy snowfall from eastern Pennsylvania through New Jersey, New York, and New England, extending as far north as Maine. As much as 30 in (0.76 m) fell west of the New York City metropolitan region, which generally reported 10 to 16 in (0.25 to 0.41 m) of snow, making it the biggest snowstorm at the time since the North American blizzard of 1996. Washington, D.C., and Baltimore recorded little or no snowfall, while 10 in (25 cm) impacted Philadelphia. Eastern New York, especially the Hudson Valley and Catskill Mountains, western Connecticut, western and central Massachusetts, Vermont, New Hampshire and Maine also picked up heavy snowfall. Eastern New England received up to 1 ft (0.30 m) before dry air from the south reduced the duration of the snow.

About 30 flights were canceled at the Philadelphia International Airport, and the city declared a snow emergency. Amtrak canceled Metroliner service along the northeast corridor from Washington, D.C., to New York City. Numerous businesses throughout eastern Pennsylvania closed on December 30, although because the storm struck on a weekend, the number of traffic accidents was fairly low.

In New Jersey, increasing winds caused blowing and drifting of the snow and led to near-blizzard conditions. Behind the storm, very cold and gusty weather lingered. New Jersey Transit shut down bus service in northern portions of the state, and rail lines had 20-minute delays. Most injuries in the state were related to physical strain while shoveling, snow blower accidents or slips and falls. As the snowfall was of a light nature, few trees limbs and electrical wires were downed by the storm. GPU Energy reported only around 5,500 power outages. A countywide state of emergency was declared in Sussex County, as vehicles were sliding off roadways. Several other traffic accidents and delays were reported throughout the state, and in Somerset County, a few roads were closed due to the snow. A Red Cross shelter was opened for residents of a Spotswood trailer park.

In New York State, the heaviest snow peaked at 29 in (0.74 m) in Platte Cove, Greene County. Despite 50 flight cancellations at the Albany International Airport and several traffic accidents, no major damage or injuries were reported. Although heavy snow fell in the state, no major damage was reported in Connecticut. In Massachusetts and Rhode Island, high winds, gusting to as high as 50 mph (80 km/h) buffeted the coast.

== See also ==
- Climate of the United States
