= Paul Kocin =

American meteorologist

- Born: May 6, 1955 (age 71)
- Education: Cornell University (BS); Pennsylvania State University (MS)
- Known for: Development of Northeast snowfall impact scale
- Scientific career
- Fields: Meteorology
- Workplaces: NOAA; The Weather Channel

Paul Kocin (born May 6, 1955) is an American meteorologist and winter weather expert. He grew up on Long Island, New York and received his B.S. from Cornell University, followed by his M.Sc. from Pennsylvania State University. After graduation, he briefly worked for NASA as a contractor then was hired by the US National Weather Service at the Hydrometeorological Prediction Center in 1989. Kocin worked as an on-air personality with The Weather Channel from 1998 to 2006. He returned to NOAA afterward, first as a surface weather analyst and then to the medium range desk, forecasting weather for Alaska up to eight days in advance.

Along with Louis Uccellini, Kocin developed the Northeast snowfall impact scale, which categorizes significant Northeastern United States snowstorms from "notable" to "extreme". They also created volumes concerning these storms during the 1990s and 2000s.
