= Northeast snowfall impact scale =

Snowstorm intensity scale

The Northeast snowfall impact scale (NESIS) was created to measure snowstorms in the U.S. Northeast in much the same way the Saffir–Simpson scale records hurricane intensity and the enhanced Fujita scale with tornadoes. This scale takes into account the very high population of the Northeast, and thus snowfall amounts are often smaller compared to what other areas of the USA would consider significant snowfall amounts.

== The scale ==
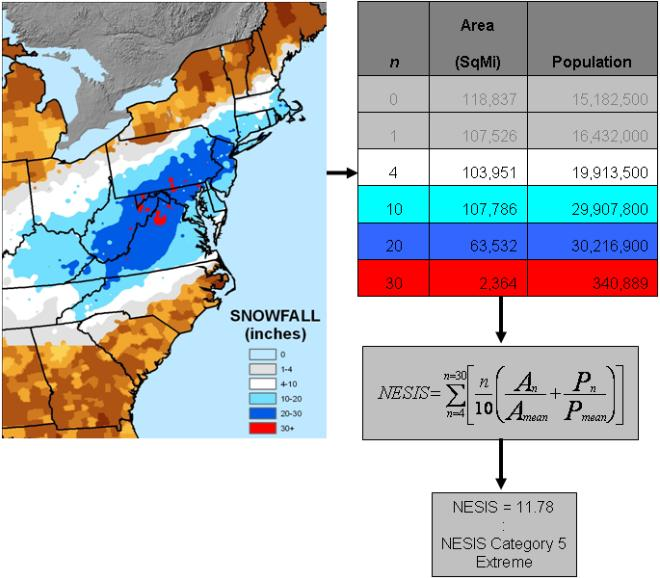
Description of the NESIS scale

NESIS was created by Paul Kocin of The Weather Channel and Louis Uccellini of the National Weather Service, and classifies storms in one of five ways that range from notable (the weakest designation) to significant, major, crippling, and extreme. This helps to measure storms have on the economy and transportation throughout the major cities in the Northeastern United States as well as the country as a whole.

Category	NESIS value	Description
1	1–2.499	Notable
2	2.5–3.99	Significant
3	4–5.99	Major
4	6–9.99	Crippling
5	10.0+	Extreme

The variables measured on the scale include area, amount of snowfall, and the number of people living in the path of the storm. These numbers are calculated into a raw data number ranging from "1" for an insignificant fall to over "10" for a massive snowstorm. Based on these raw numbers, the storm is placed into one of the five categories. The largest NESIS values result from storms producing heavy snowfall over large areas that include major metropolitan areas. Only three historical storms—the 1993 Storm of the Century, the North American blizzard of 1996, and the January 2016 United States blizzard—are in the Category 5, with a NESIS value higher than 10.

The northeast is the first region in the U.S. to use a system that measures the impact of snowfall because it is so densely populated. The scale also allows for meteorologists to predict how long airport delays caused snowstorms will last and when things will become normal afterward. According to Uccellini, NESIS will be used to reevaluate recent snowstorms and measure their impact and not as forecasts such as the ones that are created for hurricanes.

== Example ==
By using an example of the area from Washington D.C. to Boston, a notable, or category 1, snowfall would drop 4–10 inches of snow. A category 2 would affect same area but more people with more than 10 inches of snow on Mid-Atlantic seaboard. A category 3 would bring about 10–20 inches of snow and affect millions of people in the process.

== Gaps in effectivity ==
NESIS only takes into account the raw snow totals and impacted population. It does not account for any of the following hazards associated with winter storms:

- Blizzard conditions, blowing snow, and reduced visibility in general
- Gale-force, storm-force, or even hurricane-force winds and accompanying dangerously low windchill temperatures, causing wind damage and frostbite
- Freezing rain up to and including ice storm conditions
- Sleet, which behaves like a thin layer of quicksand on the road. Cars sink in it or drive across the surface and then slide over the slick individual pellets when attempting to brake. Sleet is very difficult to remove from roads. Due to its self-distributive properties and high weight relative to snow, most snow removal equipment is not suited to the task of removing sleet. Sleet has been referred to as "winter's sand" because when walking across it, kicking it, or picking it up and letting it drop or slide through your fingers, it feels and behaves like sand.
- Thundersnow, which, as shown by Chicago's 2011 Groundhog Day blizzard, can produce small hail and/or combine with destructive blizzard winds to meet the criteria for severe thunderstorms (however, due to public confusion issues related to the connotation of the term "severe thunderstorm", typically associated with heavy rain, very few of these actually prompt a severe thunderstorm warning from the U.S. National Weather Service)
- Storm surge caused by the aforementioned winds on lakes and on the coast and accompanying wave action

A theoretical blizzard may only impact enough people with enough snow to rate a category 2 on NESIS, but bring winds of over 70 MPH, paralyzing the region for days as 5–10 foot drifts and windblown debris are removed. Also, NESIS specifically provides for the storm's impact to the entire population of the affected area. This makes it unusable when trying to describe local conditions caused by a storm.

== See also ==
- List of Northeast snowfall impact scale winter storms
- Regional snowfall index
