= March 2013 nor'easter =

2013 storm affecting the eastern United States

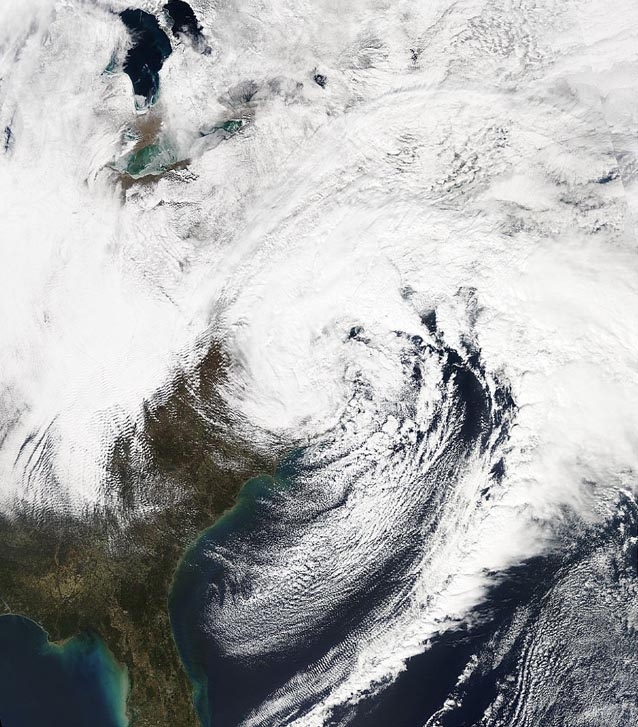
- Satellite image of the nor'easter on March 7.

Meteorological history
- Formed: March 1, 2013
- Dissipated: March 21, 2013

Category 1 "Notable" winter storm
- Regional snowfall index: 2.53 (NOAA)
- Lowest pressure: 986 mbar (29.1 inHg)
- Max. snowfall: 36 inches (91 cm); Near Bear Paw Ski Bowl, Montana

Overall effects
- Fatalities: At least 10 fatalities
- Areas affected: Alaska; British Columbia; Eastern Canada; Contiguous United States; Bermuda; Azores; Madeira; Canary Islands; Ireland; United Kingdom; Western Europe
- Power outages: >250,000
- Part of the 2012–13 North American winter

The March 2013 nor'easter was a powerful nor'easter that affected much of the United States, most notably New England. On March 6, the system moved into the Mid-Atlantic region of the east coast, and intensified into a nor'easter, dumping up to 3 feet of snow in some places. By late March 6, 2013, the nor'easter had knocked out power to about 250,000 homes and businesses.

== Meteorological history ==
Just after the February winter storm, an extratropical cyclone developed on early March 1, 2013, in the Gulf of Alaska moved ashore in British Columbia. After moving ashore, the storm weakened as it moved into the Western United States. Over the next few days, the storm dumped large amounts of snow across the Western States and the Great Plains, affecting areas that were already impacted by a previous blizzard. The storm quickly moved eastwards while slowly restrengthening. On March 4, the storm developed a severe side over the southern states, after tapping into moisture coming from the Gulf of Mexico. On March 5, the storm developed into a blizzard, while it was over the midsection of the Eastern United States, adding more snow to areas that had already received record snowfall from previous major winter storms. The blizzard conditions resulted in multiple flight cancellations and traffic problems across the Eastern States. A maximum amount of 36 inches of snow was recorded near the Bear Paw Ski Bowl in Montana. On March 6, the system moved off the coast of Virginia, and intensified into a nor'easter. The storm curved towards the northeast, and began impacting New England. Light precipitation began as early as the morning of Wednesday, March 6. This precipitation started as drizzle but changed over to light snow showers as the day progressed. On the morning of Thursday, March 7, heavy snow began in parts of Connecticut, followed by a lull. This period of snow led to many 90 minute delays for Connecticut school districts. On Thursday, March 7, the nor'easter slowly began pulling away from the east coast as it moved northeastward. However, the storm continued to intensify, and brought heavy snow and powerful winds to parts of New England beginning Thursday night. From late March 7 to March 8, the nor'easter absorbed a smaller system coming in from the west, adding much more moisture to the storm, which resulted in heavy snowfall across parts of New England. Heavy snow in southern New England continued from Thursday night through much of the day on Friday. Over 2 days, the storm had dumped 10+ inches of snow across 11 states from Montana to Massachusetts. This added more snow to an already record-breaking snowfall season, which was brought on by multiple previous winter storms from February. Early on March 8, the nor'easter stalled off the coast of northern New England while maintaining its intensity, due to a blocking ridge of high pressure over Newfoundland. Later on March 8, the nor'easter began affecting southern Newfoundland, while continuing to intensify. At this time, the nor'easter reached its peak intensity of 986 millibars. On March 9, the ridge of high pressure over Newfoundland weakened enough for the nor'easter to begin moving out to sea. Up to 29.8 inches of snow were recorded in Milton, Massachusetts, by the end of the storm's snowfall on March 9. The nor'easter slowly weakened while moving eastwards, and its winds were still felt for several hours on March 9 after the snowfall had ended. By March 10, the nor'easter had completely left the east coast.

On March 11, the nor'easter reached the middle of the North Atlantic Ocean and continued weakening, as it slowly moved eastwards. On the same day, the nor'easter lost its frontal boundary and became an Upper-level low, and its eye began to shrink. On March 12, the nor'easter stalled, and began absorbing moisture coming from the tropics, and the storm lost its eye. On March 13, the system began losing its organization, and spawned a new frontal low to the north, which brought thunderstorms and strong winds to the Azores Islands. The storm slowly began moving eastward, as it continued weakening steadily. On March 14, The storm began to accelerate towards the northeast and became an extratropical storm again. Later on the same day, the system slightly reintensified and absorbed the new low, while spawning a few small circulations around the edge of the storm. The storm brought rain to Madeira, and brought cloudy weather to the Canary Islands. On March 15, the nor'easter began to rapidly weaken, and lost a lot of moisture, as it continued accelerating towards Western Europe. On March 16, the system began interacting with a much more powerful storm complex situated over the United Kingdom, and brought thunderstorms to parts of Western Europe. On March 17, the system rapidly became disorganized as it began being absorbed by the larger storm complex. During the next several days, the storm system continued to move eastward, while slowly degenerating. On March 21, the system was completely absorbed by the larger storm complex, while located over the northern Adriatic Sea.

== Preparations ==
Virginia's Governor Bob McDonnell declared a state of emergency and about 100 National Guard soldiers for snow duty. The National Weather Service issued coastal flood warnings for parts of Massachusetts, New Jersey, New York, Delaware, Maryland and Virginia. About 300 National Guard troops will be used along the Massachusetts coast to help with flooding and possible evacuations.

== Impact ==
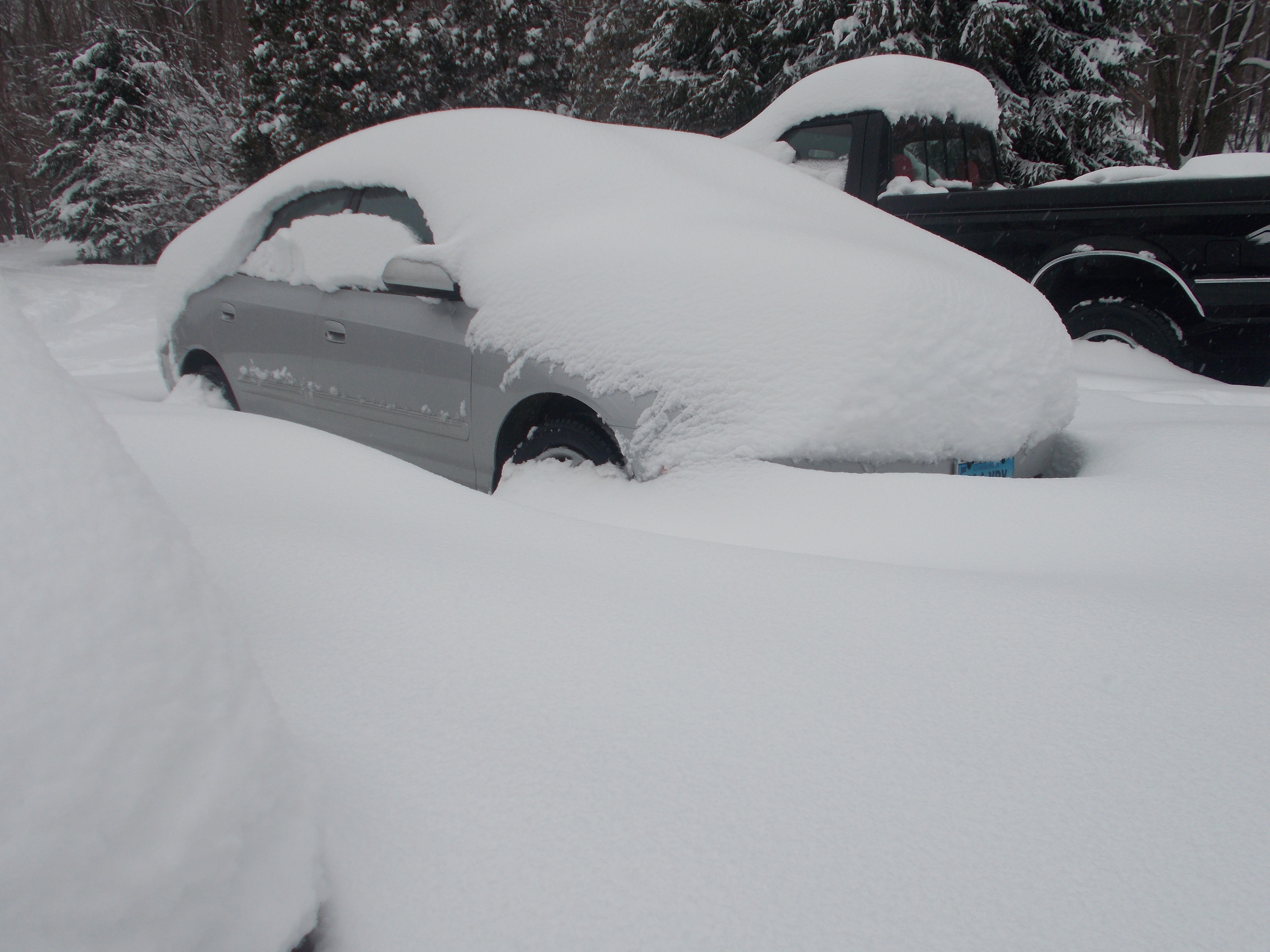
Aftermath of the March 2013 nor'easter in Ashford, Connecticut

The Chesapeake Bay Bridge was closed in both directions during the day Wednesday due to wind gusts of up to 60 mph. More than 1,900 flights were canceled March 6, raising to almost 4,100 the number of flights that have been canceled since the storm began according to flight tracker FlightStats. The storm dropped up to 10 inches of snow in the Chicago area on March 5. In the evening of March 6, Hatteras, North Carolina reported 3 feet of water on Highway 12 with the road impassable. Despite a forecast of 5-10 inches of snow, most of the Washington DC metro area was spared. On March 5, the federal government closed offices in Washington, D.C. The White House canceled a planned celebration for the Alabama Crimson Tide and Congress called off several hearings. More than 954,000 students who attend major school districts in Washington, Virginia, Maryland and Ohio got the day off. Amtrak shut down some trains in Washington, Virginia, West Virginia and New York. Some snow totals from March 6 according to AccuWeather.com were: Frostburg, Maryland: 12.5"; New Kensington, Pennsylvania: 12.0"; Charlottesville, Virginia: 14.5"; Worcester, Massachusetts 20.8 inches; Auburn, Massachusetts 19 inches; Randolph, Massachusetts:24.1 inches and Franklin, West Virginia: 24.0". More than 440 flights were canceled on March 7, according to FlightAware.com. New York City was expected to get up to 3 inches of snow by the morning of March 8 with some higher total amounts possible on eastern Long Island. Boston was expected to see 2 to 4 inches, with higher totals where a winter storm warning was issued from Worcester to just north of Providence. Winter warnings were posted in seven Northeast states with most snowfall to occur on March 8. On March 7, the NWS in Boston recorded 10.2" of snow, breaking the single-day mark set in 1941. The city ended with 13.1 inches of snow. The Blue Hill Meteorological Observatory in Massachusetts measured 29.8 inches of snow over a 36-hour period. Because the storm's wind area was so large, rough surf and rip currents were felt all the way southward towards the eastern coast of Florida over the weekend of March 9 and 10.

The snowfall totals in many areas of southern New England vastly exceeded what was expected from forecasts, which meant that many people were unprepared for a large storm. Most television meteorologists in Boston had predicted only a few inches of snow and mostly rain, but this forecast failed miserably. Many towns surrounding Boston received around two feet of snow, which greatly surprised residents. Boston schools were left in session as the height of the storm occurred since they did not know the gravity of the situation.

=== Snowfall totals ===
Montana

- Highest snowfall total was 36 inches near Bear Paw Ski Area outside of Rocky Boy in the north-central area.
- Drifts of 5 to 7 feet were reported northwest of Carlyle in Wibaux County where 12 inches of snow fell.

Wyoming

- Highest snowfall totals were 2 inches near New Haven and Rockypoint in northeast Wyoming.

Colorado

- Highest snowfall total was 14 inches at Gothic.
- The official Denver snowfall total was 2.0 inches at Denver International Airport.

North Dakota

- Highest snowfall total was 18 inches at the Canada border entry station northeast of Sarles.
- Drifts of 3 to 5 feet were reported in Grand Forks County, near the town of Gilby.
- Officially 7.6 inches of snow at the National Weather Service office in Grand Forks.

South Dakota

- Highest snowfall total was 5 inches at Lead, South Dakota located in the Black Hills.

Minnesota

- Highest snowfall was 13.2 inches at Bigfork in northern Minnesota. As much as 11.8 inches at Winona in the southeast part of the state.
- The official Twin Cities snowfall was 9.3 inches at Minneapolis-St. Paul International Airport.

Iowa

- Highest snowfall was 8.6 inches at New Hampton.

Wisconsin

- Highest snowfall was 10.0 inches near Frenchville.
- The official snowfall amount in Madison was 6.4 inches at Madison Truax Airport.
- The official snowfall amount in Milwaukee was 4.3 inches at General Mitchell International Airport.

Illinois

- Highest snowfall was 11.1 inches in Streator.
- The official snowfall amount in Chicago was 9.2 inches at O'Hare International Airport.

Michigan

- Highest snowfall was 10.8 inches in Saint Joseph.

Indiana

- Highest snowfall was 11.9 inches in North Webster with drifts to 30 inches.
- The official snowfall amount in Indianapolis was 3.7 inches at Indianapolis International Airport.

Ohio

- Highest snowfall was 10 inches in Quincy and Bellefontaine.
- The official snowfall amount in Columbus was 7 inches at Port Columbus Airport.

Kentucky

- Highest snowfall was 4.5 inches at Florence and near Walton.
- The official snowfall amount of 4.3 inches at Cincinnati/Northern Kentucky International Airport near Covington.

Pennsylvania

- Highest snowfall was 12 inches in New Kensington, Sarver and Murrysville.

Maryland

- Highest snowfall was 14 inches at Swanton.

Washington, D.C.

- Highest snowfall was 1 inch near the extreme southern tip of the District.

Virginia

- Highest snowfall was 20.3 inches at Fisherville.
- Official totals of 1.5 inches at the airport in Richmond, 3.3 inches at Dulles International Airport and 0.2 inches at Reagan National Airport.

West Virginia

- Highest snowfall was 24 inches near Franklin.

North Carolina

- Highest snowfall was 8 inches at Buladean and near Maggie Valley.

Tennessee

- Highest snowfall was 6 inches near Townsend and at Sams Gap in Pisgah National Forest.

Georgia

- Highest snowfall was 4 inches on Brasstown Bald in the north Georgia mountains.

Connecticut

- Highest snowfall total was 23 inches in Staffordville, Connecticut.
- 18.5 inches reported in Manchester, Connecticut
- 18 inches reported in Ashford, Connecticut

Rhode Island

- Highest snowfall total was 12.3 inches in North Cumberland, Rhode Island.

Massachusetts

- Highest snowfall was 29.8 inches at Blue Hills Observatory in Milton, Massachusetts
- Official total of 22.8 inches in Worcester, Massachusetts

New Hampshire

- Highest snowfall total was 16 inches in Pelham, New Hampshire

=== Fatalities ===
Weather-related traffic accidents account for at least 8 deaths, 5 in the Midwest and 3 in Virginia. The 67-foot fishing vessel, Seafarer, capsized on March 6, 2013 about 15 miles east of Assateague Island with 3 men on board. Two men remain missing after the Coast Guard called off the search on March 7, 2013.

== See also ==
- November 2012 nor'easter
- February 2013 North American blizzard
- February 2014 nor'easter
- March 2014 nor'easter
- January 2015 North American blizzard
