= November 2012 nor'easter =

Weather event in North America

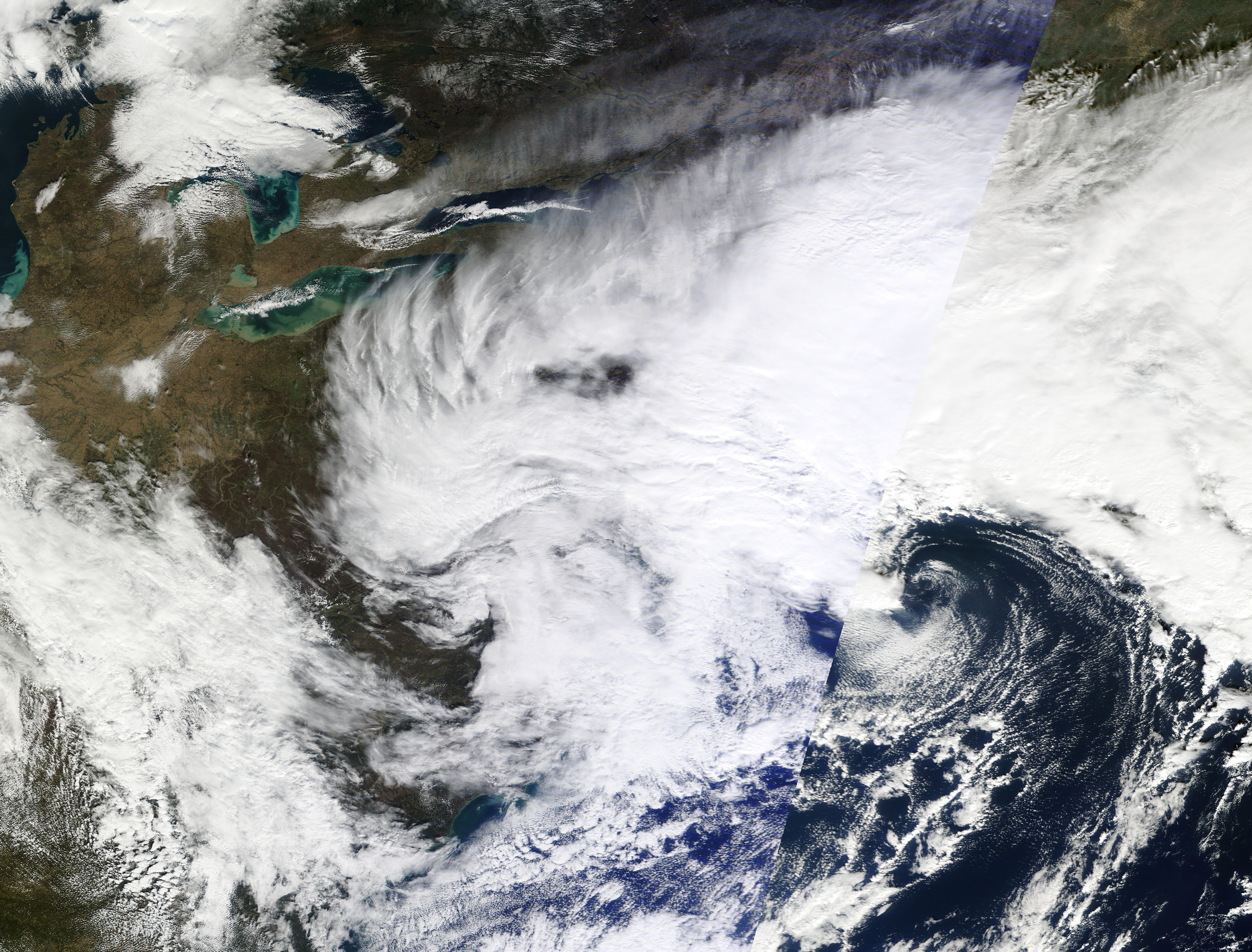
- The nor'easter on November 7, 2012 (UTC)

Meteorological history
- Formed: November 6, 2012
- Dissipated: November 10, 2012

Extratropical cyclone
- Lowest pressure: 984 hPa (mbar); 29.06 inHg
- Max. snowfall: 13.5 in (34 cm) in Monroe and Clintonville, Connecticut

Overall effects
- Fatalities: 4 total
- Areas affected: Southeastern United States, Northeastern United States, Eastern Canada, Bermuda
- Power outages: >43,000
- Part of the 2012–13 North American winter

The November 2012 nor'easter was a powerful nor'easter that brought significant early season snow to the Northeastern United States. Many of the areas hit by the storm had been affected by Hurricane Sandy days before, which further complicated recovery efforts.

== Meteorological history ==
Map plotting the storm's track and intensity, according to the Saffir–Simpson scale Map key Saffir–Simpson scale Tropical depression (≤38 mph, ≤62 km/h) Tropical storm (39–73 mph, 63–118 km/h) Category 1 (74–95 mph, 119–153 km/h) Category 2 (96–110 mph, 154–177 km/h) Category 3 (111–129 mph, 178–208 km/h) Category 4 (130–156 mph, 209–251 km/h) Category 5 (≥157 mph, ≥252 km/h) Unknown Storm type Tropical cyclone Subtropical cyclone Extratropical cyclone, remnant low, tropical disturbance, or monsoon depression

A mid-level shortwave over the Midwestern United States was moving eastward on November 6, just four days after Hurricane Sandy dissipated, toward a trough over the Southeastern United States, and into an area with abundant moisture and favorable conditions from the jet stream. The combination was favorable for a nor'easter to form, and on November 7, a strong low pressure area developed along the coast of North Carolina. At the time, there was an area of cold air inland the Mid-Atlantic States and New England that would allow the precipitation to fall as snow. By November 8, the system drifting to the northeast, located about 90 mi (140 km) south-southeast of Boston, Massachusetts, with a front extending northeastward to Nova Scotia. Its large circulation dropped rain and snow across the northeastern United States. Some areas within NYC, got close to a foot of snow across Western Long Island, including Eastern Queens County in a narrow snow band that set up because of the coastal front.

== Preparation and Impact ==
Immediately after Hurricane Sandy made landfall, forecasters were already discussing the possibility of a nor'easter directly impacting New Jersey during the following week. In preparation for the storm, coastal areas of New Jersey, New York, and Connecticut were advised to evacuate, with parts of Islip, New York, were under a mandatory evacuation. Before the nor'easter struck, officials recommended residents in low-lying areas of New York City to evacuate, A portion of the Long Island Expressway was closed during the storm, and the Long Island Rail Road shut down, with Penn Station not allowing people to enter. All state parks on Long Island were closed on November 7 and 8th, with some remaining closed afterwards due to damage from Hurricane Sandy. Airlines canceled over 1,300 flights in or out of New York airports. Parks in New York City were closed, and construction was halted. In Nassau County, New York, more than 140 trucks put sand and salt on roads. Schools were closed in Connecticut. Due to sufficiently cool air and steady snowfall, the National Weather Service issued a winter storm warning. The New York Red Bulls had to postpone a Major League Soccer tournament game due to the snow.

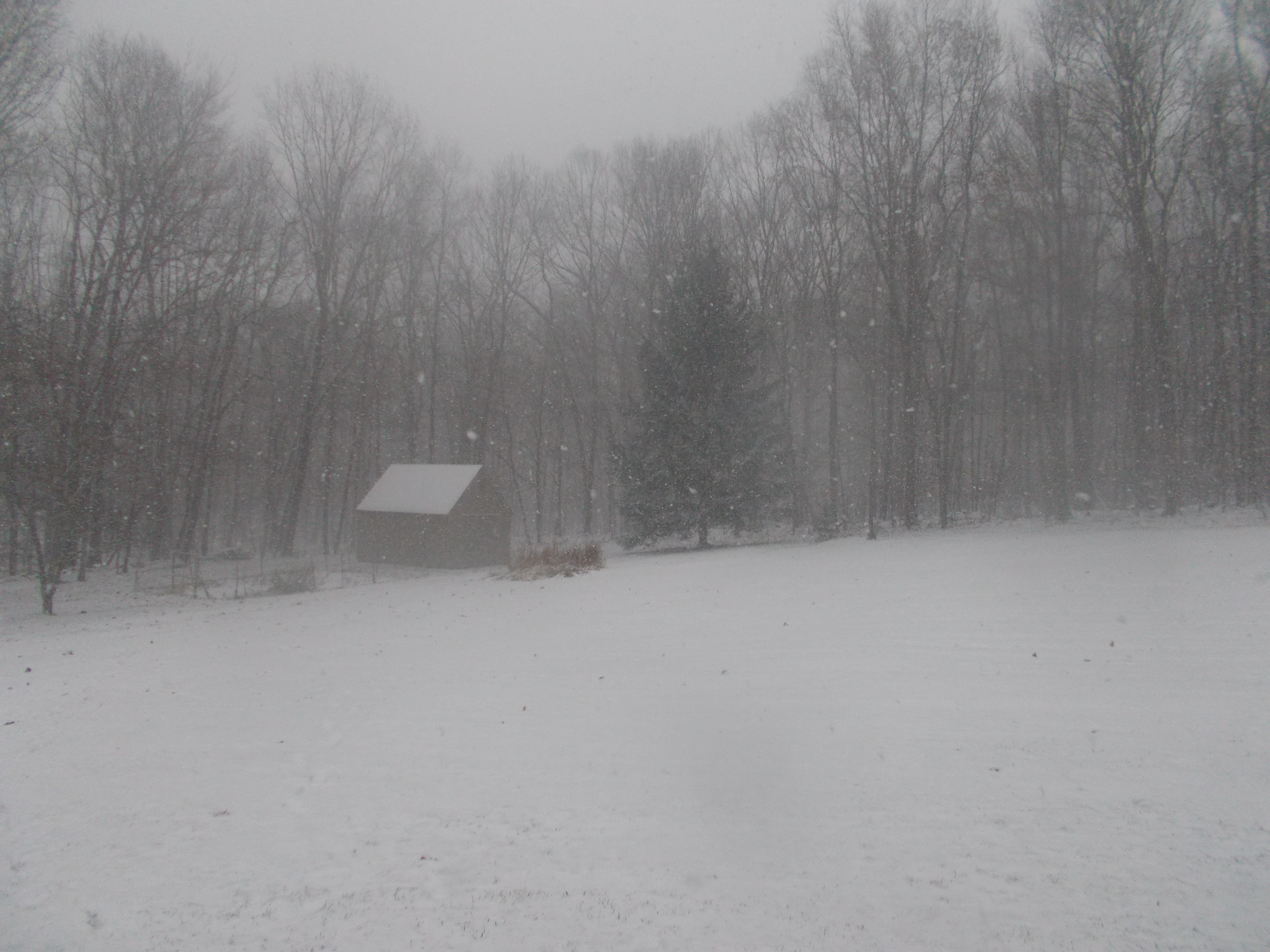
Snowfall during the November 2012 nor'easter in Ashford, Connecticut

Across New Jersey and New York, the storm dropped rain and snow in areas that sustained significant damage from Hurricane Sandy about ten days prior. Snowfall spread from New Jersey to Maine, peaking at 13.5 in (34 cm) in Clintonville, Connecticut, and the highest associated rainfall total was 2.28 in (5.8 cm) near Kingston, Massachusetts. Snowfall in Central Park reached 4.7 in (12 cm), which broke the daily record and also the record for the earliest date of more than 4 in (10 cm) at the location. A daily snowfall record was also broken in Newark, New Jersey, with a total of 2 in (5.1 cm), while Bridgeport, Connecticut set a record for their biggest November snowstorm on record, with 8 in (20 cm). The nor'easter also produced strong winds that peaked at 65 mph (105 km/h) in Fairhaven, Massachusetts. High winds downed trees that were weakened by Sandy, some of which fell onto power lines. About 50,000 people lost power in the two states who had previously lost power after the hurricane. Along the coast, the storm produced 8 ft (2.4 m) waves, and coastal roads were flooded. There were two traffic deaths in Connecticut that were related to the storm.

On November 8 as of 9 a.m. EST, around 715,000 eastern U.S. homes and businesses were without power. This is an increase of nearly 43,000 from 12 hours earlier, due to the effects of the storm. There were 167,000 power outages in New Jersey alone, and at least 50,000 on Long Island.

At 6 a.m. EST on November 9, about 265,000 New Jersey homes and businesses were without power because of Sandy and the nor'easter.

== Name ==
The Weather Channel dubbed this storm as "Winter Storm Athena," but this name was not acknowledged by the National Weather Service. In response to the naming system, the National Weather Service announced on November 7, 2012, that it would not recognize the Weather Channel's names for winter storms, stating in a press release that "it does not use the name of winter storms in its products."

== See also ==
- Hurricane Sandy
- February 2013 nor'easter
- March 2013 nor'easter
