= 2012–13 North American winter =

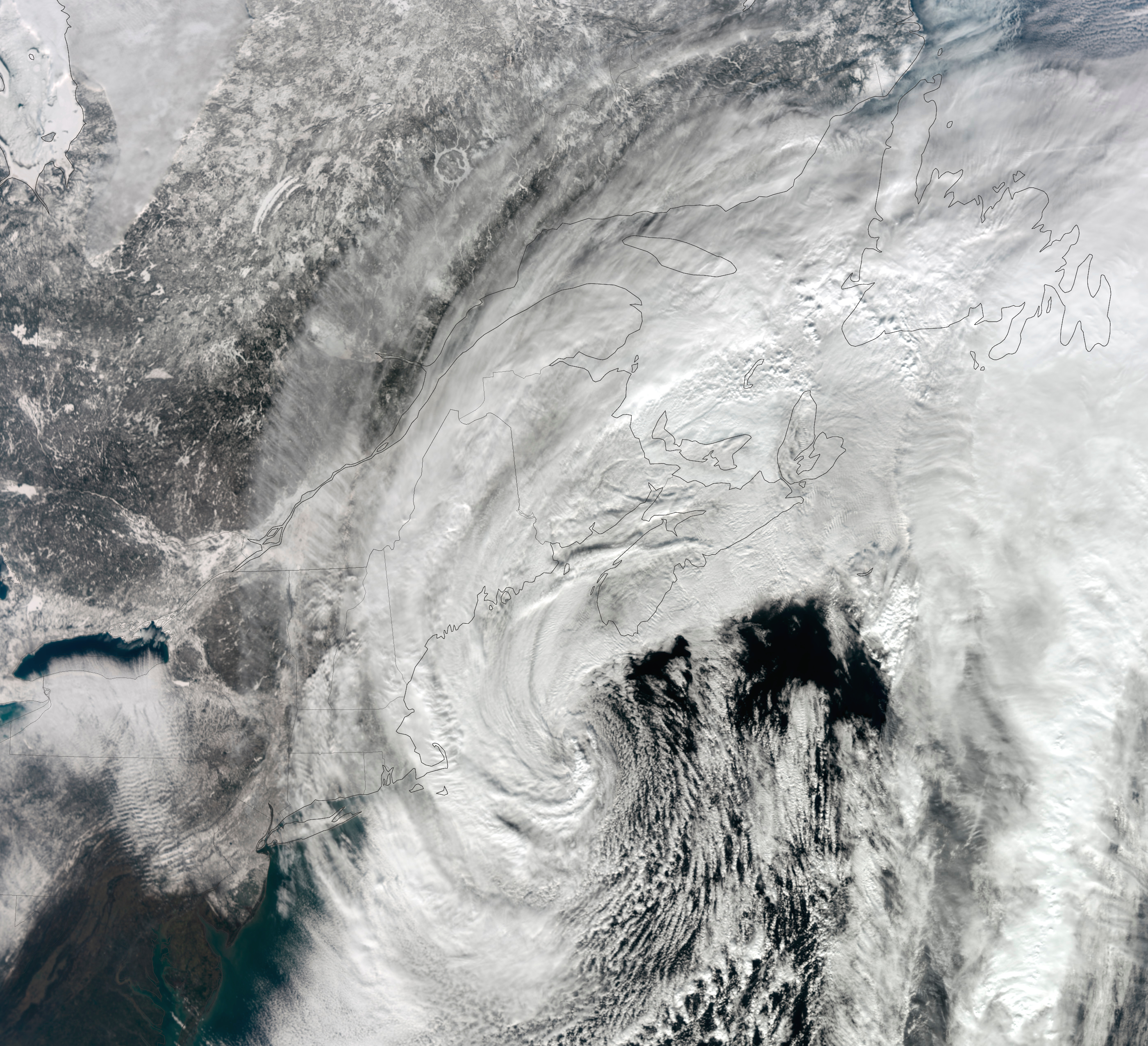
- NASA satellite image of a strong nor'easter over New England on February 9, 2013

Seasonal boundaries
- Meteorological winter: December 1 – February 28
- Astronomical winter: December 21 – March 20
- First event started: October 29, 2012
- Last event concluded: May 26, 2013

Most notable event
- Name: February 2013 North American blizzard
  - Duration: February 7–10, 2013
  - Lowest pressure: 968 mb (28.59 inHg)
  - Fatalities: 18 total
  - Damage: >$100 million (2013 USD)

Seasonal statistics
- Total WPC-issued storms: 21 total (Note: Includes Post-Tropical Cyclone Sandy’s WPC handoff as noted in their season summary)
- Rated storms (RSI) (Cat. 1+): 19 total
- Major storms (RSI) (Cat. 3+): 4 total
- Maximum snowfall accumulation: 40 in (100 cm) in Hamden, Connecticut (February 7–10, 2013)
- Total fatalities: 69 total
- Total damage: >$850 million (2013 USD)

Related articles
- Weather of 2012

The 2012–13 North American winter was a very active winter weather season by metric of the amount of storms rated on the Regional Snowfall Index (RSI), with 19 storms being rated on the scale. The season started out somewhat early, as the remnants of Hurricane Sandy brought heavy snow to the mountains of West Virginia in late October. Later, a strong nor'easter affected the weary Northeastern United States, hampering storm recovery efforts and dropping several inches of snow. The rest of the winter featured several other notable events, such as a Christmas winter storm that affected most of the Eastern United States, and the most notable event occurring in early February, when a powerful blizzard struck the Northeast and brought record snow to some areas. Overall, the majority of the continent, more specifically the central parts of the United States, experienced a persistently wintry and cold pattern that extended into the months of April and May, a theme that would be repeated the following winter on a larger and more widespread scale. During the winter, a weak El Nino was expected to influence weather conditions across the continent.

While there is no well-agreed-upon date used to indicate the start of winter in the Northern Hemisphere, there are two definitions of winter which may be used. Based on the astronomical definition, winter begins at the winter solstice, which in 2012 occurred late on December 21, and ends at the March equinox, which in 2013 occurred on March 20. Based on the meteorological definition, the first day of winter is December 1 and the last day February 28. Both definitions involve a period of approximately three months, with some variability. However, winter storms can occur outside of these limits, as shown by the very late winter storms that occurred throughout the months of April and even early May in parts of the central U.S.

== Seasonal forecasts ==
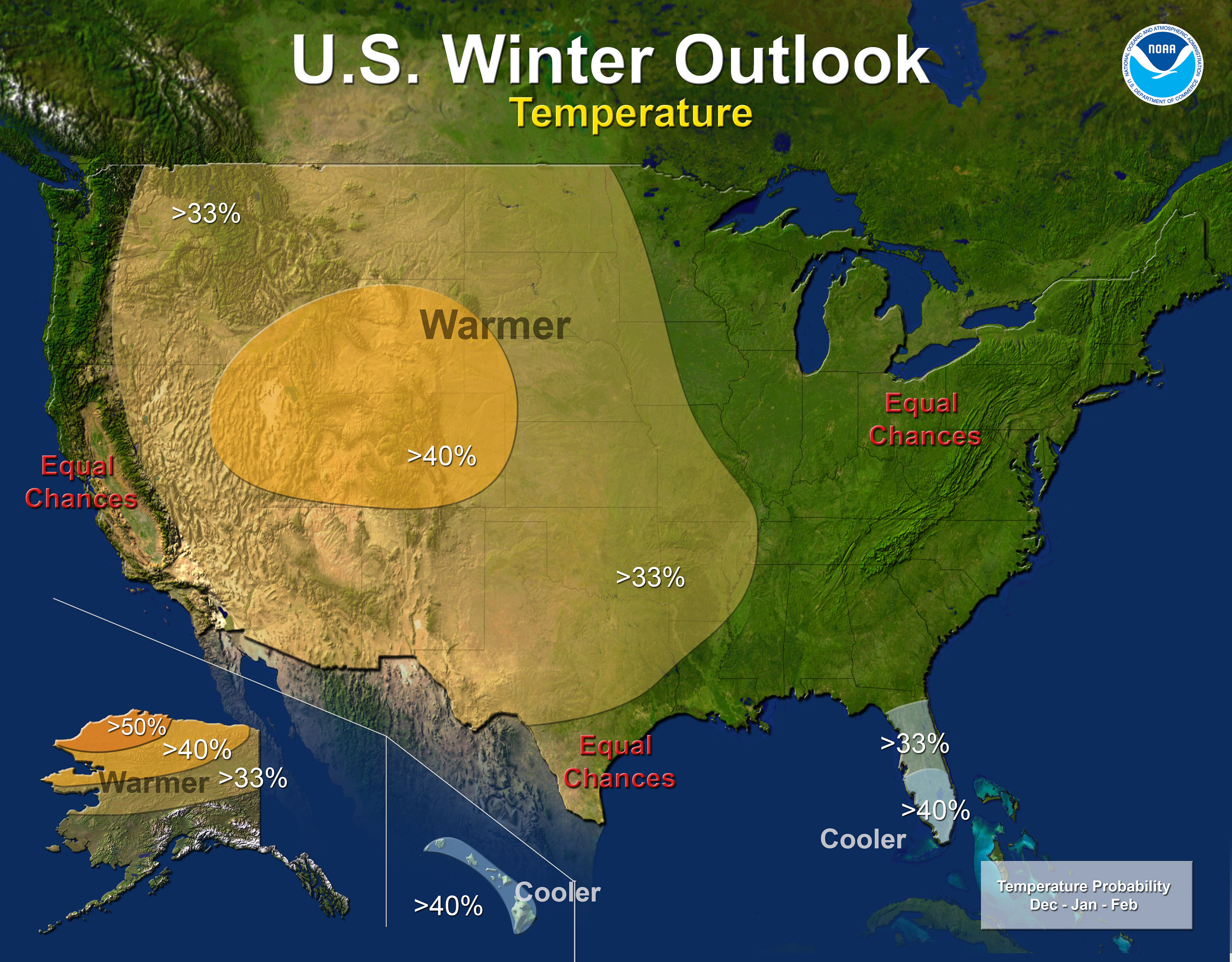
Temperature outlook

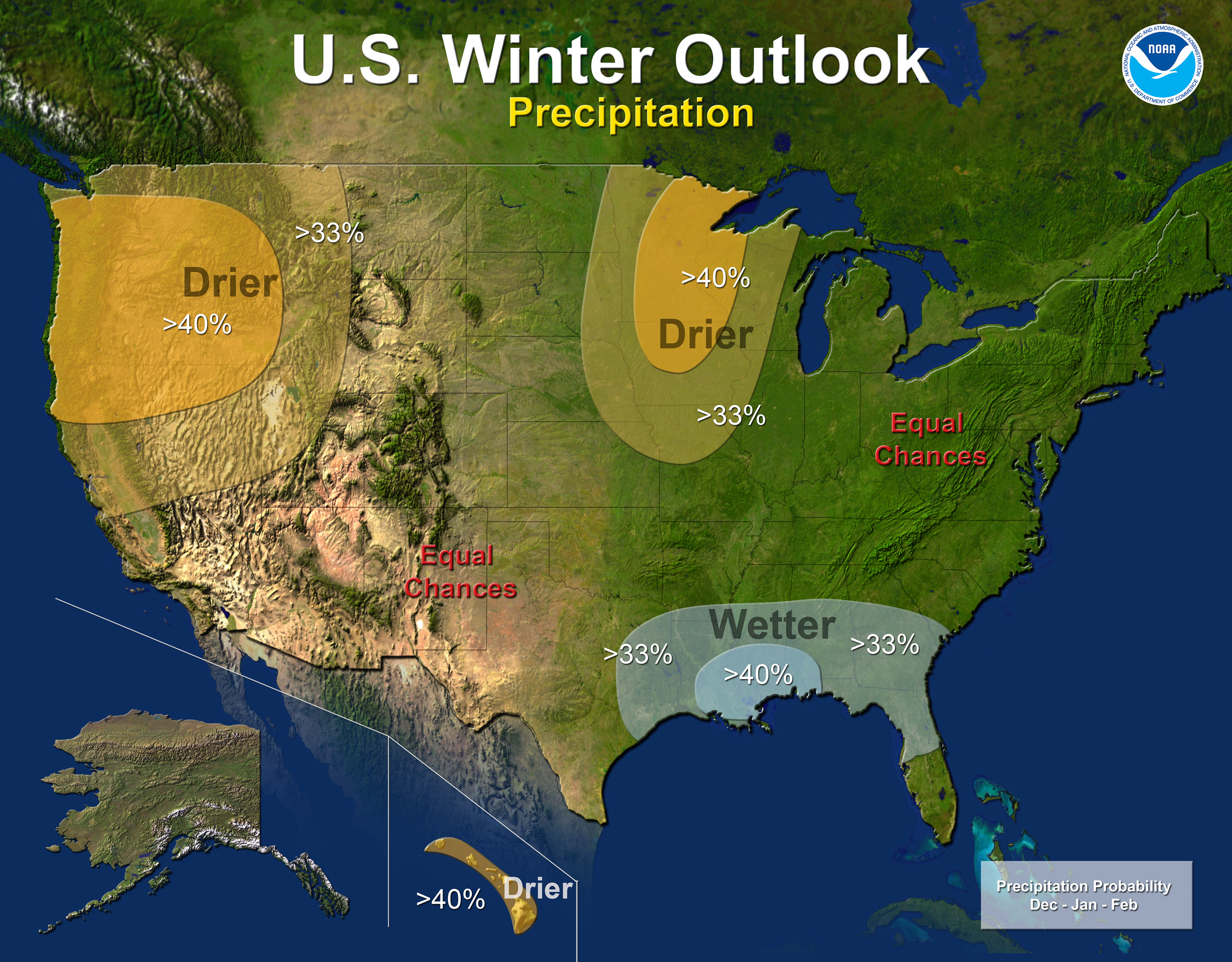
Precipitation outlook

On October 18, 2012, the National Oceanic and Atmospheric Administration's Climate Prediction Center issued its U.S. Winter Outlook. In the outlook, little rainfall was anticipated in the Northwestern United States and the Upper Midwest, while above-average precipitation was anticipated in the Southeastern United States. Equal levels of precipitation and temperatures were expected in the Alaskan panhandle. Below-average temperatures were favored in Florida, while above-average temperatures were favored in much of the Western United States, and northern Alaska. The remainder of the country fell into the outlook's "equal chance" category, with an equal chance of above-average, below-average, and near-average temperatures and/or precipitation.

== Events ==
=== Post-Tropical Cyclone Sandy ===
- Category 0 "Nuisance" (RSI/NOAA: N/A)
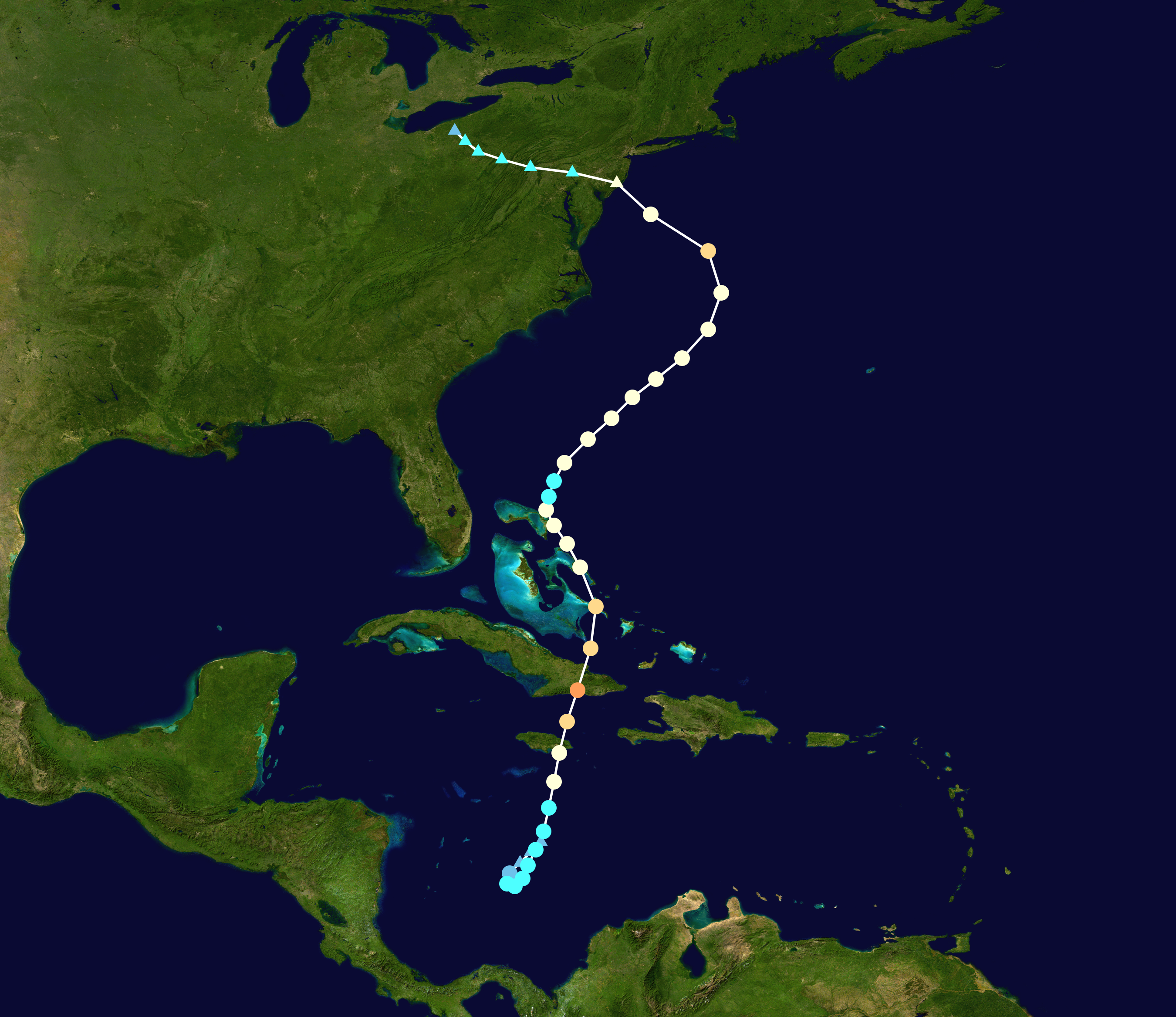
- Duration: October 29 – October 31, 2012
- Lowest pressure: 945 mb (27.91 inHg)
- Maximum snow: 36 in (91 cm)
- Fatalities: 7 winter-related fatalities

On October 29, 2012, Hurricane Sandy made landfall in southern New Jersey as an 80 mph (130 km/h) Category 1 post-tropical cyclone. While initially bringing historic storm surge, damaging winds and heavy rainfall, due the cold air nearby in Canada, the cyclone (dubbed a 'super'storm by many news outlets and sources) was able to produce snow in its massive circulation. The snowstorm portion of the hurricane dumped as much as 28 inches (71 cm) of snow in the higher terrains of West Virginia and northern Virginia. This set an October record for most snowfall at Mount LeConte.

Meteorologists assume the reason why Sandy was able to produce such a snowstorm was due to a blast of arctic air – associated with the polar vortex – that had plunged into the Northeast, which led to Sandy actually maintaining its intensity while subsequently deepening before landfall. Seven fatalities were attributed to the snowstorm from Sandy. About a week later, the same areas affected by Sandy were impacted by an early season nor'easter, further hindering recovery efforts in those areas.

=== Early November nor'easter ===
- Category 0 "Nuisance" (RSI/NOAA: N/A)
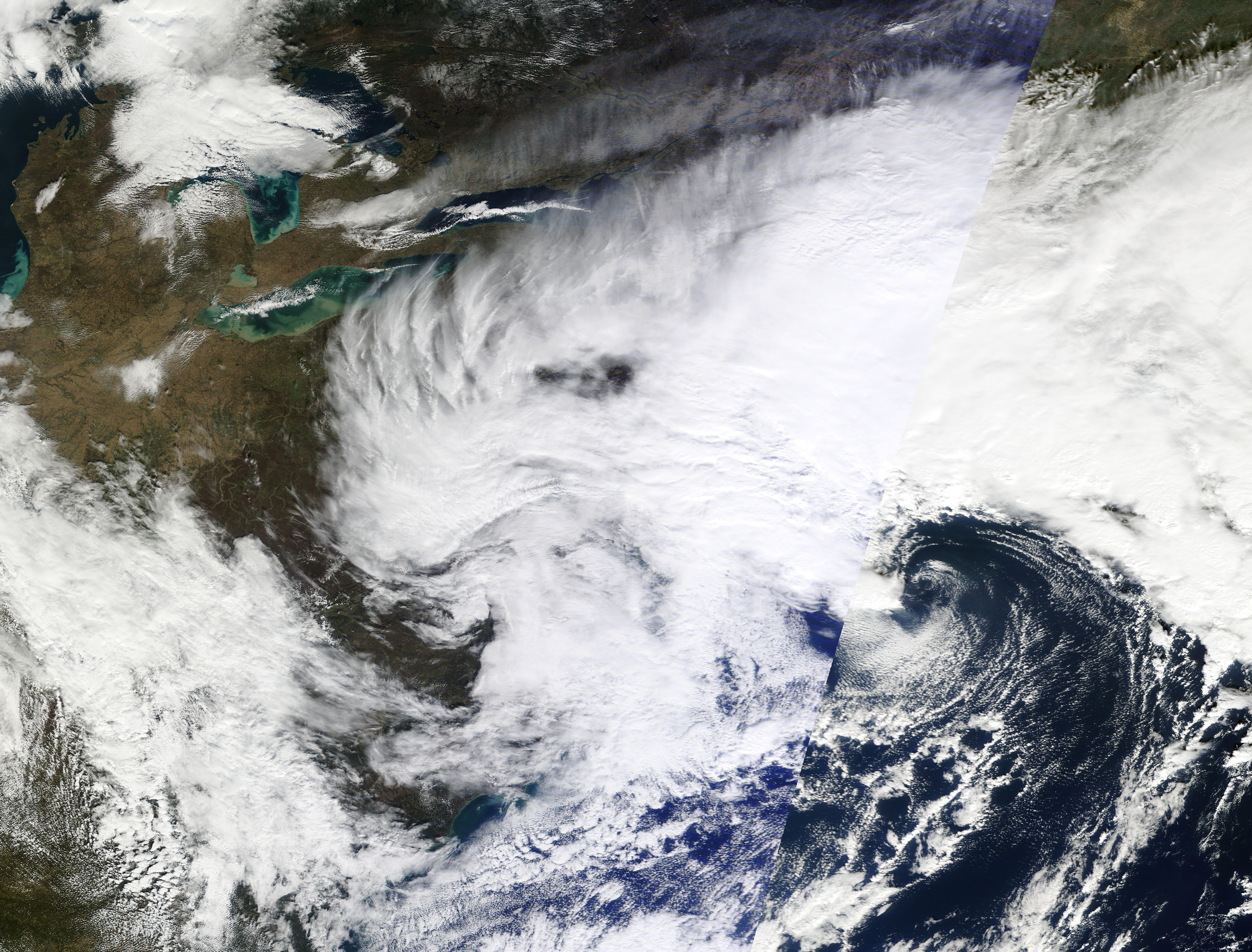
- Duration: November 7 – November 10, 2012
- Lowest pressure: 984 mb (29.06 inHg)
- Maximum snow: 13.5 in (34 cm)
- Fatalities: 4 fatalities

Less than a week after Hurricane Sandy impacted the Northeastern United States, the same areas affected by the cyclone experienced an early season snowstorm on November 7–8. Development began when an area of low pressure formed in the Central United States on November 5. Moving eastward, the disturbance moved off the coast late on November 6, and began to take a more northernly track, slowly strengthening as it did so. Early on November 7, rainbands began affecting the New York metropolitan area, however, due to the cold air that was in place over Canada near the U.S–Canada border, snow began to break out on the storm's western side, directly over the state of New Jersey. Snowfall rates approached 1–2 inches (2.5–5.1 cm) in some areas. Coastal flooding was also a threat, in nearly the same areas that were devastated by coastal flooding from Sandy. It finally moved away from the coast on November 8, leaving more damage in its wake and snowfall totals peaking at around 14 inches (36 cm).

=== Mid-December blizzard ===
- Category 2 "Significant" (RSI/NOAA: 3.349)
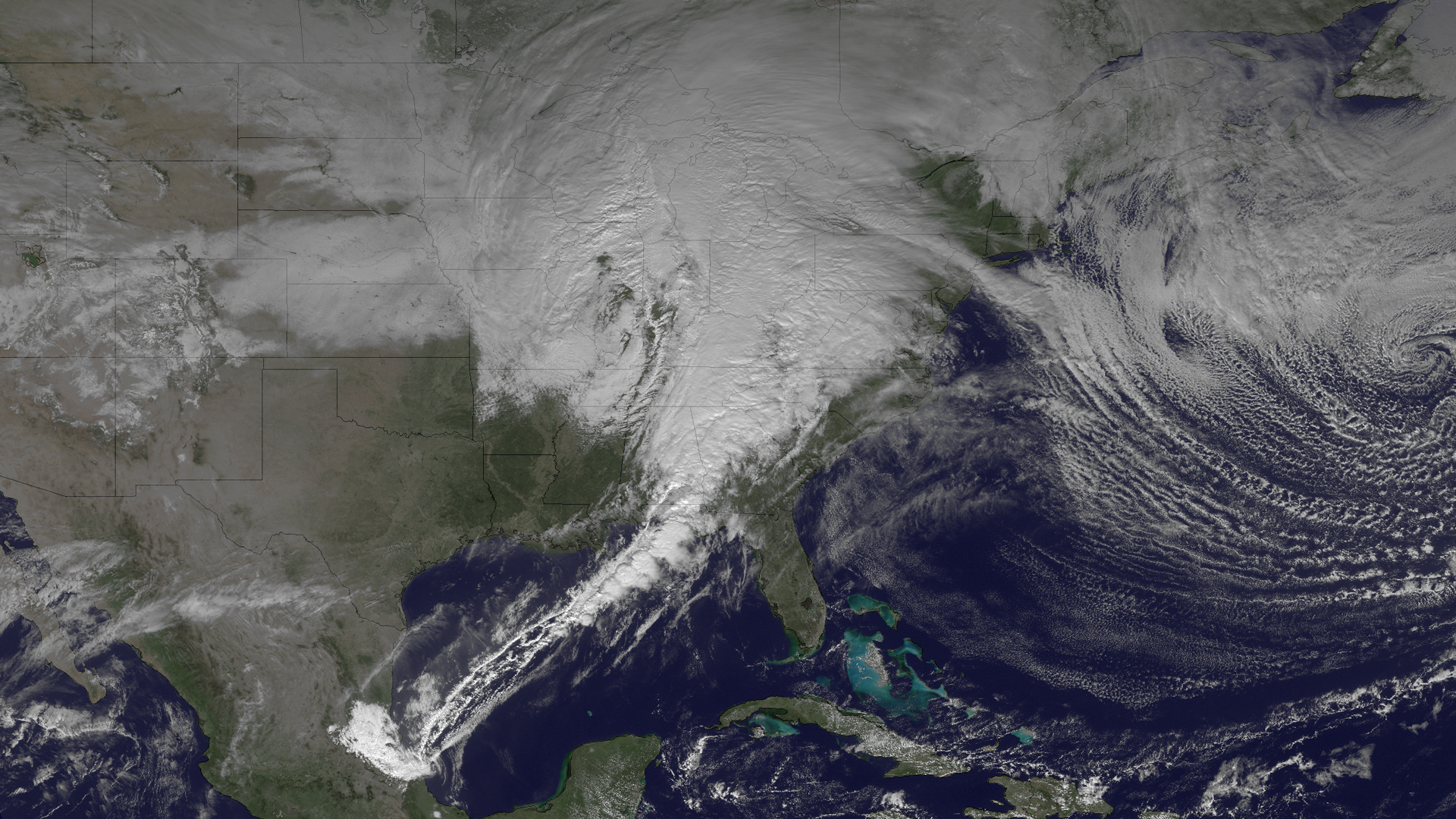
- Duration: December 17 – December 22, 2012
- Lowest pressure: 971 mb (28.67 inHg)
- Maximum snow: 15.2 in (39 cm)
- Fatalities: 6 fatalities

Around the beginning of winter, a potent blizzard moved across the Upper Midwest into the Ohio Valley, dumping as much as 15 inches (38 cm). On December 17, an upper-level shortwave and associated trough made landfall along the coast of the Pacific Northwest. The system initially moved towards the southeast, strengthening over the Rocky Mountains. This led to the development and formation of a surface low over eastern Colorado early on December 19. The low began to curve towards the northeast, and its barometric pressure began to deepen. The low attained its lowest pressure at 1800 UTC on December 20 over northern Illinois. However, the system became occluded, and as such moved quickly to the northeast, where it weakened and subsequently dissipated over southern Ontario late on December 21. Another low pressure area formed in the vicinity of the previous low over the East Coast of the United States, which quickly moved north across the coast, bringing heavy snowfalls to the region. The low later exited the continental United States on December 22. During the next several days, the winter storm drifted northeastward, and eventually to the south of Greenland, before finally being absorbed by another more powerful extratropical cyclone just south of Iceland, on December 29.

=== Christmas Day storm complex ===
- Category 1 "Notable" (RSI/NOAA: 2.005)
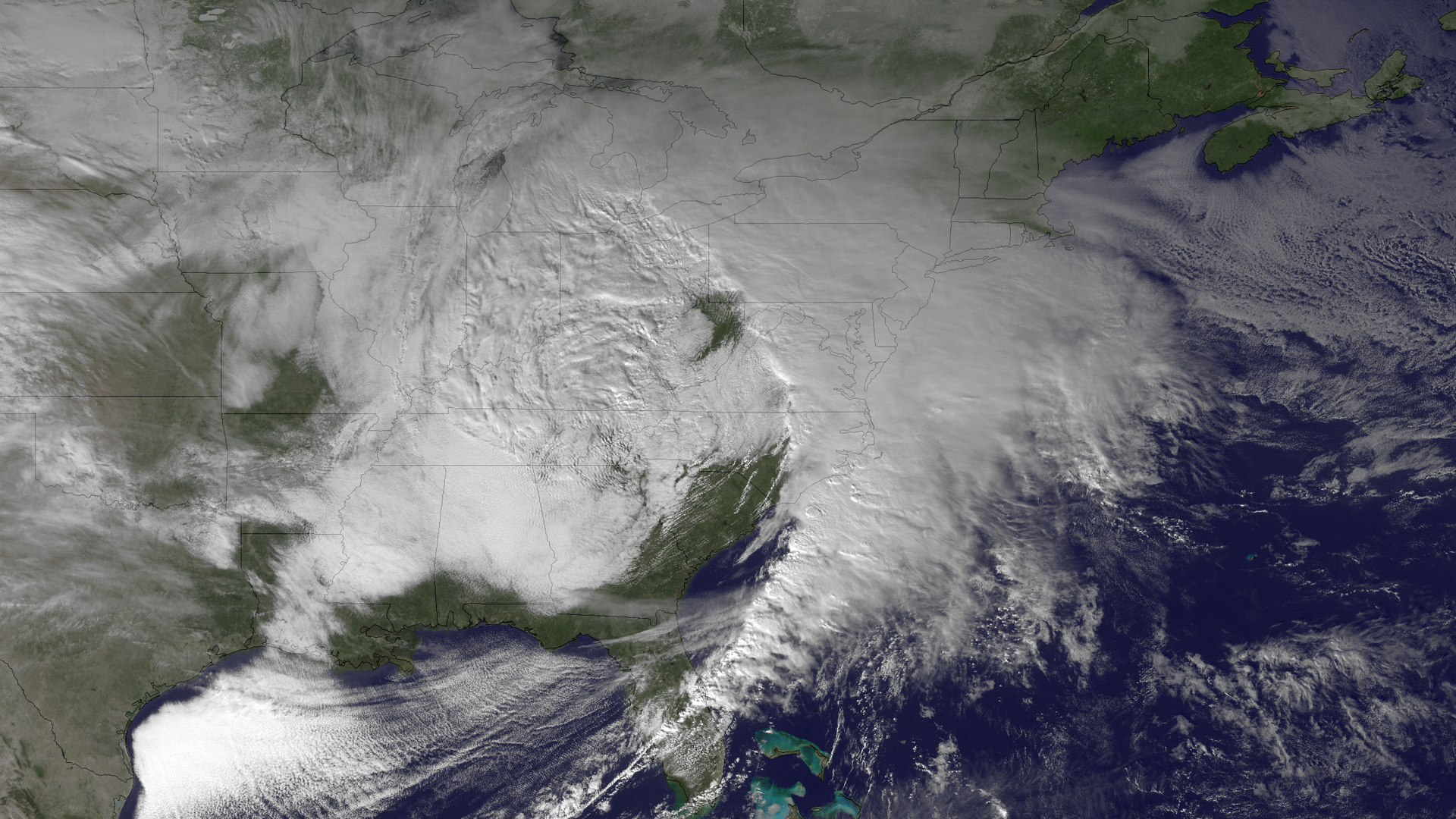
- Duration: December 25 – December 28, 2012
- Lowest pressure: 968 mb (28.59 inHg)
- Maximum snow: 27 in (69 cm)
- Fatalities: 16 fatalities
- Damage: > $150 million (2012 USD)

On Christmas Day, one of the largest Christmas tornado outbreaks occurred. A large line of thunderstorms suddenly erupted in eastern Texas early on December 25, with a few immediately becoming supercells. Tornadoes began to develop, causing damage to areas in Louisiana, Mississippi, all the way to the Outer Banks (threat began to decline as the squall line approached the area), with at least three being EF3s (one was a long-tracked tornado), and eight being EF2s. Other tornadoes were reported through December 25–26, causing up to more than US$1 million in damages. The storm complex also produced a strong blizzard, with strong winds and snowfall accumulations from 6–18 inches (15–46 cm) in an area stretching from northern Texas all the way to Maine. The system moved out by December 29, as another winter storm began to affect the Northeast.

=== January cold wave ===
A cold wave in the United States was influenced by a low-pressure area called a "Clipper" which brought an Arctic cold front that caused rapidly falling temperatures and strong northwest winds with gusts of 35–50 miles per hour (56–80 km/h).

=== Early February blizzard ===
- Category 3 "Major" (RSI/NOAA: 9.21)
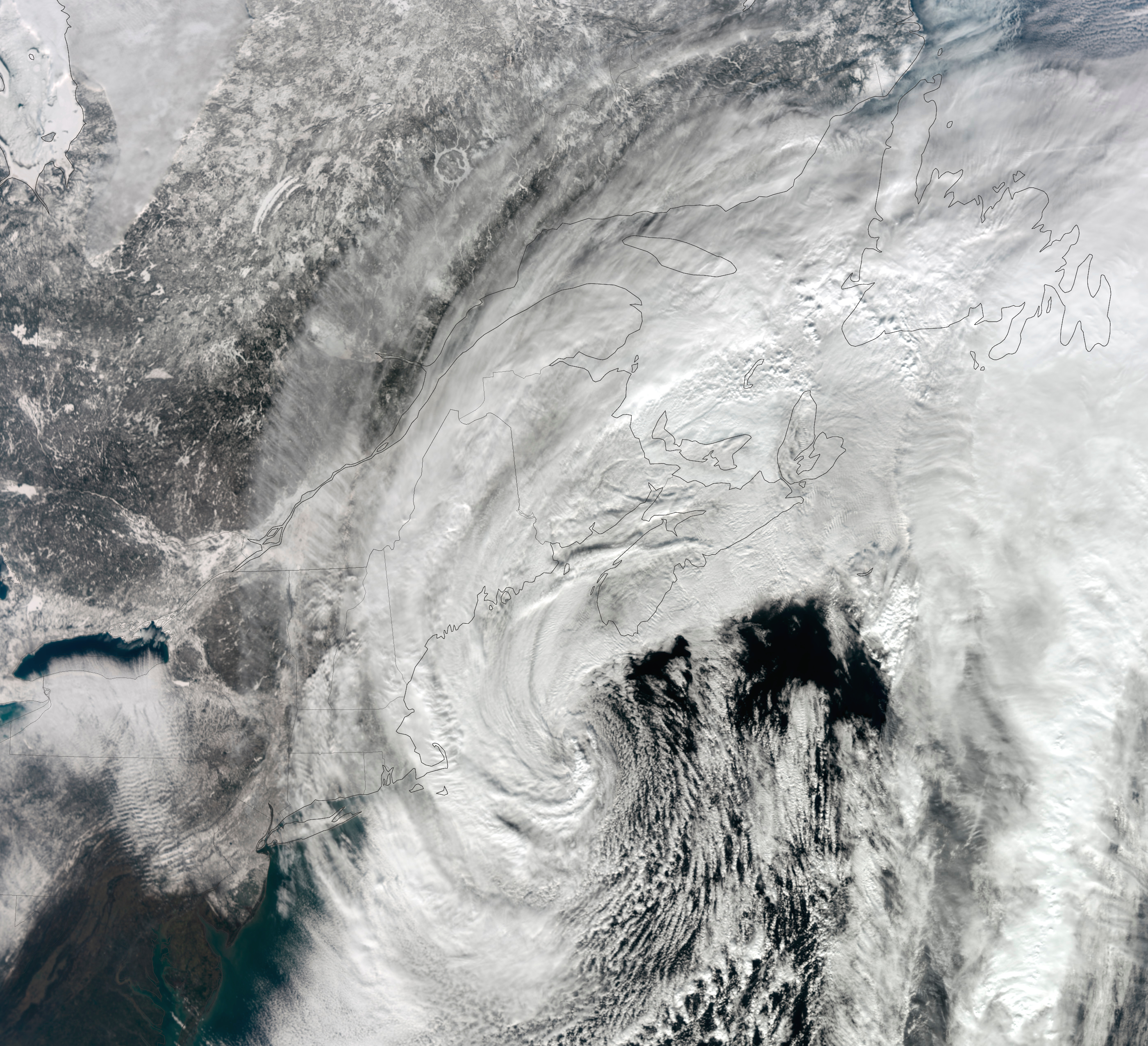
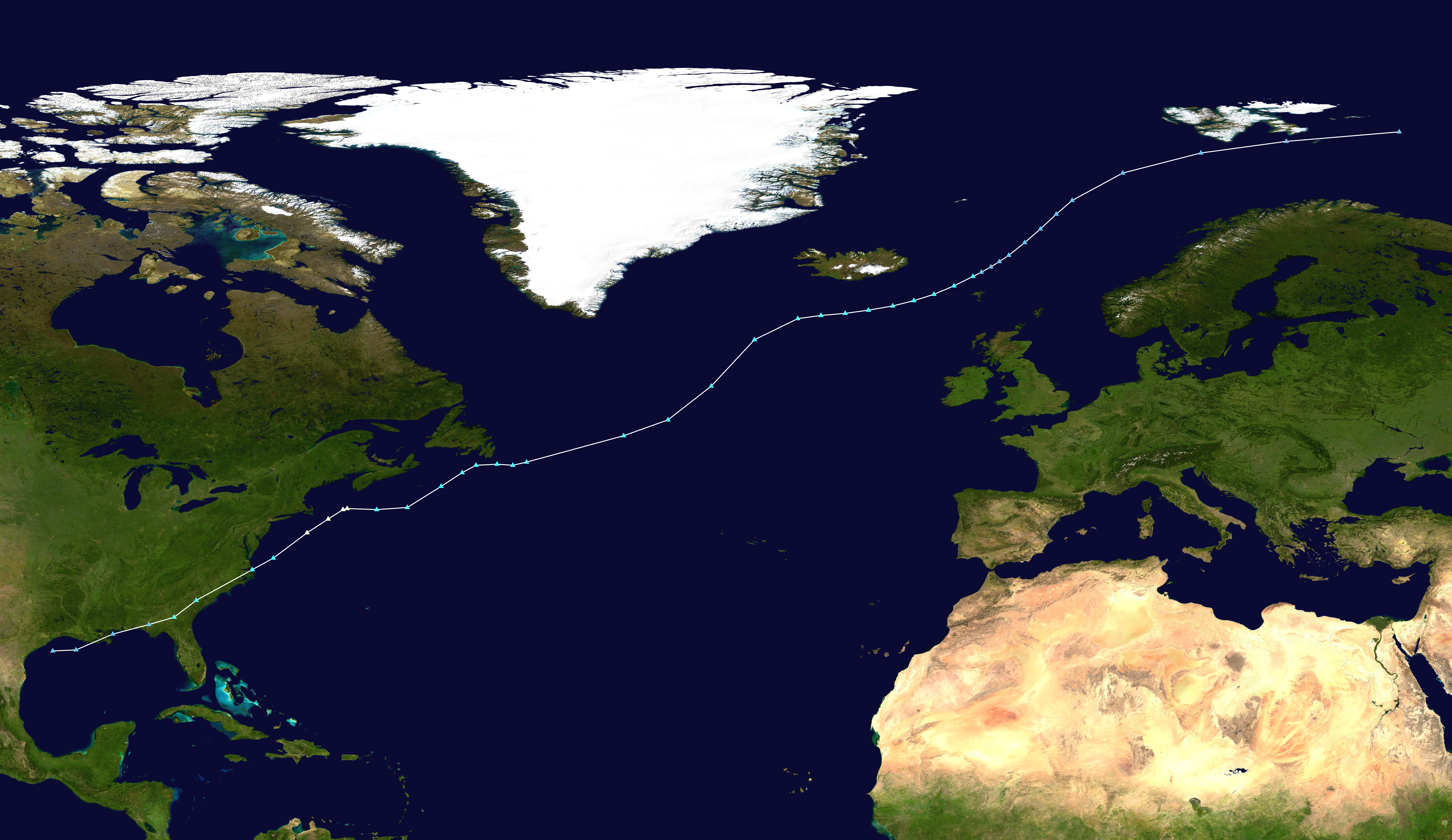
- Duration: February 7 – February 10, 2013
- Lowest pressure: 968 mb (28.59 inHg)
- Maximum snow: 40 in (100 cm)
- Fatalities: 16 fatalities
- Damage: $100 million (2013 USD)

A major blizzard affected much of the Northeast on February 8–9. The nor'easter dropped up to as much as a little over 3 feet (36 in) of snowfall, specifically near Long Island and Connecticut, causing major headaches. Originating from the merger of two areas of low pressure, with the latter being the dominant low of the storm, it moved up the East Coast, and when just offshore of New Jersey, an intense band of precipitation formed. This particular band persisted for more than eight hours, creating snowfall rates of up to 3 inches (7.6 cm) per hour over Long Island, which was where the heaviest snow accumulations fell. The system continued to produce heavy snow and wind before finally moving away from the coast late on February 9. Connecticut set a 24 hour snowfall record at 36 inches (91 cm). The storm also received names such as Winter Storm Nemo, Blizzard of 2013, or just simply Blizzard 2013.

=== Late February blizzard ===
- Category 3 "Major" (RSI/NOAA: 6.89)
- Duration: February 24 – February 28, 2013
- Lowest pressure: 984 mb (29.06 inHg)
- Maximum snow: 32.5 in (83 cm)
- Fatalities: 7 fatalities

On February 19, 2013, an extratropical disturbance developed in the Gulf of Alaska. Within the next few days, the system rapidly intensified, before attaining a minimum low pressure of 984 millibars on February 22. It was already affecting the Pacific Northwest, and because it was also forecasted to cause a lot more damage in the U.S. within the next week. After moving ashore in British Columbia, the storm weakened and shrunk considerably in size as it moved southeastwards into the southern Plains. On February 25, the storm began absorbing moisture coming from the Gulf of Mexico, and began to reintensify. The storm quickly became a blizzard, and leveled out at 994 millibars. Its southern severe side spawned severe thunderstorms and several tornadoes on February 25. The storm began dumping ice in some parts of the Midwest beginning on February 25. The system rapidly grew in size and continued to organize, before beginning to weaken later on February 26. Late on February 26, the blizzard began interacting with a much smaller storm to the west, which added extra moisture to the winter storm. The powerful blizzard turned northeastwards towards the Great Lakes region, and continued dumping snow across areas already impacted by another winter storm the week before. On February 27, the storm absorbed the smaller storm to the west. At the same time, the storm spawned a secondary low along its frontal boundary, over the Southeastern United States. The new storm intensified to 991 mbars as it moved off the coast of New England, while the winter storm's main low pressure area became a 1000-mbar cut-off low over the Great Lakes, while continuing to steadily weaken. Despite this, the blizzard continued producing powerful winds, and dumping large amounts of snow and ice. A maximum wind gust of 91 mph was reported in Cedar Key, Florida. The storm complex also spawned a waterspout over downtown Tampa, Florida, which came ashore as an EF0 tornado. The storm systems continued dumping large amounts of snow, icy mix, and rain across most of the Eastern United States, while slowly moving eastward.

The snowfall totals from the winter storm (maximum was 32.5 inches (83 cm)) combined with the previous winter storm greatly exceeded the snowfall totals of 2012, with many states in the Great Plains receiving record amounts of snow. Due to the system, a 400-mile stretch of I-40 between Sayre, Oklahoma and Albuquerque, New Mexico was closed for two days due to whiteout conditions, leaving hundreds of trucks stranded on either end of the closure. The blizzard caused seven deaths; six in Kansas and one in Wisconsin.

=== Early March nor'easter ===
- Category 1 "Notable" (RSI/NOAA: 2.526)
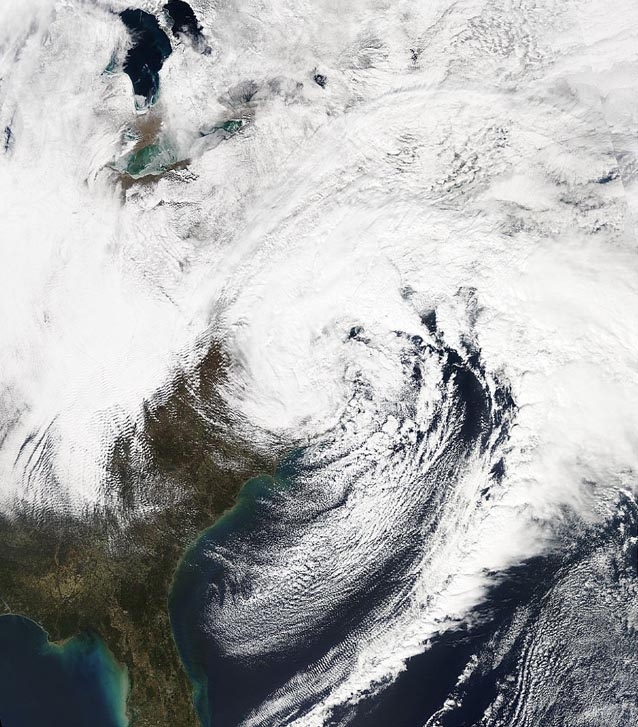
- Duration: March 1 – March 10, 2013
- Lowest pressure: 986 mb (29.12 inHg)
- Maximum snow: 36 in (91 cm)
- Fatalities: 10 fatalities

In early March, a winter storm formed in the Upper Midwest and began to move to the south-southeast. This system was sort of a hybrid Alberta clipper, in the way it had more moisture than a usual clipper has. The winter storm moved to the east, dropping snow accumulations of 3–6 inches (7.6–15.2 cm) on March 5. Moving now to the east, it began to approach the Northeast. The snow was hanging back on the western end of the storm, making it look like the system was being stretched out. Rain began to move into the Mid-Atlantic late on March 5, quickly switching over to snow near Washington, D.C. The winter storm continued to move to the east towards the coastline, with the western edge of the snow back in Indiana dissipating. Snow began to condense into snowbands as the system moved off the East Coast near Virginia and began to transition to a nor'easter. The system continued to move northeastward, dropping light snow accumulations before slowing down and stalling for a day. During this time period, the system absorbed a weak disturbance to the west that was approaching it, resulting in more moisture being added to the system. This sudden addition of moisture resulted in a blossom of snow developing from Vermont to southern New Jersey. With this, snowfall totals were much higher than anticipated. The storm gradually moved away by March 10, with snowfall totals of 12–24 inches (30–61 cm) in the Northeast.

=== Late March storm complex ===
- Category 1 "Notable" (RSI/NOAA: 1.621)
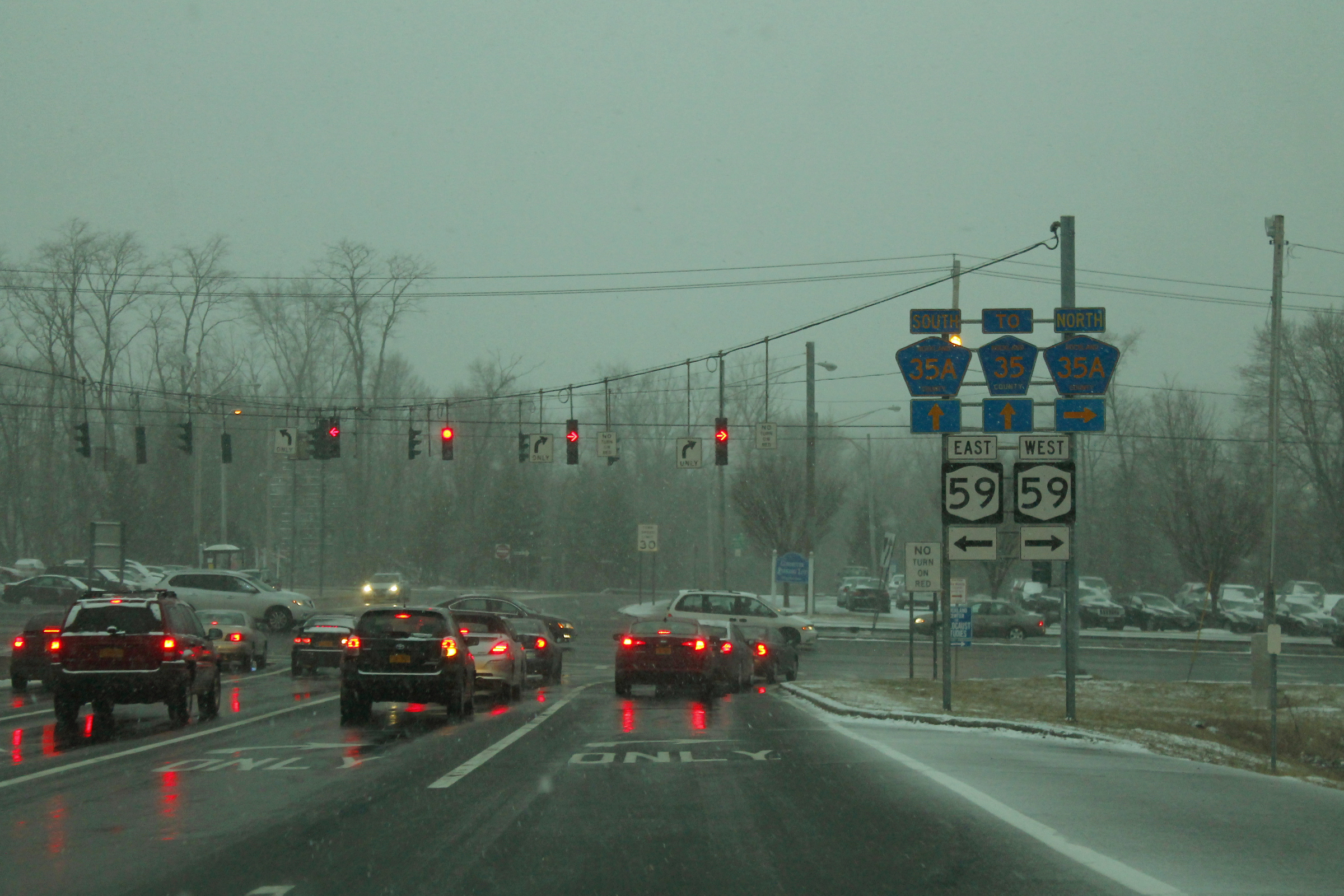
- Duration: March 18 – March 20, 2013
- Lowest pressure: 998 mb (29.47 inHg)
- Maximum snow: 28 in (71 cm)
- Fatalities: 3 fatalities
- Damage: > $600 million (2013 USD)

On March 18, an upper-level trough in a polar jet stream, associated with an occluded low-pressure system, moved across the Great Lakes region. A low-pressure area formed off the Mid-Atlantic coast on the same day, as a subtropical jet shortwave engaged with a coastal baroclinic zone that was associated with cold air centered east of the Appalachian Mountains. The low-pressure system strengthened, with its pressure dropping to 1004 millibars on March 19 while located south of Long Island, New York. A warm front extended from the low-pressure area into the Atlantic Ocean, while a cold front also extended from the low and moved across portions of the Southeastern United States. Heavy snow fell as a result of the strengthening low moving northward as the subtropical and polar systems phased partially across the Northeastern United States. The low-pressure system then moved northeastward, moving inland and approaching Provincetown, Massachusetts by 00:00 UTC (19:00 EDT), with a pressure of 998 millibars. In the next 12 hours, the pressure of the system dropped 13 millibars due to enhanced upper-level divergence, and strong frontogentic forcing contributed to heavy snowfall across portions of New England. The low-pressure area further strengthened as it moved offshore to the Atlantic Ocean into the Gulf of Maine, before moving inland across Nova Scotia and New Brunswick in Canada while producing heavy snowfall across northern Maine.

Blizzard conditions in western Minnesota resulted in 127 miles (204 km) of I-94 shutting down from Alexandria to the North Dakota border. Several other highways, including US 2, US 10, and MN 210, were also shut down, and several schools and businesses were closed as blizzard conditions occurred across portions of North Dakota and South Dakota. More than two dozen vehicles were stranded on I-29 in North Dakota, which led to rescues. The heaviest snow across the region fell in International Falls, Minnesota, receiving 28 inches (71 cm) of snow, while the highest wind gust during the blizzard was at Mitchell Municipal Airport in Davison County, South Dakota, recording a wind gust of 49 miles per hour (79 km/h). There were at least 176 vehicle accidents in Minnesota, which included 10 injury crashes, and there were also several vehicle crashes in Michigan. During the winter storm, snow emergencies were declared in Hastings and Mendota Heights in Minnesota. A travel advisory was issued in Iowa by the Iowa Department of Transportation as a blizzard warning was in effect for northwest portions of the state.

Delays occurred on the Cross County Parkway in New York as a result of the snow, and a bus carrying the Harlem Globetrotters basketball team crashed in Marlborough, Massachusetts on I-290. The World Trade Center (PATH station) closed briefly during the evening of March 18, because of falling ice from 1 World Trade Center. Around 3 inches (7.6 cm) of snow fell in Central Park, though accumulations were more significant in the Bronx and New Jersey. Two semi-trucks jackknifed on the eastbound lanes of I-84 in Connecticut which closed four lanes altogether, and an accident involving a tractor-trailer closed an off-ramp on I-91 in Wallingford, Connecticut. Several vehicle crashes occurred in the Greater New Haven area. Numerous flights were cancelled at Portland International Jetport in Portland, Maine, while several flights were also cancelled at Bangor International Airport. Vehicle accidents resulted in several minor injuries across Maine. At least 545 flights were cancelled, and at least 139 power outages occurred across Maine. As a result of the heavy snowfall, the Massachusetts Department of Transportation deployed 2,800 trucks to clear snow across roadways. One person was killed after a vehicle crash on Francis Lewis Boulevard in Queens, New York.

=== Late April–early May winter storm ===
On May 1–3, a late snow storm occurred across the central United States from Arkansas to Minnesota. The storm formed from a deep upper level trough which became a cut-off low, the event was named "Achilles" by the Weather Channel. The storm broke records for depth of snow and lateness in the season, and was cited as the worst May snow since 1947.

=== Late May Northeast snowstorm ===
Between May 25 and 26, unusually late snowfall impacted parts of Vermont, New Hampshire and Ontario. Most accumulations were limited to higher elevations; however, in parts of New Hampshire, snow levels fell to 500 ft (150 m) in altitude. Notable measurements in the state included 4 in (10 cm) in Jefferson and 2 in (5.1 cm) in Alexandria. These accumulations tied the record-latest snowfall date in New Hampshire of May 26, 1967. Snowfall was expected to reach 6 in (15 cm) in the eastern townships of Ontario. The combination of heavy rains and snow in Vermont led to significant power outages in the state, with Green Mountain Power reporting approximately 12,100 residences without electricity. Some areas in the state received over 6 in (15 cm) of snow, with a maximum of 13.2 in (34 cm) falling on Mount Mansfield. This marked the latest 12 in (30 cm) snowfall on record for the area. Record-late snows also occurred in Syracuse and Binghamton, New York. Unofficial reports from Whiteface Mountain in the Adirondacks indicated as much as 34 in (86 cm) of snow.

== Records ==
=== United States ===
In January 2013, Salt Lake City had an average temperature of 19.4 °F (−7.0 °C), which became the coldest month on record since 1949 and the sixth-coldest January since 1874.

On March 5 a record 6-inch snow depth was noted in Chicago's O'Hare International Airport, exceeding the previous 1999 record for that date by 2.2 inches. On the same day 900 flights were cancelled in O'Hare Airport, while Midway Airport reportedly cancelled 240 flights. U.S. Airways reported 350 flight cancellations for March 6.

In Orlando, Florida, the temperature lowered to 41 °F (5 °C) on March 28, 2 degrees below the record of 1955. The lowest minimum temperature record of 1971 (51 °F (11 °C)) was also broken in West Palm Beach, Florida, where a temperature of 48 °F (9 °C) was recorded on March 28.

== Season effects ==
2012–13 North American winter season statistics
Event name	Dates active	RSI category	RSI value	Highest gust mph (km/h)	Minimum pressure (mbar)	Maximum snow in (cm)	Maximum ice in (mm)	Areas affected	Damage (2013 USD)	Deaths
Season aggregates
0 RSI storms	TBD – TBD				TBD	0	0		≥ $0	0

== See also ==
- Great Arctic Cyclone of 2012

== Notes ==
Preceded by 2011–12	North American winters 2012–13	Succeeded by 2013–14
