= Mount Le Conte =

Mount Le Conte (or Mount LeConte) can refer to:

- Mount Le Conte (California)
- Mount Le Conte (Tennessee)
- Le Conte Mountain (Washington)
- LeConte Point, mountain in Yosemite National Park

== See also ==
- Mount Lecointe in Antarctica
