= Bear Paw Ski Bowl =

Ski area in Montana, United States

- Location in Montana Bear Paw Ski Bowl (the United States)
- Location: Hill County, Montana
- Nearest city: Havre, Montana
- Coordinates: 48°9′51.84″N 109°40′12.79″W
- Status: Active
- Opened: 1960
- Owner: Chippewa Cree Tribe of Rocky Boy
- Vertical: 860
- Top elevation: 5850 ft
- Base elevation: 4990 ft
- Skiable area: 80 acres
- Trails: 24
- Longest run: .05 mi
- Lift system: 1 Double, 1 Handle Tow
- Snowfall: 140"
- Night skiing: No
- Website: https://www.bearpawskibowl.org/

Bear Paw Ski Bowl is a small ski area which draws visitors primarily from Havre, Montana and the nearby Rocky Boys Indian Reservation located on the Chippewa Cree Recreation Area in north central Montana, along the Hi-Line. The Chippewa Cree tribe owns Bear Paw, and it is managed by a volunteer non-profit organization called the Snow Dance Ski Association, along with the Eagle Creek Ski Patrol. The ski area has existed since 1959 and has been developed over the years gradually by the association and the tribe. It was temporarily closed from February 1993 to March 1994, when a crew using faulty equipment tried to make some adjustments and repairs on the gantry (an elevated engine room), and the chairlift.

== Lift and Runs ==
The ski area sits on the east side of Elk Mountain. There is a tow rope and one 2 person lift at the area. The bottom of the lift sits at 4990 feet above sea level, the top reaches 5850 feet, from top to bottom the ski area is 860 vertical feet.

There are 24 runs that are unrated. They are Bikini Beach, Screaming Eagle, G-S, Chippewa, T-Cup, Little Bear, Midway Trail, Z Trail, Route 9, Big Knife, Don't Ask, Eats, The Chutes, Bent Knee, Bear Paw, The Face, Snowdance, Round Day, Upper N.B. North Bowl, Four Souls, Boardwalk, Medicine Talk, Many Rocks.
