= February 2013 North American blizzard =

Nor'easter in 2013

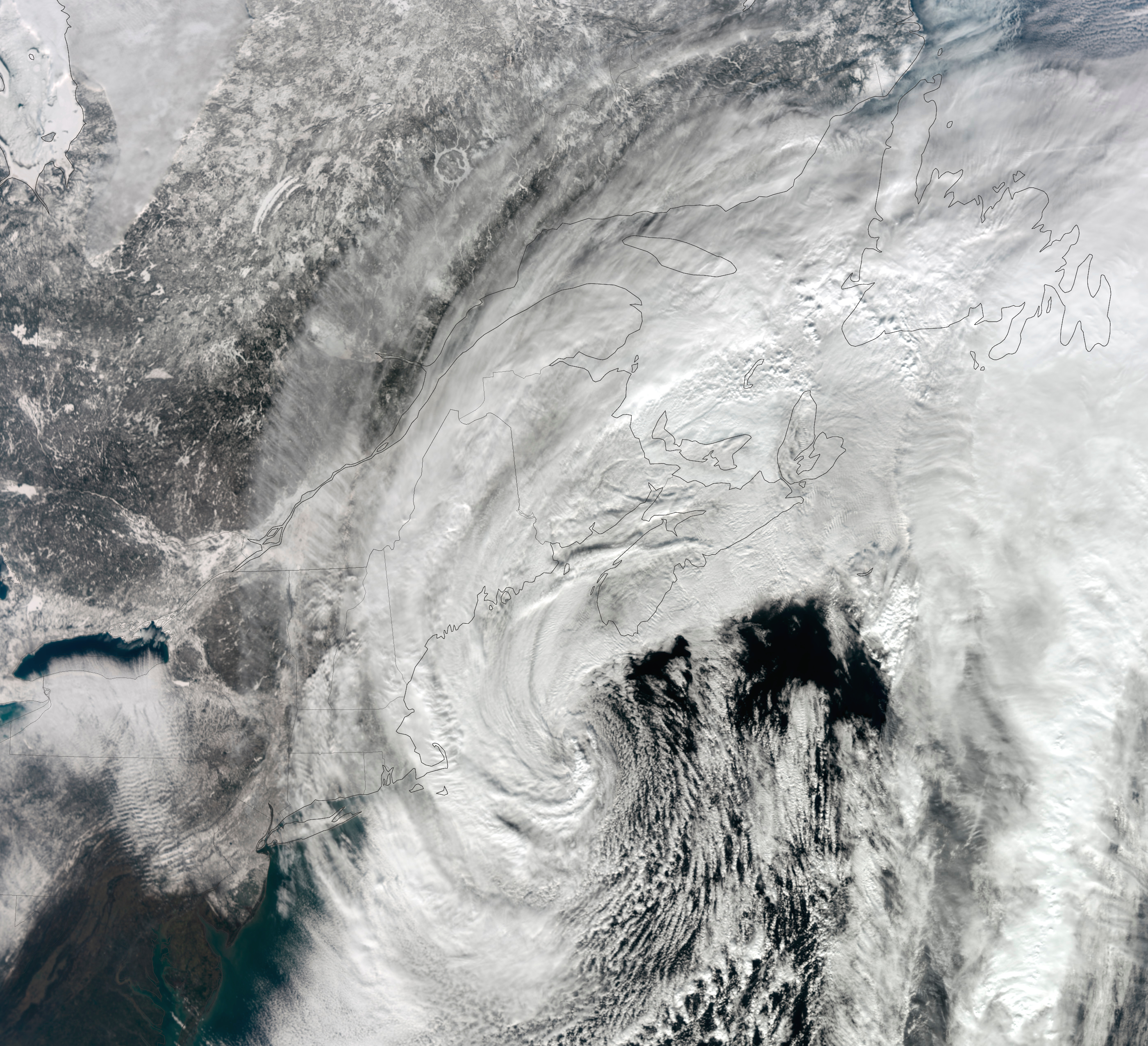
- Suomi NPP image of the nor'easter on February 9, 2013

Meteorological history
- Formed: February 7, 2013
- Exited land: February 10, 2013
- Dissipated: February 18, 2013

Category 3 "Major" blizzard
- Regional snowfall index: 9.21 (NOAA)
- Highest winds: 85 mph (140 km/h) (1-minute sustained winds)
- Highest gusts: 102 mph (164 km/h)
- Lowest pressure: 968 mbar (hPa); 28.59 inHg
- Max. snowfall: 40 inches (100 cm) at Hamden, Connecticut

Overall effects
- Fatalities: 19 total
- Damage: $100 million (2013 USD)
- Areas affected: Eastern United States; Canada (Atlantic Canada, Central Canada); Iceland; British Isles
- Power outages: ≥700,000
- Part of the 2012–13 North American winter

From February 8–10, 2013, a severe and powerful blizzard, unofficially referred to as Winter Storm Nemo by The Weather Channel and other media, or more commonly the Blizzard of 2013, primarily affecting the Northeastern United States and parts of Canada, causing heavy snowfall up to 1–2 feet (12–24 in; 30–61 cm) and hurricane-force winds. The blizzard developed from the combination of two areas of low pressure, before rapidly strengthening once it neared New England as a nor'easter. The storm crossed the Atlantic Ocean, affecting Ireland and the United Kingdom before dissipating. The nor'easter's effects in the United States received a Category 3 rank on the Northeast Snowfall Impact Scale, classifying it as a "Major" Winter Storm.

The first low-pressure system, originating from the Northern Plains of the United States, produced moderate amounts of snow across the Great Lakes region of the U.S. and Canada. The second low, originating across the state of Texas, produced heavy rains and flooding across much of the Southeast and Mid-Atlantic parts of the U.S. As the two systems merged off the Northeast coast on February 8, 2013, they produced heavy snowfall over a large region from North Jersey and inland from New York City through eastern New England up to coastal Maine and inland to Ontario.

Total snowfall in Boston, Massachusetts, reached 24.9 inches (63 cm), the fifth-highest total ever recorded in the city. New York City officially recorded 11.4 inches (29 cm) of snow at Central Park, and Portland, Maine, set a record of 31.9 inches (81 cm). Hamden, Connecticut recorded the highest snowfall of the storm at 40 inches (100 cm), the second highest total in Connecticut was recorded in Milford at 38 inches (97 cm). Many surrounding cities picked up at least 1 foot (30 cm). In addition to the significant snowfall totals, hurricane-force wind gusts were recorded, reaching 102 mph (164 km/h) in Nova Scotia, 89 mph (143 km/h) at Mount Desert Rock, Maine, and 84 mph (135 km/h) off the coast of Cuttyhunk, Massachusetts. Boston experienced a storm surge of 4.2 ft (1.3 m), its fourth-highest. The storm affected Atlantic Canada after hitting the Northeastern United States.

Watches and warnings were issued in preparation for the storm, and state governors declared states of emergency in all states in New England and in New York. Flights at many major airports across the region were canceled, and travel bans were put into place on February 8 in several states. Hundreds ended up stranded on Long Island late on February 8 as a result of the rapidly accumulating snowfall. A combination of strong winds and heavy, wet snow left 700,000 customers without electricity at the height of the storm. At least eighteen deaths were attributed to the storm.

== Meteorological history ==
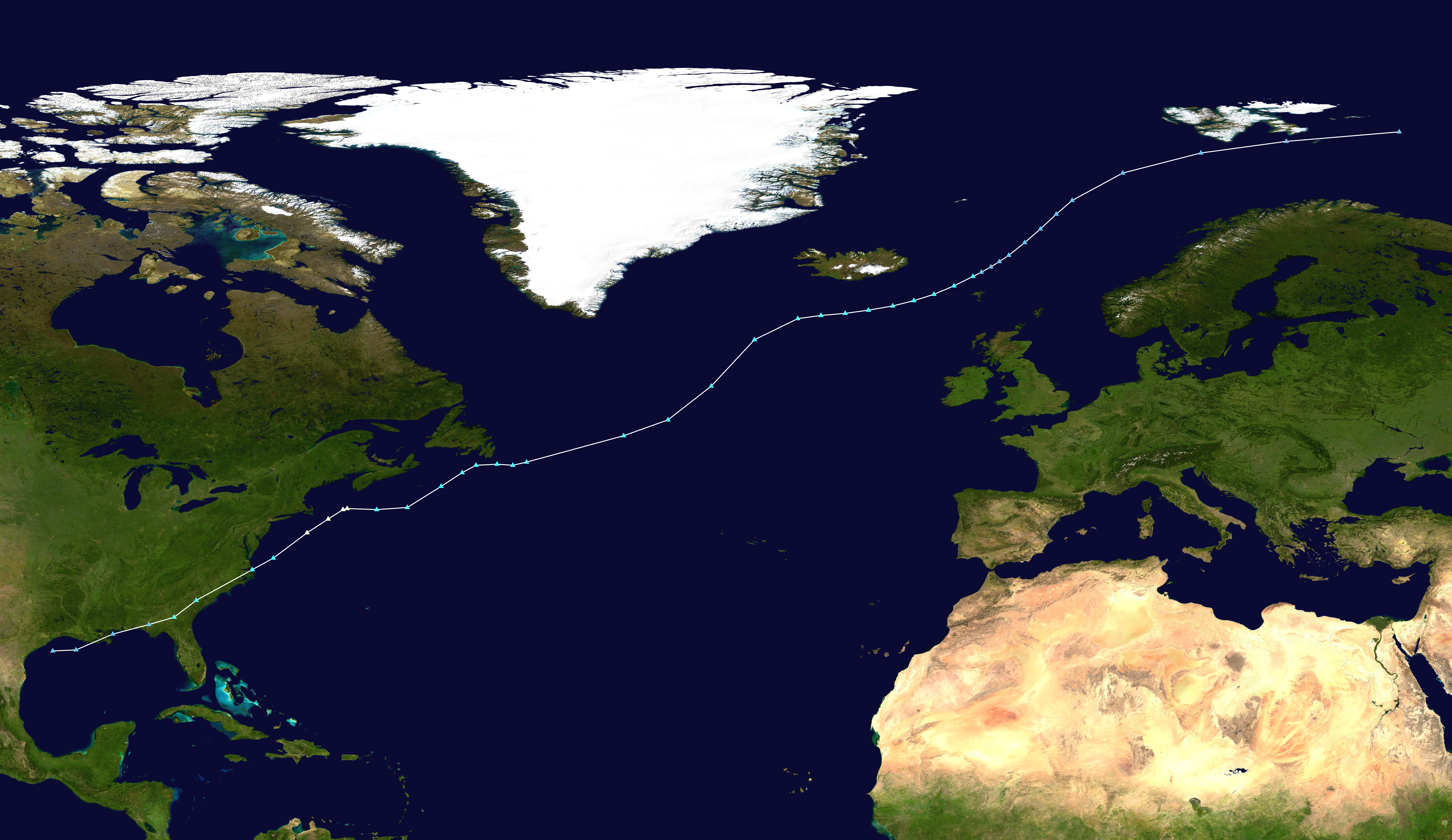
Map plotting the storm's track and intensity, according to the Saffir–Simpson scale Map key Saffir–Simpson scale Tropical depression (≤38 mph, ≤62 km/h) Tropical storm (39–73 mph, 63–118 km/h) Category 1 (74–95 mph, 119–153 km/h) Category 2 (96–110 mph, 154–177 km/h) Category 3 (111–129 mph, 178–208 km/h) Category 4 (130–156 mph, 209–251 km/h) Category 5 (≥157 mph, ≥252 km/h) Unknown Storm type Tropical cyclone Subtropical cyclone Extratropical cyclone, remnant low, tropical disturbance, or monsoon depression

Atmospheric conditions leading up to the formation of the blizzard were rather anomalous and were conducive for cyclogenesis. Such conditions included the presence of a ridge over the North Atlantic and the strengthening of a trough in California. The impactful nature of the eventual winter storm event was first predicted in National Centers for Environmental Prediction (NCEP) and Hydrometeorological Prediction Center (HPC) forecasts at 1200 UTC on February 6, (Note: The Weather Prediction Center was formerly known as the Hydrometeorological Prediction Center until March 5, 2013) when the accumulation of at least 4 in (100 mm) of snow in the ensuing hours was considered a moderate probability in parts of Wisconsin and Michigan. Fueled by energy originating from the Gulf of Alaska and carried by the polar jet stream, a low-pressure area formed as anticipated in Montana, at 1200 UTC the next day. The cyclone tracked in a general east-northeastward direction throughout the day, reaching central Indiana by early on February 8.

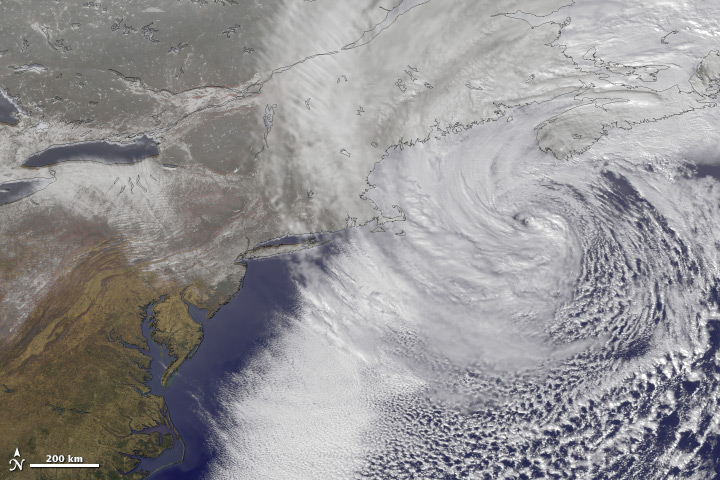
The blizzard pulling away from the Northeastern U.S. on February 9, with an apparent eye-feature

As the low-pressure system over the United States Midwest developed, energy associated with the subtropical jet over the Mexican plateau tracked into the Gulf of Mexico, resulting in the formation of another low-pressure area just off the coast of Texas on February 7. Tracking eastward, the system produced isolated severe weather across the United States Gulf Coast. Near noontime that day, the cyclone moved into the Florida Panhandle. By February 8, the low-pressure system had moved into Georgia. Both the system in the Gulf of Mexico and the system in the Midwestern United States were supported by the same shortwave trough. Due to blocking steering patterns, both storms began to gravitate towards the Eastern Seaboard.

The HPC began issuing periodic storm summary bulletins on the two low-pressure areas at 0300 UTC on February 8. Their forecasts suggested that the system associated with the subtropical jet stream would rapidly intensify near the United States East Coast, later absorbing the system associated with the polar jet stream. A few hours later, the southern disturbance began a phase of barometric deepening as it tracked northeastward off the Outer Banks, while the northern system maintained an easterly course into northwestern Ohio. Beginning at 0000 UTC on February 9, the two systems began an extensive merging process, with the strengthening cyclone originating from the subtropics absorbing energy from the cyclone originating from the polar jet stream. This resulted in the cyclone off the United States East Coast to continue intensifying while the initial system to the northwest gradually diffused over the Mid-Atlantic states. Throughout the day the resulting system continued to track to the northeast, bringing along with it a large swath of snowfall that tracked across New England and into Canada. By 1200 UTC, the extratropical cyclone had strengthened enough to classify it as a bomb.

At 2100 UTC on February 9, the extratropical cyclone reached its peak intensity with a minimum barometric pressure of 968 millibars (28.6 inHg) while located roughly 200 mi (320 km) off the coast of Massachusetts. After reaching peak intensity the system began to steadily weaken and depart the coast of New England, tracking near Nova Scotia early on February 10, upon which the HPC issued their final storm summary bulletin. Despite the discontinuance of bulletins, the extratropical cyclone continued to persist and assumed an easterly course. By February 13, the storm system had tracked just south of Iceland, bringing a cold and warm front into the British Isles. The system then began to curve northward through the Norwegian Sea over the next few days, before it was absorbed by a larger system on February 18.

== Preparations ==
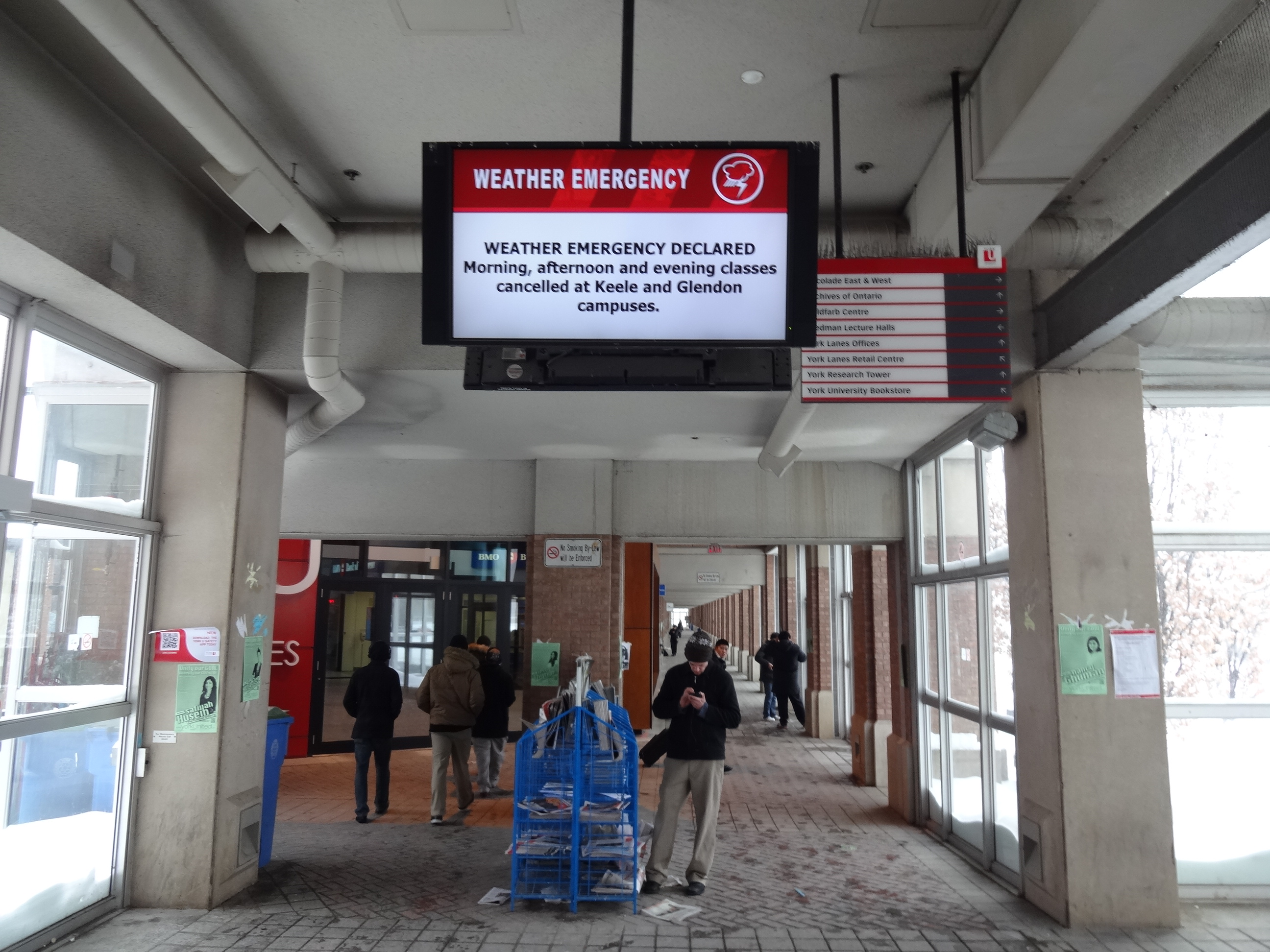
Winter storm warning at York University.

=== Canada ===
Environment Canada issued winter storm warnings for much of Ontario, while Toronto issued an extreme weather alert ahead of the storm. Several universities and colleges closed throughout Southern Ontario. Many flights were canceled in the region and Greyhound canceled bus service to New York. In the Maritimes, blizzard warnings were in effect for parts of New Brunswick and all of Nova Scotia and Prince Edward Island, with more than 50 centimetres (20 in) possible.

=== United States ===
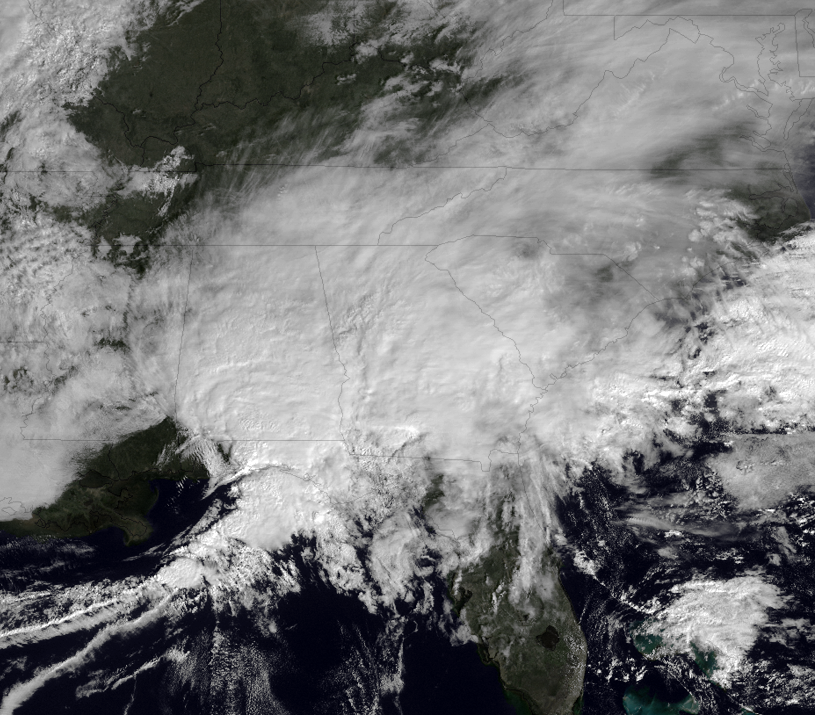
The precursor to the nor'easter over the Southeastern United States on February 7

By late on February 7, 2013, winter storm warnings and winter weather advisories were issued for the northeastern United States, from the Upper Midwest to New England. There was also a blizzard warning for the New York metropolitan area, all of Connecticut, all of Rhode Island, and eastern Massachusetts, as well as southeast New Hampshire and coastal Maine. On February 8, blizzard warnings were expanded to include inland portions of southeast New Hampshire, and inland portions of Maine's coastal counties. By February 8, storm warnings and hurricane force wind warnings were in effect for the New England and Mid Atlantic waters, in addition to coastal flood warnings.

In Chicago, officials deployed 199 snow trucks, and the Illinois State Toll Highway Authority sent 182 plows for its road system. In the northeast United States, the storm threatened beaches and dunes in areas affected by Hurricane Sandy from the previous October. Due to the storm's threat, airlines canceled more than 2,700 flights, mostly for February 8. In New York, officials readied snow removal crews, with more than 250,000 tons of salt prepared. Schools were closed in Hartford, Connecticut and Providence, Rhode Island, among other cities.

Connecticut Governor Dannel Malloy declared a state of emergency at 12:00 p.m. EST (1700 UTC) on February 8, and closed limited-access highways statewide at 4:00 p.m. Connecticut Light and Power and United Illuminating planned for 30 percent of customers to lose power in Connecticut, and hired out-of-state line crews to assist with power restoration. Governor Malloy on February 9 ordered all roads in the state closed except to essential vehicles.

Rhode Island Governor Lincoln Chafee declared a state of emergency on February 8, and issued a travel ban for interstates and other major highways effective 5 p.m. EST.

Massachusetts Governor Deval Patrick declared a state of emergency at 12:00 p.m. EST on February 8, and banned vehicles from all public roads after 4:00 p.m.; it was the first statewide driving ban in Massachusetts since the Blizzard of 1978, which happened to strike the region exactly 35 years and 1 day earlier. The ban, issued via executive order, included a penalty of one year in jail and/or a five hundred dollar fine. The ban did not apply to emergency vehicles, hospital workers, or the media. The Massachusetts Bay Transportation Authority (MBTA) suspended subway, commuter rail, bus, and boat service at 3:30 p.m. on February 8, and flights at Boston Logan International Airport were suspended at 4:00 p.m. Boston mayor Thomas Menino ordered schools to close and recommended that businesses shut down during the storm. The National Hockey League postponed a game between the Boston Bruins and the Tampa Bay Lightning that was scheduled to be played at Boston's TD Garden on February 9 due to the nor'easter; the game was originally set for a delayed start of 7 p.m.; before the game was first delayed to 7 p.m. it was set for 1 p.m.

New York Governor Andrew Cuomo declared a state of emergency on February 8. Maine Governor Paul LePage declared a state of emergency as well. New Jersey Governor Chris Christie activated his state's Emergency Operations Center on the morning of February 8.

Approximately 2,295 National Guard soldiers and airmen were activated in Connecticut, Massachusetts, Rhode Island, and New York to support actions needed on state roads.

=== United Kingdom ===
The Met Office issued an amber warning for snow and ice for the weakened storm for between 09:05 till 23:55 GMT on Wednesday 13 February. The already existing Cold weather health alert was extended in anticipation of the storm. Forecasters also warned of severe drifting of snow ahead of the gale force winds.

== Impact ==
Storm on Keele Campus, York University, in Toronto.

=== Canada ===
The storm brought significant snow to Southern Ontario from February 7 to February 8. Snowdrifts caused major disruptions on roads and freeways. Nearly a thousand flights were canceled at Pearson International Airport, as well as a numerous flights at Ottawa Macdonald–Cartier International Airport, Montreal–Pierre Elliott Trudeau International Airport, and Billy Bishop Toronto City Airport (Toronto island).

The storm brought snow and high winds to Toronto, Ottawa and Montreal, as well as extensive flooding to parts of Nova Scotia and New Brunswick. In Toronto, it was the largest snowfall in 5 years with accumulations of 10 inches (25 cm) at the airport and 14.4 inches (37 cm) in downtown (And up to 18 inches (46 cm) in the suburbs). Power was disrupted for thousands of customers in Atlantic Canada, and dozens of flights were canceled at Halifax Stanfield International Airport on February 9. All Marine Atlantic ferries on February 9 were canceled. Nova Scotia was hit with wind gusts up to 164 kilometers per hour (102 mph), and more than 21,000 Nova Scotia Power customers were without electricity as of the afternoon of February 9.

=== United States ===
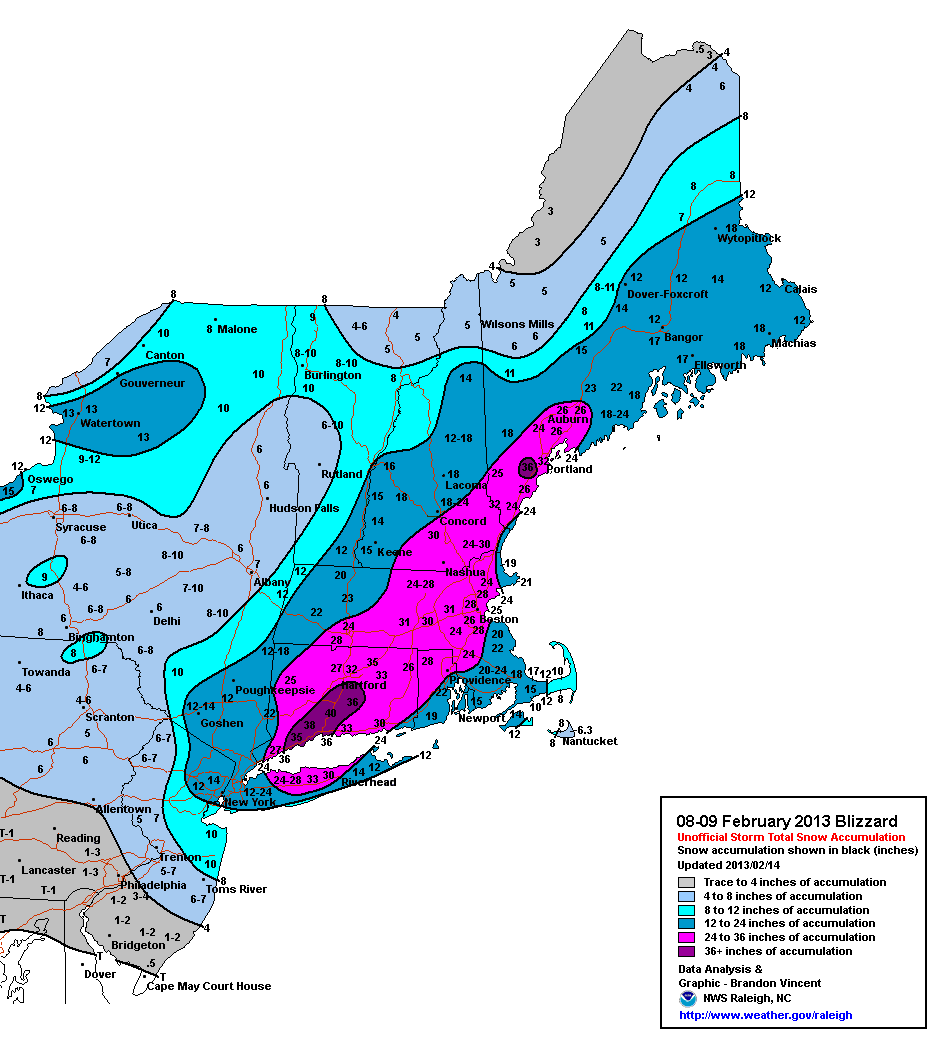
Snowfall totals in New England from February 8–9

==== Northeast ====
Snow and rainfall began at 9 a.m. on February 8 across New England; by late that day, totals reached 8 in (20 cm) near Milton, Vermont. Later that evening, snow was falling at 2 to 3 inches (5 to 8 cm) per hour in coastal Massachusetts, and at a significant rate of over 6 inches per hour (15 cm/h) in parts of Connecticut. Thunder and lightning along with small hail were reported within the heavy band of snow in Connecticut. In Massachusetts, two neighborhoods in Quincy and about a dozen homes in Salisbury were evacuated due to coastal flooding. Voluntary evacuation orders were issued for oceanfront residents in Revere, Marshfield, and Scituate. Early on February 9, mandatory evacuations were ordered for Massachusetts coastal regions near the town of Hull due to possible flooding and high winds.

Parts of coastal New England experienced hurricane-force winds from the storm, with a peak gust of 89 mph (143 km/h) in Mount Desert Rock, Maine. A maximum gust of 87 mph (140 km/h) was recorded on the Isles of Shoals, a small group of islands off the New Hampshire coast. Winds of 84 mph (135 km/h) were recorded in Buzzards Bay near Cuttyhunk, Massachusetts, and Boston's Logan Airport measured a wind gust of 76 mph (122 km/h).

When the snow stopped, the highest amount recorded was 40 inches (100 cm) in Hamden, Connecticut. The 31.9 inches (81 cm) of snow in Portland, Maine, set a new record for the city from a single snowstorm, and Gorham, Maine set a record for the state of 35.5 inches (90 cm). It was the second highest total in Hartford, Connecticut, with 22.8 inches (58 cm); Concord, New Hampshire, received 24 inches (61 cm) of snow. Boston received 24.9 inches (63 cm) of snow, the fifth highest total in the city from a single storm. It was the third-largest snowfall in Worcester, Massachusetts, at 28.7 inches (73 cm). Connecticut set a 24 hour snowfall record at 36 inches (91 cm).

At Central Park in New York, 11.4 inches (29 cm) of snow was recorded, while other parts of the city accumulated as much as 16 inches (41 cm). Much of Long Island was hit with over 2 feet (61 cm) of snow, with snowfall as high as 33.5 inches (85 cm) being recorded in Medford, in Suffolk County.

==== Other affected areas ====
Snowfall accumulation in New England

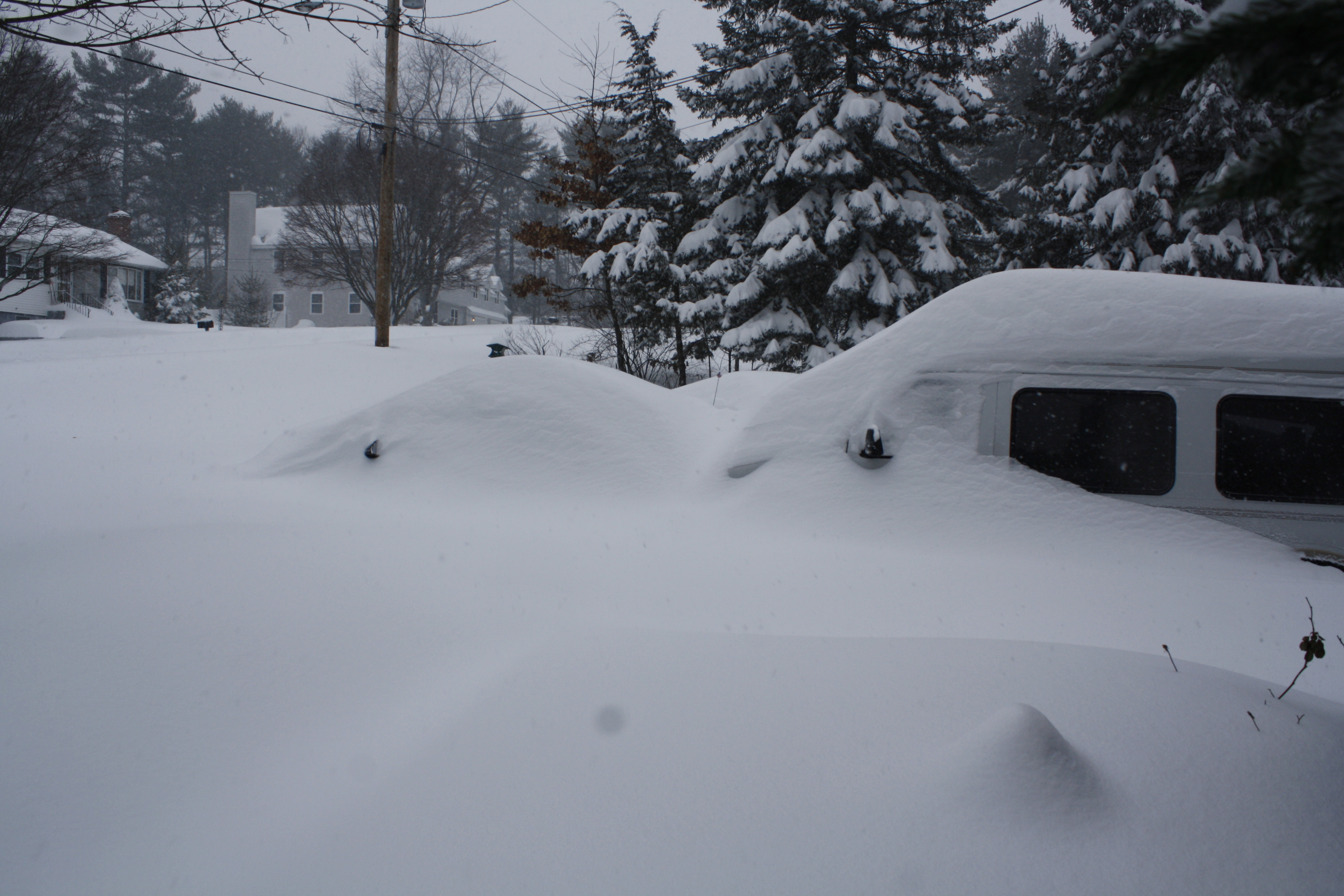
The snowfall in Billerica, Massachusetts

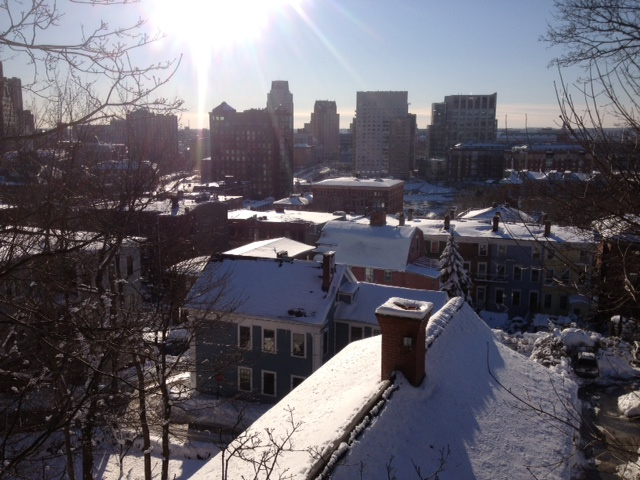
Snow cover in Providence, Rhode Island

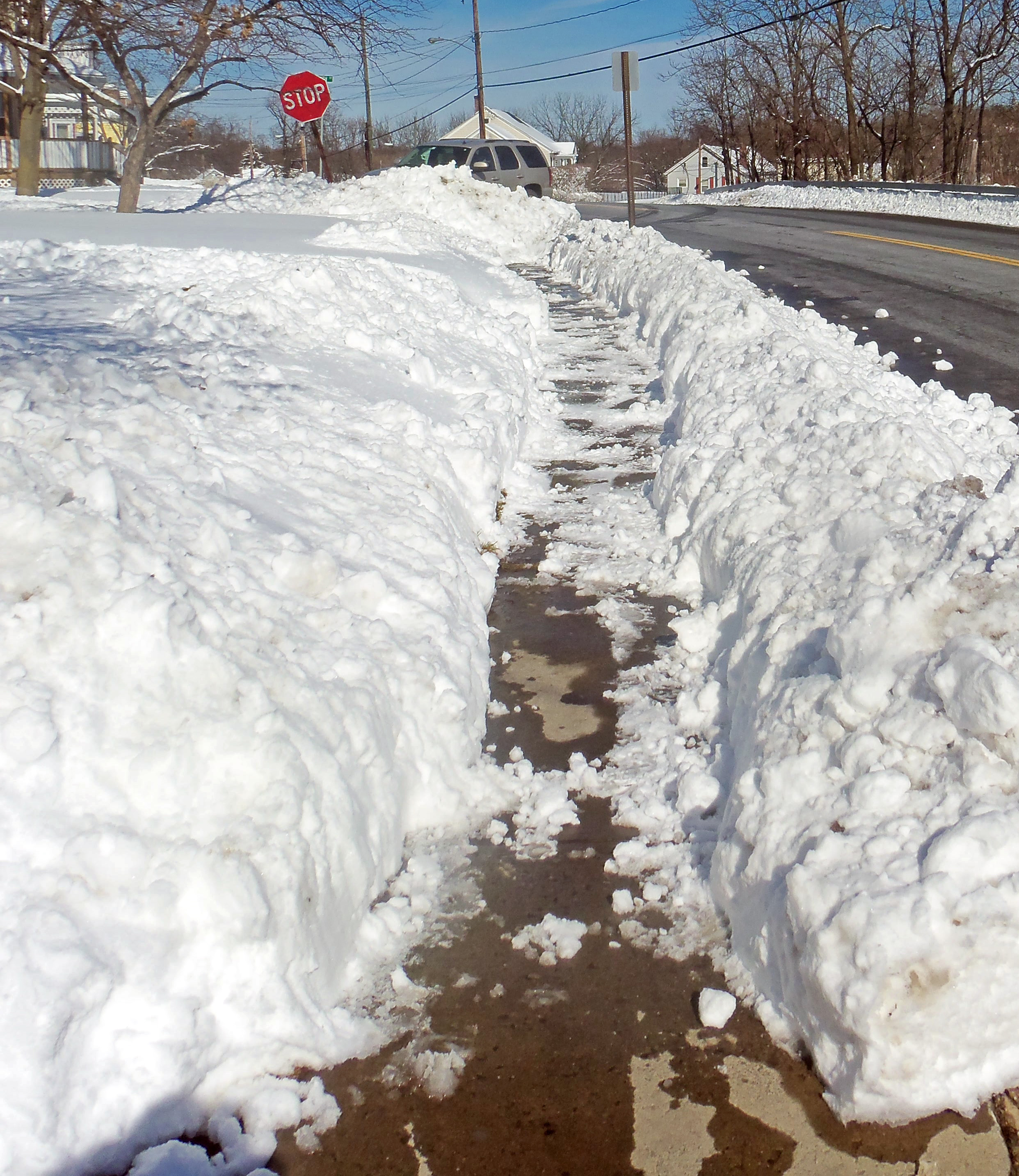
A sidewalk shoveled after the storm in Walden, New York

The secondary low over Indiana produced light to moderate snowfall that extended to Wisconsin. Totals reached 11.6 in (29 cm) in Muskegon, Michigan. The storm previously dropped 1.5 in (3.8 cm) of snow in Chicago, and 8.5 in (22 cm) was reported in Beach Park, Illinois on February 8. Several traffic accidents were reported in Illinois.

==== Power ====
The Nuclear Regulatory Commission said the Pilgrim Nuclear Power Plant in Plymouth, Massachusetts experienced an automatic shutdown at around 9:15 p.m. EST on February 8 after losing off-site power; there was no threat to the public.

The storm caused power outages, shortages at gas stations, and numerous car accidents across the region. As of 12:45 a.m. EST on February 9, 321,000 customers were without power in Massachusetts, 191,000 in Rhode Island, and 32,000 in Connecticut. By 10:30 a.m., more than 655,000 customers were without power due to the storm, including 405,000 in Massachusetts and 185,000 in Rhode Island. As of the evening of February 9, approximately 575,000 people were without power.

As of the late evening of February 9, 344,000 customers were without power in Massachusetts and 31,000 in Connecticut. About 390,000 remained without power in total in the Northeast. In total, utility companies reported about 700,000 customers were without power across nine states. As of Sunday evening, there were still about 205,000 customers in Massachusetts without power. Some areas were projected not to have power restored until Thursday February 14.

The Pilgrim Nuclear Power Plant lost power again on February 10, after an offsite outage had caused a shutdown on February 8. A spokeswoman for Entergy Corp., the Louisiana company that owns Pilgrim said, "There's no worker or public safety concern," she said. "We're troubleshooting the cause."

On Long Island, at least 40,000 people lost power, 29,000 outages in which were restored several hours later.

==== Travel ====
More than 6,300 commercial flights were canceled on February 8 and 9. In the New York City area, John F. Kennedy Airport, LaGuardia Airport and Newark Airport opened 7 a.m. EST on February 9. In Boston, Logan International Airport reopened at 11 p.m. EST on February 9. Also, in Hartford, Bradley International Airport reopened at 6 a.m. EST on February 10. As of Sunday night, Logan Airport had limited service.

Hundreds of cars got stuck on the Long Island Expressway in Suffolk County beginning the afternoon of February 8. On February 10, from 7 a.m. to 5 p.m. EST, about 26 miles of the Long Island Expressway were closed between exits 57 and 73 for snow removal. The closure was extended till 9 p.m. EST however, it was closed indefinitely as of 10:50 p.m. EST. The westbound side of the Long Island Expressway opened early Monday morning, while the eastbound lanes between exits 57 and 73 remained closed for snow removal. At around 7 a.m. on February 11, both lanes of the Long Island Expressway reopened.

==== Additional effects ====
In the afternoon of February 9, a portion of the roof of Smithtown Lanes bowling alley in Smithtown, New York collapsed. There were no injuries as the business was closed at the time. A house in Long Island suffered major structural damage due to heavy snow accumulation on the roof.

The Boston Bruins postponed their afternoon home game on Saturday, February 9 at the TD Garden against the Tampa Bay Lightning to Thursday, April 25. The Mohegan Sun resort casino in Connecticut postponed a Saturday night Bon Jovi concert, but the band played for the snowbound guests.

The United States Postal Service (USPS) suspended mail delivery in Connecticut, Maine, Massachusetts, New Hampshire, Rhode Island, Vermont, and parts of New York during and after the storm. Many school districts on Long Island, especially in Suffolk County closed schools for February 11. Boston Public Schools and several other school districts, including Cambridge and Somerville, remained closed on February 11 and 12. On February 10, President Obama declared a state of emergency for Connecticut.

== Fatalities ==
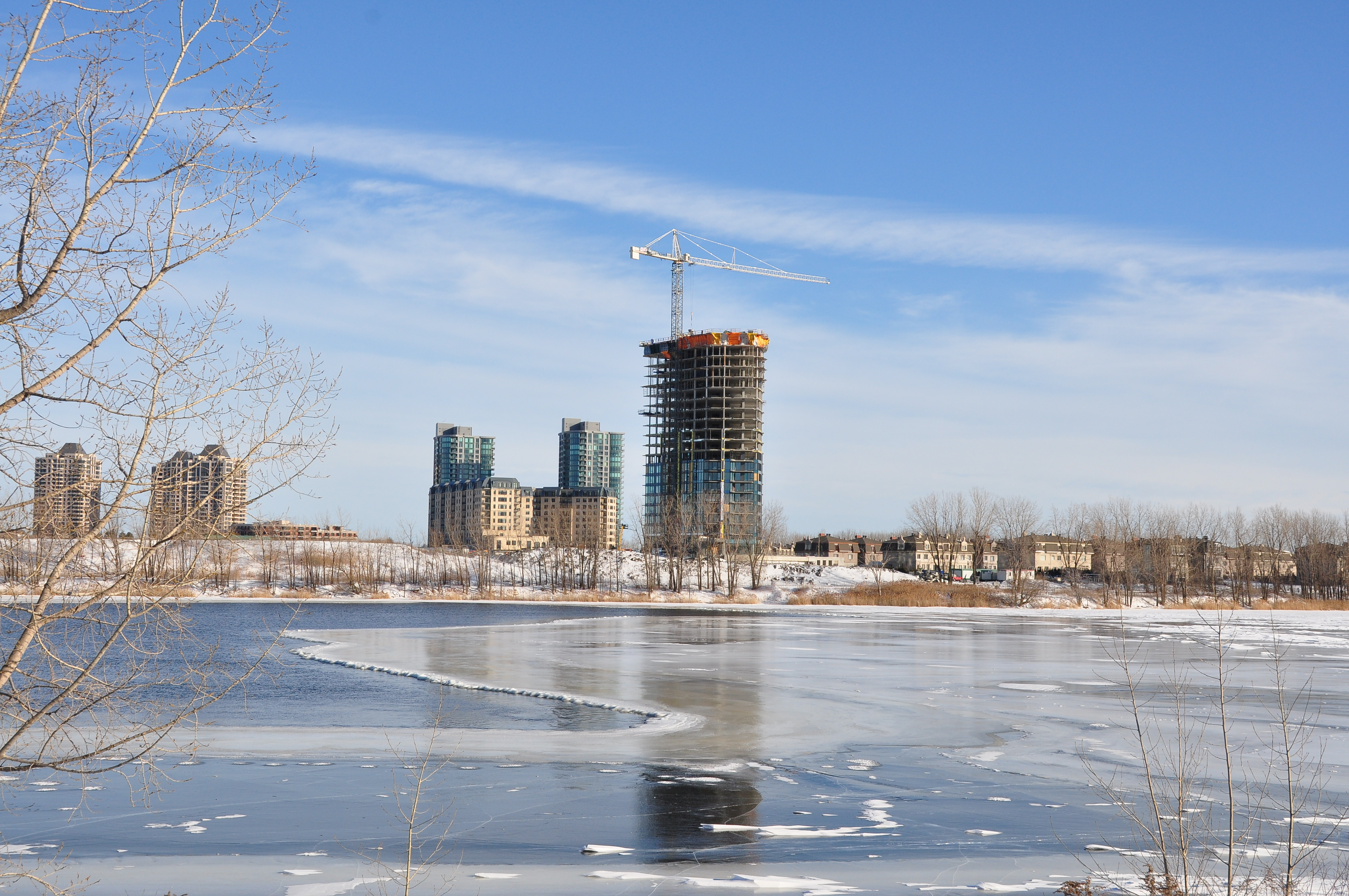
Nuns' Island and a frozen Saint Lawrence River after the nor'easter

=== Canada ===
==== Ontario ====
An 80-year-old woman in Hamilton, and an 80-year-old man in Niagara Falls collapsed and died while shoveling snow. A 49-year-old Oshawa man was killed in a multi-vehicle collision in Pickering. A 57-year-old man from Ottawa died when his car crashed near Prescott.

=== United States ===
==== New England ====
In Connecticut an 81-year-old woman using a snowblower was hit by a car in Prospect, a man in Bridgeport was found dead under snow at his home, a man died after he suffered a heart attack while plowing snow in New Milford, a man from Shelton died while digging his truck out of the snow, and police in Danbury said a man was found dead on his back porch on February 9. In Maine, a 75-year-old man crashed his vehicle into a tree in Passadumkeag, then his pickup ended up in the Penobscot River. In Boston, Massachusetts, a 13-year-old boy and a man died separately due to carbon monoxide poisoning while inside cars because the tailpipes were blocked by snow. A man was killed in an automobile accident in Auburn, New Hampshire when his car spun out on a hill and collided with a tree, flattening the front end of his SUV and crushing him.

==== Mid-Atlantic ====
In New York, a man was plowing his driveway with a tractor on February 8 in Germantown, when the tractor went off the edge of the road and fell on top of him. In Poughkeepsie, a pedestrian was struck by a car and killed. A 58-year-old man in Selden died while clearing snow at his apartment complex. On February 11, three more deaths, all in Northport, New York, were blamed on the storm, bringing the blizzard death toll in Suffolk County to four.

== Names ==
The Weather Channel dubbed the storm "Winter Storm Nemo", in keeping with a list of names they have given to some winter storms since 2012. Hartford, Connecticut, CBS affiliate WFSB named the storm "Blizzard Charlotte", in keeping with a long-standing station tradition of naming major winter storms affecting Connecticut dating back to the early 1970s. The National Weather Service however, has rejected naming winter storms. Despite this, the Free University of Berlin kept the name "Nemo", referring to the storm by that name on their weather maps. Other names for the storm include the "Blizzard of 2013" (or the "Blizzard of '13") and "Blizzard 2013".

== See also ==
- 1993 Storm of the Century
- North American blizzard of 2006
- January 31 – February 2, 2011 North American blizzard
- March 2013 nor'easter
- March 2014 nor'easter
- 2013–14 North American cold wave
- January 2015 North American blizzard
- March 2017 North American blizzard
- January 2018 North American blizzard
