= Ground blizzard =

Snow and ice blown by strong winds

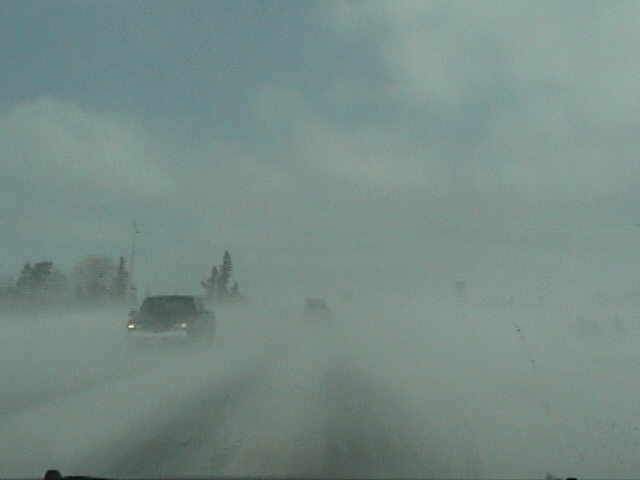
A ground blizzard in Ontario, March 21, 2004

Ground blizzard refers to a weather condition where loose snow or ice on the ground is lifted and blown by strong winds. This can occur in the absence of precipitation, and can even occur when the sky is clear. This is in contrast to "ordinary" blizzards, which are accompanied by heavy falling snow. They can be especially dangerous as they occur after a winter storm has passed, when it is assumed that all forms of severe winter weather has ended.

== Meteorological criteria ==
While the term "ground blizzard" is often associated with intense blowing and drifting snow conditions, there are specific criteria which must be met. Often such criteria will be determined by a country's governing weather agency or other similar body. In the U.S., according to the National Weather Service, a blizzard is defined as having sustained winds or frequent gusts of 35 mph or more, visibility frequently below 1/4 mile in considerable snow and/or blowing snow, and the above conditions are expected to prevail for 3 hours or longer. Environment Canada similarly maintains that widespread reduction of visibility to less than 400 meters due to snow and/or blowing snow and sustained wind speeds or gusts of 40 km/h or more must be present for at least 4 hours (6 hours for the Northwest Territories and Nunavut)

== Types ==
There are three different forms of ground blizzards:

1. In horizontal advection conditions, the winds blow across the surface of the earth with very little if any large-scale upward motion.
2. In vertical advection conditions, the winds exhibit large-scale upward motion lifting the snow into the atmosphere creating drifting waves of snow up to 500 meters in height.
3. In thermal-mechanical mixing conditions, massive convective rolls form in the atmosphere and the blizzard may be observed from space with the blizzards convective rolls creating waves of snow (also known as snow billows) resembling lake or ocean effect snow bands. The extreme conditions can quickly bury a two-story home and make breathing very difficult if not impossible if caught outdoors.
  Strong advection rolls during a ground blizzard in North Dakota, January 15th, 1997

== Climatology ==
Ground blizzards occur throughout the world; however unlike other winter storms, topography either aids in their formation or prevention. The most important topographic element in a blizzard is the requirement for a vast amount of large open and relatively flat land. Any type of flora, especially coniferous forms, will catch any drifting snow reducing the blizzard's effects. The environment must also support temperatures cold enough to prevent any snow on the ground from melting and bonding the ice crystals together.

Ground blizzards are common in the American Great Plains in the wake of snowstorms producing light, dry snowfall that is more easily picked up by strong winds. They are also common in the Canadian Prairies, Siberia, Northern China, and also Arctic and Antarctic regions during seasonal transition periods, such as the spring and fall.

== Famous ground blizzards ==
- Blizzard of 1977 (Western New York and Southern Ontario)
