= October 1997 North American storm complex =

Severe weather event in October 1997

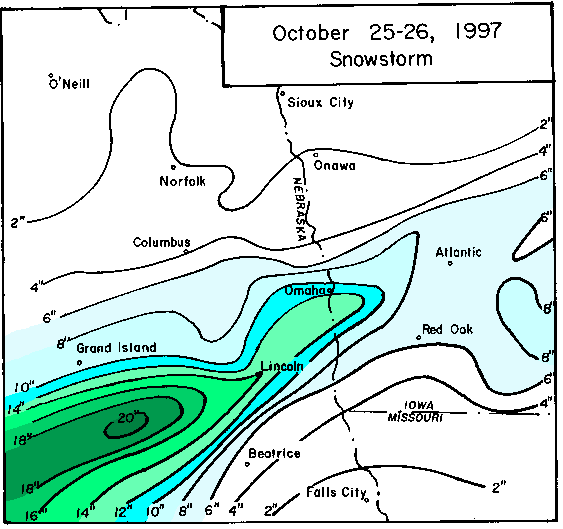
- Snowfall totals map of Eastern Nebraska

Meteorological history
- Formed: October 23, 1997
- Dissipated: October 31, 1997

Tornado outbreak
- Tornadoes: 84 confirmed
- Max. rating: F3 tornado
- Lowest pressure: 993 hPa (mbar); 29.32 inHg
- Max. snowfall: 52 in (130 cm) Palmer Lake, Colorado

Overall effects
- Casualties: 13 (snow)
- Damage: $50 million (1997 USD)
- Areas affected: Eastern two-thirds of North America and adjacent waters
- Power outages: 400,000
- Part of the 1997 North American winter storms

The October 1997 North American storm complex was a blizzard and tornado outbreak that affected the Northwest, Rockies, much of the Midwest and Deep South. 84 tornadoes were confirmed as the system moved eastward across the eastern half of the United States, including four that were rated as F3 on the Fujita scale.

The storms resulted in 13 deaths (five in Colorado, two each in Nebraska and Illinois, and one each in Michigan, Iowa, Oklahoma, and Kansas), and caused power outages and school closings lasting up to a week in affected areas. The event was famously billed by the University of Nebraska-Lincoln as being a "two-hundred year storm". The wind caused much damage, downing trees and power poles.

== Impact ==
A 400 miles (640 km) stretch of Interstate 80 between Big Springs, Nebraska and Rock Springs, Wyoming was closed, and Interstate 25 was also shut down in Colorado being shut down from Denver southward to the New Mexico border. Interstate 70 was also closed in Colorado from Denver east to the Kansas state line. Most airline flights at Denver International Airport were cancelled, as 14 inches (36 cm) of snow fell which prompted the airport to shut down, and Colorado governor Roy Romer declared a state of emergency and activated the Colorado National Guard to assist with relief efforts. 1,600 snowplows were also deployed to clear snow-covered roads. A college football game between Colorado State University and University of Tulsa in Fort Collins was snowed out, and mail service in Denver and Cheyenne, Wyoming was shut down. Palmer Lake, Colorado recorded 52 inches (130 cm) of snowfall, and Coal Creek Canyon, Colorado received 51 inches (130 cm) of snow. Seven people were killed and two others were injured in Colorado, and around 20,000 cattle and calves died. Many school districts across Colorado were closed in the aftermath of the winter storm. Wind gusts up to 60 miles per hour (97 km/h) caused wind chills between −25–40 °F (−32–4 °C) and snow drifts between 4–10 feet (48–120 in) in the state.

Nearly $50 million in damages and 300,000 power outages occurred across Nebraska and Iowa. An additional 100,000 power outages were in Colorado, with the majority of the outages centered in Pueblo.
