= 1997 April Fool's Day blizzard =

Winter storm in northeast United States

1997 April Fool’s Day blizzard
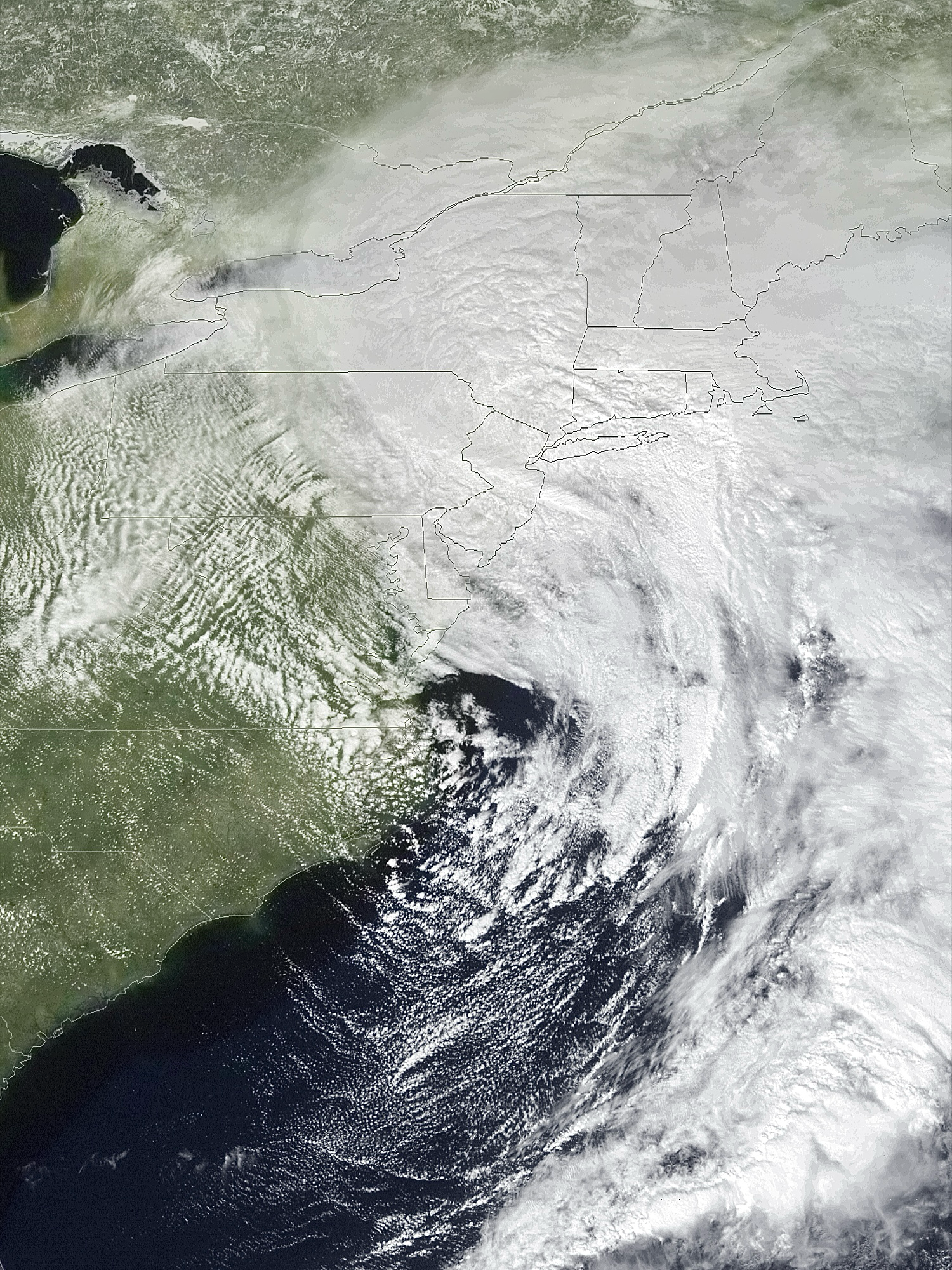
- The winter storm responsible for the blizzard on March 31

Meteorological history
- Formed: March 30, 1997
- Dissipated: April 1, 1997

Category 2 "Minor" blizzard
- Regional snowfall index: 4.67 (NOAA)
- Lowest pressure: 979 mbar

Overall effects
- Fatalities: 3 confirmed, 1 unconfirmed
- Areas affected: New England, Pennsylvania, New York, New Jersey
- Power outages: >70,000

The 1997 April Fool's Day blizzard was a major late-season winter storm that impacted the Northeastern United States from March 31 to April 1, 1997. The storm brought heavy rain, sleet, and snow from Maryland to Maine leaving hundreds of thousands without power and up to 3 feet of snow in areas.

Due to the timing of the storm, many people were skeptical, and took warnings about it less seriously. Most snowplows had already been put away for the summer and hardware stores were still selling shovels along side summer patio furniture. One commuter called it "Mother Nature's April Fools' Joke."

== Evolution of the storm ==
=== Formation ===
The storm started as a surface low pressure system over the Ohio River Valley that was generated by an area of strong jet stream energy carving out an active upper air low pressure trough on Sunday March 30. The low pressure system brought rain to much of the Ohio Valley.

When the storm arrived in eastern New York and western New England, the areas received light rain. The storm moved off the coast of New Jersey on March 31 and began rapidly strengthening. As the storm intensified, air began rising around the storm very rapidly, which cooled in the atmosphere and changed the rain into heavy snow. The low moved very slowly along the coast gaining strength throughout the day, and with a continuous supply of moisture, this allowed for an extended period of heavy snow.

=== Boston ===
Prior to the storm, Boston had received just 26.5 inches (67 cm) of snow for the season. On Sunday March 30, Boston was sunny with a high temperature of 63 °F (17 °C). A cold front passed early next day (Monday March 31), dropping the temperature into the 40s, and just before dawn light rain began to fall. In Boston the rain began to mix with wet snow mid-morning and eventually turned to wet snow and became heavier just after 7 p.m. From 7 p.m. to 11 p.m. the snow fell at at least 1 inch (2.5 cm) per hour.

During the peak of the storm from about 11 p.m. March 31 to 3 a.m. April 1, snow fell in Boston at the rate of 3 inches (7.6 cm) per hour. Numerous lightning strikes and thunderclaps accompanied the extremely heavy snow, which accumulated 1 foot (30 cm) in those four hours. Moderate to heavy snow continued through midmorning before tapering off.

== Impacts ==
=== New England ===
==== Precipitation received ====
At the time the 25.4 inches (65 cm) of snow that fell at Boston's Logan International Airport was the third-biggest snowstorm in Boston history, the Northeastern United States blizzard of 1978's 27.1 inches (69 cm), and the February 1969 nor'easter's 26.3 inches (67 cm). The storm was the biggest on record in the month of April and made April 1997 Boston's snowiest April on record, nearly doubling the previous record of 13.3 inches (34 cm). It also set a record for Boston's greatest April 24-hour snowfall. Parts of New England received 50-to-70-mile-per-hour (80 to 110 km/h) wind gusts at the height of the storm. Providence recorded 18 inches (46 cm) of snow which was the fourth greatest on record at the time. Other parts of New England reported more than 30 inches (76 cm) and up to three feet with Worcester receiving 33 inches (84 cm), the city's largest snowfall in history until 2015. With 36 inches (91 cm) in Milford, Massachusetts, the state set a 24 hour snowfall record.

==== Damage and travel disruptions ====
A state of emergency was declared by Massachusetts Gov. William F. Weld. The snow came down too fast for road crews to keep up with and roads became impassable and thousands of cars were stranded. Commuter trolleys in Boston were closed for the first time in nearly twenty years, public transportation was crippled, about 1,000 motorists spent the night stranded in their cars and 4,000 stayed in shelters. Some of the narrow side streets of Boston were completely buried and portions of Interstate 95 and Route 128 were shut down because of the snow. The main roads and highways were cleared within a couple of days but the secondary roads remained a mess making travel difficult. Two days after the storm, subways and commuter rails were still sluggish because of fallen trees and signal problems.

The wet and heavy snow caused tree limbs and even whole trees to fall. Some fell on power lines, and many people were left without power. Electricity was knocked out for nearly 700,000 people. Nearly 13% of New England lost power, mainly due to trees falling on power lines and utility poles. Power crews from as far away as Canada came to help clean up the area.

Logan Airport was also shut down from 2 p.m. March 31 to 10 p.m. April 1.

=== Mid-Atlantic ===
Upstate New York received 32 inches (81 cm) and in some parts of New Jersey two feet of snow fell causing delays on commuter trains. A disaster was declared in eight northeast counties by Pennsylvania Gov. Tom Ridge and the National Guard of the United States was dispatched to dig out cars. Interstate 84 had to be shut down because of a ten vehicle accident.

=== Injuries and deaths ===
Hospitals reported weather-related injuries including back sprains, pedestrians being hit by falling ice, and hand injuries including missing fingers from snow blowers. Three deaths were caused by the storm in Massachusetts and Rhode Island, all men who had heart attacks while shoveling, with another traffic death in New York which may have been caused by the weather.
