= December 1969 nor'easter =

Strong winter storm that affected the northeastern US

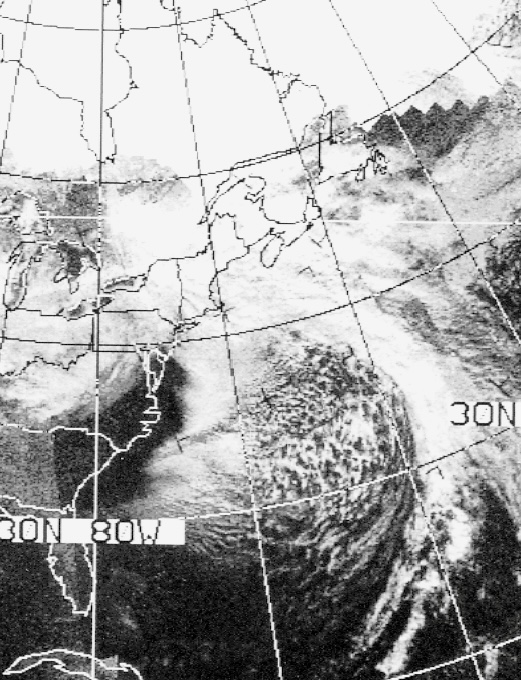
- Satellite imagery of the nor'easter on December 27

Meteorological history
- Formed: December 25, 1969
- Dissipated: December 28, 1969

Category 4 "Crippling" winter storm
- Regional snowfall index: 10.14 (NOAA)
- Highest gusts: 100 mph (160 km/h) near Cape Cod, Massachusetts
- Lowest pressure: 976 mbar (hPa); 28.82 inHg
- Max. rainfall: 4 in (10 cm) in Boston, Massachusetts
- Max. snowfall: Snow – 48 in (120 cm) in East Wallingford, Vermont; Ice – 2 inches (51 mm) in multiple regions

Tornado outbreak
- Tornadoes: 16
- Max. rating: F3 tornado
- Duration: December 25, 1969

Overall effects
- Fatalities: 37
- Damage: >$2 million (1969 USD)
- Areas affected: Southern United States, Mid-Atlantic and New England
- Power outages: >50,000

The December 1969 nor'easter was a strong winter storm that mainly affected the Northeastern United States and southern Quebec between December 25 and December 28, 1969. The multi-faceted storm system included a tornado outbreak, record snow accumulations, a damaging ice storm, and flooding rains.

The storm developed over Texas by December 25 and advanced eastward, spawning over a dozen tornadoes in Louisiana, Georgia, and Florida. Upon reaching the Eastern Seaboard, the cyclone turned northeastward and intensified into a powerful nor'easter. On December 26 and 27, the storm's forward movement slowed to a drift, causing very heavy snow over Upstate New York, Vermont, and southern Quebec. Warm onshore winds, caused by a storm track close to the shore, allowed precipitation to change to sleet and rain in central and eastern New England. Where precipitation remained as snow, accumulations reached 40 inches (100 cm) or more, crippling travel. Drifts up to 30 ft (9.1 m) high blocked roadways, isolating some communities and forcing emergency workers to rely on snowmobiles for transportation. At least 20 fatalities were attributed to the storm in New York and New England.

In central New England, a severe freezing rain event occurred along the boundary between cold air to the west and warmer air to the east. Several inches of glaze ice, accompanied by gale-force winds, caused damage comparable to the aftermath of the 1938 New England hurricane. Throughout the region, the snow and ice—in some cases further weighted by heavy rainfall—caused roofs to cave in. Montreal received 27.5 in (70 cm) of snow in that city's biggest snowstorm on record at the time; officials blamed the storm for 15 deaths in Quebec. In eastern New England, ice jams, poor drainage, and several inches of rain caused flooding that forced people from their homes and submerged roadways. Wind gusts to 100 mph (160 km/h) and strong waves battered the coastline.

== Background ==
The winter of 1969–1970 continued a long-term El Niño from the previous winter, which featured two significant storms in the Northeastern United States, including the "Lindsay storm" in February. North Atlantic Oscillation (NAO) values ranged from weakly negative to weakly positive in the period leading up to the storm, trending more consistently negative in the days surrounding its genesis. NAO values dropped significantly in the wake of the nor'easter, signaling abnormally cold temperatures during January 1970. December 1969 was a month of active weather throughout the Northeast, with frequent light to moderate snow events preceding the late-month nor'easter. A significant storm on December 22–23 dropped 8 to 24 in (20 to 60 cm) of snow in eastern New York and northern New England, as well as significant freezing rain in southern and eastern New England. Many of the same areas would be impacted again just days later.

Before the cyclone's arrival, a 1,033 hPa (30.5 inHg) high-pressure area situated north of New England funneled very cold air into the region; the −22 °F (−30 °C) air temperature at Albany, New York, on December 25 still holds the record for the city's coldest December temperature. On December 25 and 26, extensive cold air damming and frontogenesis occurred along the U.S. East Coast. The high-pressure area slowly retreated as the storm approached.

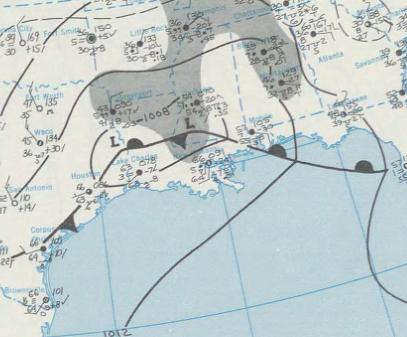
Map of the developing low-pressure system north of the Gulf of Mexico on December 25

== Meteorological history ==
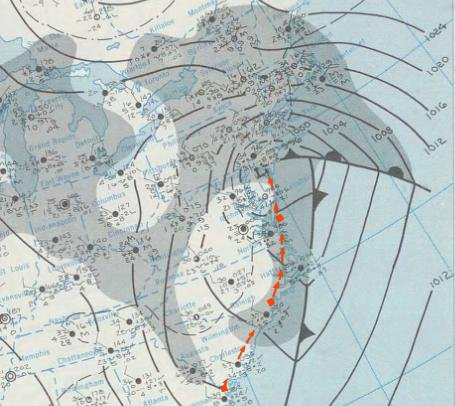
Surface weather analysis of the nor'easter on December 26, with its track highlighted in red

The nor'easter originated in a weak area of surface low pressure that formed over northern Texas by December 25. It moved generally eastward over the next day as it crossed the Deep South. A southerly low-level jet (a localized wind stream in the lower levels of the atmosphere) developed by midday over Mississippi and Alabama, and drifted eastward. Precipitation soon blossomed, with heavy snow falling over the Appalachian Mountains by late on December 25. The low turned toward the northeast by early on December 26 to follow the temperature gradient along the East Coast, at which time the storm underwent the first of two periods of rapid intensification. In 12 hours, barometric pressure fell 12 hPa to 996 hPa (29.4 inHg) while the nor'easter accelerated from Georgia to the coast of New Jersey. This bout of strengthening occurred as the associated upper-level trough at the 500-millibar level – several miles into the atmosphere – assumed a negative tilt from northwest to southeast. Heavy precipitation overspread the Mid-Atlantic and New England early on December 26.

The low-level jet continued to strengthen and delivered warm air to areas east of the storm center, where precipitation quickly transitioned to rain. The jet ultimately reached extremely high velocities of 55 m/s (120 mph) as it wrapped around the northern side of the low, feeding abundant moisture into areas of heavy precipitation. The storm slowed drastically on December 26, and over the next 24 hours, it moved very slowly from Cape May, New Jersey, to near Boston, Massachusetts. During this period, exceptionally heavy snow fell over eastern New York, Vermont, and southern Quebec. While located just east of Long Island on December 27, the nor'easter began its second phase of rapid strengthening that brought central pressure down to 976 hPa (28.8 inHg). During this period of intensification, snow propagated around the western side of the system, reaching as far south as Long Island.

With a storm track very close to the shore and a retreating high-pressure area to the northeast, onshore winds allowed temperatures to warm above freezing in eastern and northern New England. A frontal boundary between the warm Atlantic air and a residual wedge of colder air over the interior served as the focus for a severe ice storm in central New England. Thunder and lightning accompanied the precipitation in some areas. By 12:00 UTC on December 27, the attendant upper-level trough matured into a closed cold-core low. The nor'easter continued to drift toward the east-northeast over the next 24 hours.

== Impact and aftermath ==
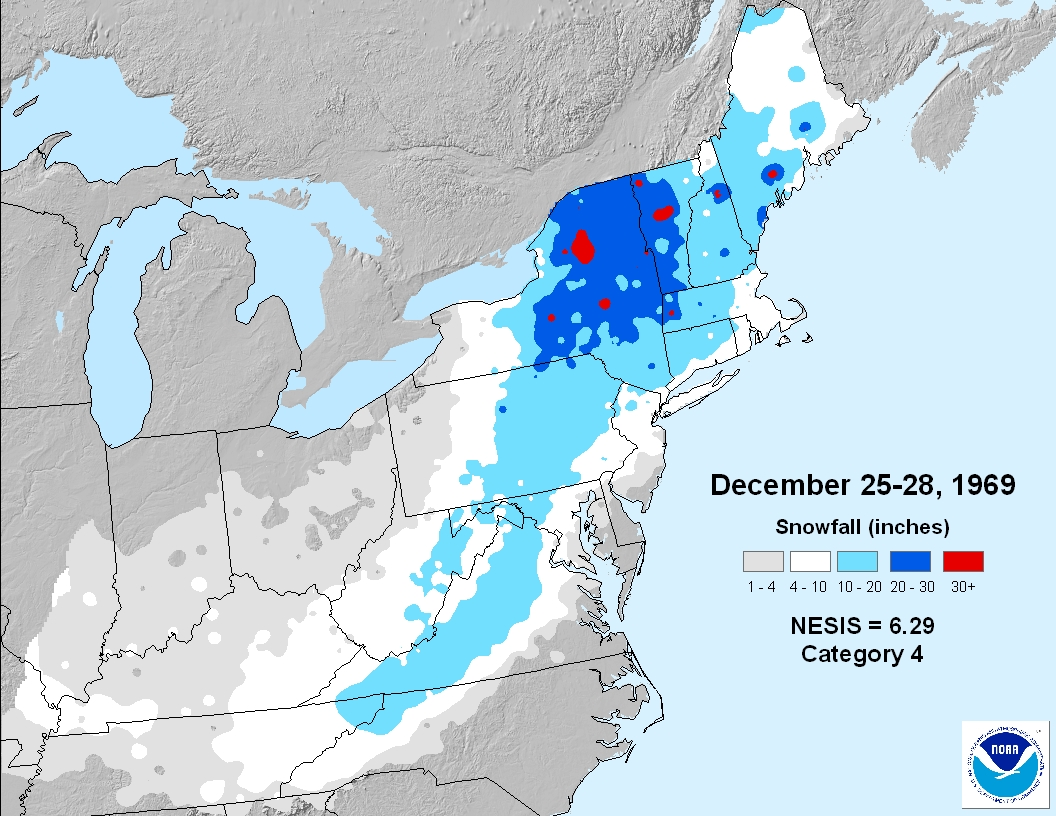
United States snowfall map from the National Climatic Data Center

=== Southeast U.S. and Mid-Atlantic ===
The developing extratropical cyclone spawned 16 known tornadoes and waterspouts in Louisiana, Georgia, and Florida, becoming the largest Christmas Day tornado outbreak on record. A short-lived F3 tornado touched down in Vermillion Parish, Louisiana, destroying eight homes near Kaplan and damaging 25 more. One woman was killed and eight were injured, three severely enough to require hospitalization. Another damaging tornado moved through several settlements in southern Iberville Parish just over two hours later; the tornado destroyed seven homes and damaged multiple other buildings, with one injury reported. The tornado was officially classified an F3, though meteorologist Thomas P. Grazulis determined it to have caused damage consistent with an F2 rating. A non-tornadic wind gust destroyed a nearby trailer home. Later that day, a tornado skipped along a path through Catahoula and Concordia parishes, touching down three different times. The F2 tornado damaged about 20 trailer homes in Glade, and caused further damage near the end of its track.

A tornado in southern Georgia, about 9 mi (14 km) west of Albany, damaged or destroyed several small homes, killed three head of cattle, toppled numerous trees, and injured seven people. Elsewhere in the state, there were isolated reports of hail and damaging thunderstorm winds. Several tornadoes in the Florida Panhandle caused minor to moderate damage to trees and homes, the most destructive of them occurring in Quincy, Florida. That tornado struck an industrial area and unroofed at least three structures. A tornado in Lee, Florida, destroyed a trailer, damaged farm buildings, and injured one person.

In addition to widespread rain, parts of northern South Carolina experienced freezing rain that damaged trees and power lines. Freezing rain and sleet fell over the southern Piedmont of North Carolina, resulting in power outages and dangerous travel conditions. At least one fatal traffic accident was reported. Heavy snow covered the northwest Piedmont and Mountain Region of the state, accumulating to around 12 in (30 cm) at Asheville; occurring on the heels of another winter storm, this snowfall contributed to depths up to 2 ft (60 cm) at higher elevations. High winds from the storm left at least 50,000 electric customers in the Richmond, Virginia region without power. In Carroll County, strong winds uprooted trees. Significant snow accumulations occurred throughout the Mid-Atlantic, chiefly away from the coastal plain. Snowfall exceeded 10 in (25 cm) in parts of western Virginia, western Maryland, and West Virginia; Washington, D.C. received 12.1 in (31 cm) of snow.

=== Northeast U.S. ===
The cyclone was rated by meteorology researchers Kocin and Uccellini (2004) as a high-end Category 3 on the Northeast Snowfall Impact Scale, equating to a "major" winter storm. However, more recent data from the National Climatic Data Center classifies the nor'easter as a low-end "crippling" Category 4. By December 30, at least 20 deaths in New York and New England had been attributed to the storm, largely from traffic accidents and physical exhaustion.

Areas of northeastern Pennsylvania, eastern New York, and Vermont received snowfall in excess of 20 in (51 cm), including 29.8 in (760 mm) at Burlington, 26.4 in (67 cm) at Albany, and 21.9 in (56 cm) at Binghamton, New York. Accumulations locally exceeded 40 in (100 cm), with 45 in (110 cm) measured at Waitsfield, Vermont and 48 in (120 cm) in the small village of East Wallingford, Vermont. The storm remains one of the greatest on record in cities like Albany and Burlington, and contributed to high monthly snowfall totals; in Albany, December 1969 stands as the snowiest documented month, with 57.5 in (146 cm). Throughout the region, the weight of the snow, combined with gale-force winds, collapsed roofs and brought down power lines. The winds blew snow from this and previous storms into drifts as high as 30 ft (9 m), blocking roads and leaving some communities isolated. In some areas, travel was only possible with snowmobiles, which were used by emergency workers to deliver emergency supplies as needed. Rescuers also used snowmobiles and aircraft to search for stranded residents and travelers. Many cities and counties throughout the Northeast issued snow emergencies. Business and industry suffered extensively in the days following the storm.

While major highways were generally cleared by December 29, some local roads reportedly remained covered for up to a month. About 230 mi (370 km) of the New York State Thruway—nearly half its total length—was closed for 27 hours. The snowfall also caused widespread property damage, as the roofs of barns, sheds, and other buildings caved in under the weight of the snow. An airport hangar in Oneonta collapsed, destroying five aircraft inside. In the aftermath of the storm, many homes sustained water damage from melting snow. "Innumerable" traffic accidents were reported, and many motorists became stranded or were forced to abandon their vehicles. Four people in a stalled automobile died of carbon monoxide poisoning. Also in New York, one man froze to death, and three individuals were killed in a building collapse. In the Capital District, the snow fell with a high water content, occasionally mixing with freezing rain. As a result, it was much denser than normal and proved difficult to manage. The City of Albany spent a record US$2 million on snow removal, and the city restricted nearly all traffic except for vehicles necessary to maintain emergency supplies. Governor Nelson Rockefeller closed state offices in Albany on December 29 and 30, in an effort to enable efficient snow removal. Mayor Erastus Corning 2nd assessed the situation as a "dire emergency".

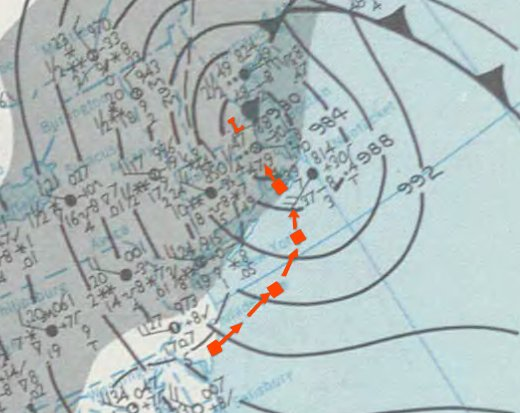
Map of the nor'easter on December 27 over eastern New England

Governor Deane C. Davis of Vermont declared a state of emergency and ordered the National Guard to assist with cleanup efforts. Blowing snow continuously blocked roads after being cleared, and snow removal vehicles, not equipped to withstand the excessive snow, began experiencing mechanical issues. The storm left some communities without power or telephone service for up to two days, although isolated outages persisted longer. One person died in Saxtons River. With roads impassable in both New York and New England, tank trucks could not reach dairy farmers, who were in some cases forced to discard thousands of gallons of milk. In other cases, power outages rendered equipment useless, requiring milking to be done manually. One person in New Hampshire died of exhaustion during the storm.

The influx of warm, moist air over a wedge of cold air near the surface resulted in a severe ice storm across central and northern New England, most notably in the upper Connecticut River Valley. Glaze ice thicker than 2 in (51 mm), and reportedly up to 6 in (150 mm) thick in Vermont, built up on trees and power lines, wreaking "unbelievable" havoc. In the hardest-hit areas, damage from the ice storm was comparable to that caused by the 1938 New England hurricane. The combined load of snow and ice caused significant damage to many residential and industrial buildings, with several factory and warehouse roofs collapsing. Livestock were killed in multiple rural building collapses throughout the area. Southern Maine endured its second damaging ice storm in a week, with many of the same communities losing power on both occasion. Precipitation also transitioned to freezing rain and sleet across interior Connecticut, where the dangerous conditions induced numerous traffic accidents. Due to the abnormally cold temperatures in the wake of the storm, the glaze persisted for up to six weeks, much longer than the typical three days for ice storms in New England.

The changeover to heavy rain in southern and eastern New England swelled frozen rivers, creating ice jams which induced severe flooding. Flooding of roadways and homes was compounded by drainage issues from the dense snowcover. Rising floodwaters forced hundreds of families to leave their homes in Massachusetts, New Hampshire, and Maine. Up to 4 in (100 mm) of rain fell in the Boston region, where thousands of homes were inundated. Rivers had begun to recede by December 29 after cresting well above flood stage. Up to 4 in (100 mm) of rain fell over Rhode Island after 6 to 11 in (15 to 28 cm) of snow, with widespread flooding reported in multiple towns. Frequent automobile accidents and large traffic jams were reported in the state. Winds were strongest in Cape Cod, Massachusetts, where gusts peaked near 100 mph (160 km/h). The gales were particularly damaging to trees laden with snow and ice. The heavy rainfall in eastern Massachusetts added tremendous weigh to the snow that had already fallen, causing roof collapses and making it difficult to clear the snow. In southeastern New Hampshire, the strong winds toppled trees and blew out windows in Hampton Beach. Although the coastal plain of New England avoided the heaviest snow accumulations, pounding surf and strong winds battered piers, boats, and other coastal installations, while low-lying areas experienced storm surge flooding.

=== Quebec ===
The storm dropped up to 30 in (75 cm) of snow in southern Quebec, where wind gusts up to 50 mph (80 km/h) damaged buildings and brought down power lines. Over a period of 60 hours, 27.5 in (70 cm) of snow fell at Montreal in what was then the city's heaviest snowfall on record. Rail, air, and automobile transportation were paralyzed. One individual in Quebec City was struck and killed by a snowplow, and two more died of exposure to cold while ice fishing on the St. Lawrence River. Several fires broke out in Montreal during the storm, killing at least six people and leaving 23 families homeless. In total, the storm was connected to at least 15 fatalities in the province.

== See also ==
- Climate of the United States
- List of Northeast Snowfall Impact Scale winter storms
