= The Great Snow of 1717 =

1717 snowstorms in North America

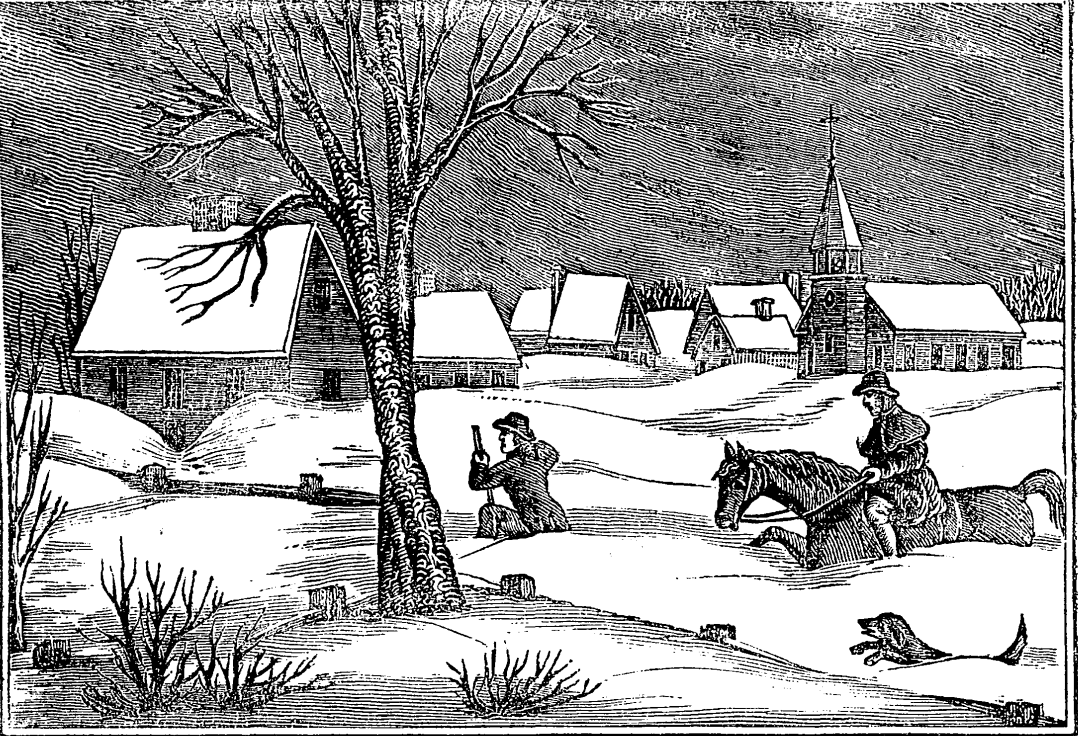

The Great Snow of 1717 was a series of snowstorms between February 27 and March 7, 1717 (Gregorian calendar) that blanketed the colony of Virginia and the New England colonies with five or more feet (1.5 or more meters) of snow, and much higher drifts. Snowfall may have occurred elsewhere, but settler population was sparse outside of New England at that time. The Great Snow is considered one of the benchmark storms in New England, often compared to the Great Blizzard of 1888 in severity.

The Great Snow, depending on the source, began on February 27 or March 1. On February 27 a typical New England nor'easter passed through, with snow falling on some areas and other places receiving a mix of snow, sleet, and rain. The first major snowstorm occurred on March 1, with another on the 4th, and a third, the worst among the three, on the 7th. At some points, the snow would lighten and stop, but the sky would remain cloudy, showing no signs of clearing.

Some of the oldest Native Americans said that even their ancestors had never spoken of a storm of this magnitude. Boston received around 40 inches (100 cm) of snow, while some places north of the city reached up to 60 inches (150 cm). In Hampton, New Hampshire, the snow was so deep that people could only leave their houses from the second floor on the lee side of the house, implying actual snow depths of as much as 8 feet (2.4 m) or more. Many single-story homes were buried completely, without even the chimney showing. On the larger residences, drifts reached the third-story window on the windward side. Large expanses of snow were 10–15 feet (3.0–4.6 m) deep, with some significant drifts 20 feet (6.1 m) deep.

The post roads were impassable until at least March 15, with the mailmen describing snow drifts 6–14 feet (1.8–4.3 m) from Boston to Portsmouth more than a week after the storm. Travel was also impossible for a time from New York City to Boston.

The geographic scope of the storm is unknown, due to the scarce population and poor record-keeping of the day. Most information is known only from private diaries. The snow was known to be several feet deep around Philadelphia, New York City, New London, Connecticut, Boston and Portsmouth, New Hampshire.

== Damage and losses ==
Many livestock lost their lives, either starving or freezing to death under tremendous drifts of snow. As many as 90–95% of the deer in the area died, either from starvation or predators, leading to many towns appointing "deer-reeves" to ensure their preservation. Many orchards were damaged, since the snow covered even the tops of many trees, and animals would graze among the upper branches where they usually could not.
