= March 1969 nor'easter =

Extratropical cyclone

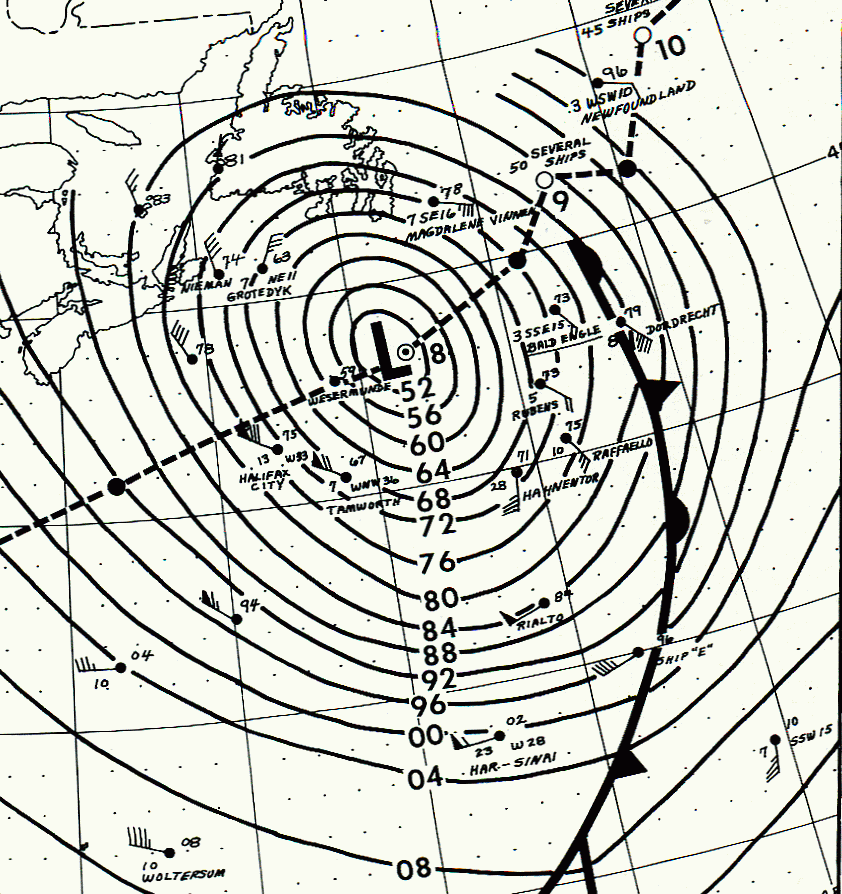
A surface weather analysis of the storm when near its peak intensity on the morning of March 8, 1969

The March 1969 nor'easter was an extratropical cyclone that moved into the Gulf of Mexico on March 5, moving through southern Georgia, then deepened as it moved along the lower Eastern Seaboard, before swinging wide of New England and Atlantic Canada. Heavy snows fell across eastern Maryland, southern Delaware, and Martha's Vineyard in Massachusetts. It was a strong system, with maximum sustained winds of 80 kn (150 km/h) a central pressure close to 950 hPa (28 inHg) while south of Atlantic Canada. The system then moved into the far northern Atlantic Ocean while splitting into two low pressure areas on March 10.

== Evolution ==
Late on March 5, a frontal wave moved offshore Galveston, Texas. The system moved along the Gulf coast on March 6. Gale-force winds were confined to behind its prefrontal squall line on March 6. The cyclone moved along the Florida-Georgia border with a central pressure down to 995.0 hectopascals (29.38 inHg). The low tracked up the Eastern Seaboard from the late on the 6th through the morning of the 7th while strengthening quickly, with its central pressure falling to 969.0 hectopascals (28.61 inHg), then with storm-force winds offshore Cape Charles, Virginia. The cyclone tracked offshore New England. By the morning of the 8th, the cyclone's center pressure had fallen to 950.0 hPa (28.05 inHg) while the system developed maximum sustained winds of 80 knots (150 km/h) south of Newfoundland. During the day, the cyclone absorbed a previously strong cyclone to its north near Anticosti Island. The system slowly weakened while moving slowly northeast offshore eastern Newfoundland on the 9th and 10th, losing hurricane-force winds on the 9th. The system split into two distinct low pressure centers on 10th as it approached southern Greenland.

== Impact ==
The cyclone's pre-frontal squall line moved into western Florida between 4:30 and 6:00 p.m. on March 6. Winds gusted to between 45 miles per hour (72 km/h) and 60 miles per hour (97 km/h) across Sarasota and Levy counties. Tides rose to between 3 feet (0.91 m) and 4 feet (1.2 m) above normal. Damage caused was between $50,000 and $500,000. A heavy wet snow fell across the Eastern Shore of Maryland and the southern half of Delaware from late on March 6 into March 7, up to a depth of 7 inches (18 cm) in Maryland and 12.5 inches (32 cm) in Lewes, Delaware. At Martha's Vineyard, heavy snow and winds up to 50 miles per hour (80 km/h) created snow drifts exceeding 3 feet (0.91 m) in height.
