= Saskatchewan blizzard of 2007 =

Weather event in Canada

Saskatchewan Blizzard of 2007
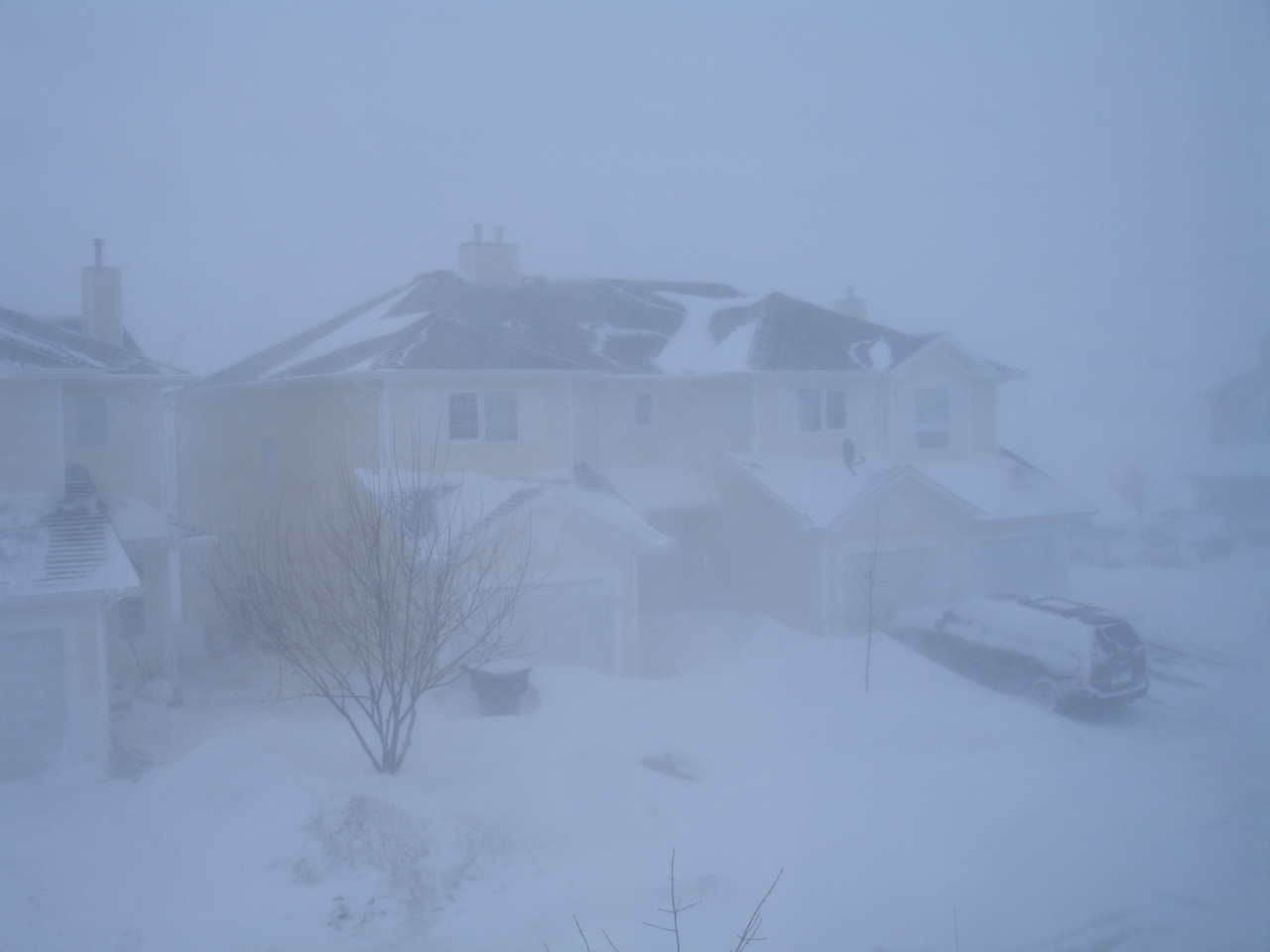
- Blizzard in Saskatoon on January 10, 2007

Meteorological history
- Formed: January 9, 2007
- Dissipated: January 11, 2007

Blizzard
- Highest winds: 90 km/h
- Maximum snowfall or ice accretion: 55 cm (22 in)

Overall effects
- Fatalities: 2
- Damage: $1 million CAD
- Areas affected: British Columbia, Alberta, Saskatchewan

The Saskatchewan Blizzard of 2007 was a winter storm that struck northeastern British Columbia, central Alberta and central Saskatchewan on Wednesday, January 10, 2007. The storm hit the city of Saskatoon severely and is considered to be one of the worst storms in Saskatchewan's history. It brought motor vehicle traffic to a standstill, stranded people and shut down many public services. There were two fatalities from the storm.

Blizzard conditions shut down airports in Prince Albert and Saskatoon. Road conditions were poor during the storm, and highways around Saskatoon, North Battleford, Melfort and Wynyard were closed. Unionized highway snowplow operators, who had been on strike at the time, returned to work in the interest of public safety. City streets in Saskatoon were also clogged with snow, slowing traffic. Some roads in the city's outer periphery were impassable due to high drifts. 14 major intersections were closed or deemed impassable.

All branches of Saskatoon's public library closed in the afternoon as did city leisure facilities, indoor skating rinks and public schools. Several businesses allowed their employees to go home early, while the University of Saskatchewan shut down along with SIAST Kelsey campus and government agencies. Hotels were filled with stranded travellers and city residents who could not drive home because of the inclement conditions. Some people resorted to taking refuge overnight in businesses such as Costco.

Emergency services spent the day responding to accidents, rescuing stranded motorists from stuck vehicles, and closing roads. SaskTel's cellular telephone network was overloaded with calls, prompting the Saskatoon fire department to urge the public to refrain from using mobile phones in all but emergency situations.

== Aftermath ==
Two people died in the storm. An 18-year-old man and 38-year-old woman, both from the Onion Lake Cree Nation, were caught in the blizzard and died from hypothermia after attempting to walk home from their vehicle.

Total cost of the cleanup was approximately $1 million.

== Records ==
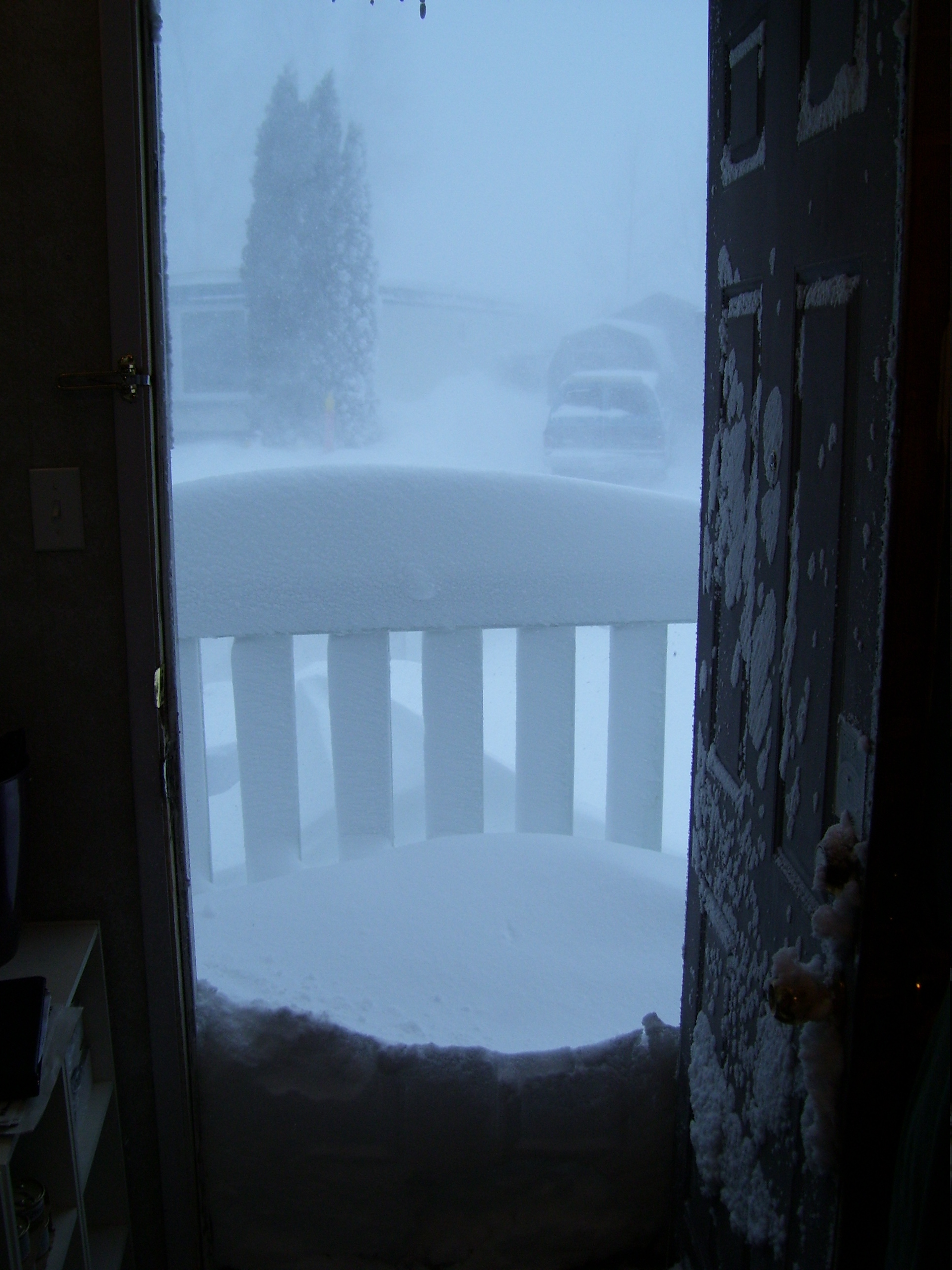
Whiteout, accumulation, and snowdrift from the blizzard, as seen through an open door.

The single day record snowfall in Saskatoon for the date of January 10 was shattered by this storm. 25 centimetres (9.8 in) of snow fell during the blizzard, far surpassing the old record of 10.2 centimetres (4.0 in) set back in 1938.
