= February 1969 nor'easter =

1969 storm in the United States

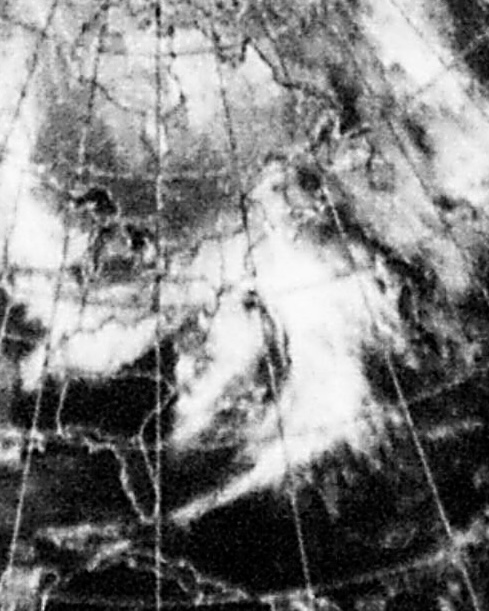
- Satellite imagery of the nor'easter off the Jersey Shore on February 9

Meteorological history
- Formed: February 8, 1969
- Dissipated: February 10, 1969

Category 2 "Minor" winter storm
- Regional snowfall index: 4.53 (NOAA)
- Lowest pressure: 970 mbar (hPa); 28.64 inHg
- Max. snowfall: 42 in (110 cm)

Overall effects
- Fatalities: 94
- Areas affected: Mid-Atlantic and New England

A severe nor'easter affected the Mid-Atlantic and New England regions of the United States between February 8 and February 10, 1969. The nor'easter dropped paralyzing snowfall, exceeding 20 in (51 cm) in many places. New York City bore the brunt of the storm, suffering extensive disruption. Thousands of travelers became stranded on roads and in airports. The storm killed at least 94 people. City schools were closed for several days and some areas of the city remained uncleared for over a week. New York Mayor John Lindsay was criticized for failing to respond to the snowstorm adequately, and is thus colloquially known as the "Lindsay Storm" to residents of New York City.

== Meteorological history ==
An area of low pressure moved generally eastward from Oklahoma and produced heavy rains from Missouri to Ohio on February 8. By February 9, it had reached Kentucky. A new, secondary low pressure system formed over Georgia along the warm front associated with the primary low. As the secondary low matured along the U.S. East Coast, the initial center weakened rapidly, and heavy rainfall developed over the Carolinas in association with the new low. Mixed precipitation soon spread across the Mid-Atlantic States, and heavy snow began to fall from New Jersey northward by 1200 UTC on February 9.

The primary low dissipated, and the secondary low continued to intensify as it moved northeastward from the North Carolina coast to Long Island. Its forward motion slowed substantially, leading to increased precipitation totals over land. By 0000 UTC on February 10, the storm deepened to 970 millibars, having strengthened 32 millibars in an 18-hour period. At 1200 UTC, it was situated off Cape Cod, still an intense cyclone. On February 11, the storm moved out of the region.

== Impact ==
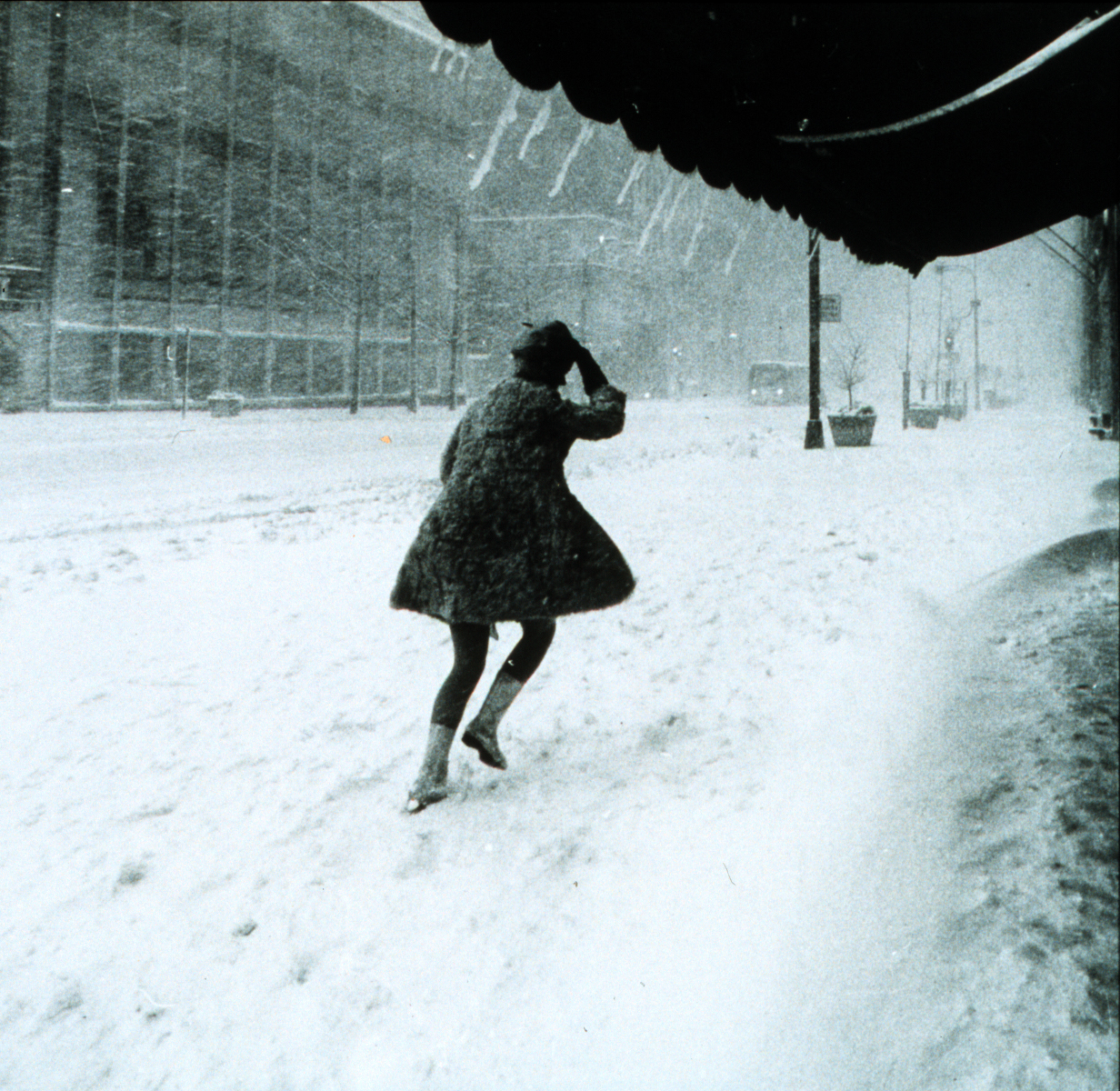
Manhattan's empty streets during the storm, February 10

The storm produced paralyzing snowfall from New Jersey through most of New England. Forecasts severely underestimated the duration of the storm, often predicting just a chance of snow. The highest totals—often exceeding 42 in (110 cm)—were reported in the Bangor, Maine, area; Lewiston, Maine, topping 32 in (81 cm). Lesser accumulations up to 20 in (51 cm)—occurred in areas south to western Connecticut, Massachusetts, southern Vermont, northern Rhode Island, and eastern New Hampshire. Lighter snowfall extended as far south as central Virginia, and as far west as Indiana. The snow was accompanied by high winds, in some areas reaching 45 mph (72 km/h). Heavy snow and gale warnings were declared across the region. Tides along the coast ran 2 to 3 ft (0.61 to 0.91 m) above normal during the storm.

New York City was struck particularly hard by the storm. Central Park reported 15 inches (38 cm) of snow, and John F. Kennedy International Airport reported 20 inches (51 cm). It is estimated that 42 people perished, and several hundred more people were injured. The storm disrupted the city for days, and forced schools to close. Streets throughout Queens became impassable; mail service, buses, taxis, delivery vehicles, and trash collection were all disrupted. Thousands of motorists became trapped on the New York State Thruway. A snow emergency was issued in the city, and the Long Island Rail Road suspended all service at the time. The snowstorm left approximately 6,000 travelers stranded at Kennedy Airport. They slept on chairs and floors. Over 1,000 vehicles were stalled or abandoned on the Tappan Zee Bridge; most of these were removed within a day.

Overall, at least 94 deaths were attributed to the storm. Throughout the region, the lack of delivery trucks also led to a shortage of food staples such as milk and bread.

== Aftermath ==
Following the storm, mayor John Lindsay was criticized for not dealing with the snow adequately. Portions of the city remained unplowed a week after the nor'easter, leading the mayor into "political misfortune". Lindsay's visit to Queens was poorly received, and his limousine had trouble driving through the streets of Rego Park. The mayor was booed by residents of Kew Gardens Hills. The storm became known as the "Lindsay Snowstorm", and created a political crisis; as a result, Lindsay lost the Republican primary for the next mayoral election. Lindsay was able to win the mayoral election by running on a third-party ticket, but he was politically weakened by the crisis.

The storm also had an economic impact. The New York Stock Exchange (NYSE) and American Stock Exchange (AMEX) closed as a result of the storm. It was the first time in history that the NYSE closed for a full day due to the weather, and the first time since 1918 that AMEX had done so. All commodity exchanges in New York City and the National Association of Securities Dealers also closed.

== See also ==
- Climate of the United States
- List of NESIS storms
