= Blizzard of 2006 =

Several notable blizzards occurred in 2006.

- The North American blizzard of 2006, which delivered record snowfall to New York City
- The Early Winter 2006 North American Storm Complex affected parts of southern Canada in December
- The December 20-21, 2006 Colorado Blizzard struck Colorado and some surrounding areas on December 20-21
- The October Surprise Storm in Western New York
