= WEZC =

Radio station in Clinton, Illinois

- Clinton, Illinois; United States
- Broadcast area: Central Illinois
- Frequency: 95.9 MHz
- Branding: 95.9 WEZC

Programming
- Format: Soft oldies; Adult Standards
- Affiliations: Westwood One

Ownership
- Owner: Miller Media Group; (Kaskaskia Broadcasting, Inc.)
- Sister stations: WHOW

History
- First air date: December 15, 1975
- Former call signs: WHOW-FM (1979–2008)
- Call sign meaning: EZ hits in Clinton, Illinois

Technical information
- Licensing authority: FCC
- Facility ID: 13901
- Class: A
- ERP: 6,000 watts
- HAAT: 94 meters (308 ft)
- Transmitter coordinates: 40°05′43″N 88°57′51″W

Links
- Public license information: Public file; LMS
- Website: dewittdailynews.com/community/wezc

WEZC (95.9 MHz) is a commercial FM radio station licensed to Clinton, Illinois. It is owned by the Miller Media Group and the broadcast license is held by Kaskaskia Broadcasting, Inc. WEZC has a soft oldies - adult standards radio format and is a network affiliate of "America's Best Music" a satellite-delivered service from Westwood One.

WEZC has an effective radiated power (ERP) of 6,000 watts. It broadcasts using HD Radio technology. WEZC carries WHOW talk and farm programming on its HD-2 digital subchannel, which feeds W222BG, an FM translator station at 92.3 MHz, so that WHOW can be heard around the clock on FM.

== History ==
On December 15, 1975, the station signed on as WHOW-FM, the FM counterpart to WHOW 1520 AM. It was originally powered with 3,000 watts of effective radiated power (ERP) and licensed to Cornbelt Broadcasting Company. WHOW-AM-FM broadcast from an office building at their shared tower site, four miles (6 km) south of Clinton, built to resemble a "big red barn".

In 2002, both WHOW and WHOW-FM temporarily shut down due to complaints from the FCC about the two stations' tower. It needed significant upgrades to get the stations back on the air but the Livesay Family could not afford the repairs.

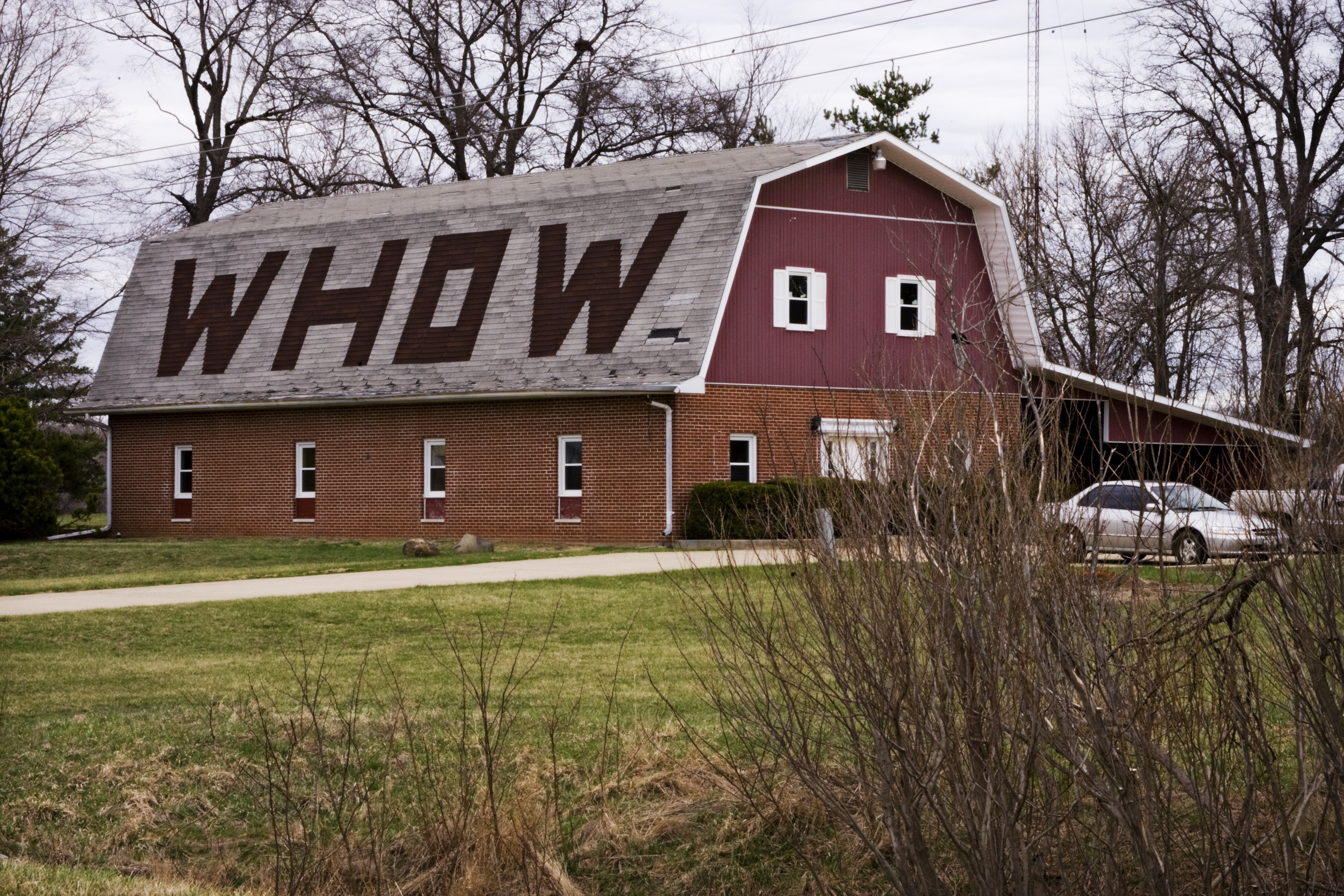
WHOW/WEZC's Big Red Barn studios (2009)

After nearly a quarter-century of ownership, the Cornbelt Broadcasting Company (James R. Livesay II, president) reached an agreement in December 2003 to transfer the broadcast license for WHOW-AM-FM to WHOW Radio, LLC (William E. Brady, manager/member) for a reported combined sale price of $300,000. The deal was approved by the FCC on January 26, 2004, and the transaction was consummated on February 9, 2004. At the time of the sale, both stations were dark for reported financial reasons.

In September 2004, WHOW-FM adopted a sports radio format while the AM station focused on farm, news and talk programming.

An ice storm, part of the Early Winter 2006 North American Storm Complex, struck the Central Illinois region on November 30, 2006. On December 1, the broadcast tower shared by WHOW-FM and its AM counterpart collapsed under the weight of the accumulated ice. The AM station was able to return to the air at reduced power a few days later using a longwire antenna while WHOW-FM resumed broadcasting from a makeshift 60-foot (18 m) tower on December 8. The station received special temporary authority (STA) from the FCC in January 2007 to operate in this manner until a new, permanent tower could be constructed.

ESPN Radio 95.9 logo

The extensive damage and the station combo's struggling finances forced the WHOW Radio, LLC, partners, led by Illinois state senator Bill Brady, to sell the station to local media group owner Randy Miller. In October 2007, WHOW Radio, LLC, announced an agreement to sell WHOW-FM to Kaskaskia Broadcasting, Inc. (Randy Miller, president) as part of a two-station deal along with AM sister station WHOW for a reported $400,000. Kaskaskia Broadcasting, Inc., is part of the Miller Media Group. The deal was approved by the FCC on December 7, 2007, and the transaction was consummated on January 4, 2008. At the time of the sale, WHOW-FM was branded as "ESPN Radio 95.9".

WHOW-FM, still broadcasting from a temporary tower while the new tower was being erected, received an extension of its special temporary authorization on January 17, 2008. Both the AM and FM stations returned to full power operation on February 25, 2008.

The station was assigned the current WEZC call sign by the FCC on December 26, 2008. The call letters were chosen to reflect the station's "EZ hits" branded soft oldies and adult standards format, while the C stands for Clinton, Illinois.
