= Colorado Blizzard =

Colorado Blizzard may refer to:

- Colorado Holiday Blizzards (2006–2007), major storms during late December 2006 in the Denver, Colorado, area
- Colorado Springs Blizzard, a team in the USL Premier Development League
