= WNWS =

WNWS refers to the following broadcasting stations in the United States:

- WNWS (AM), a radio station (1520 AM) licensed to Brownsville, Tennessee
- WNWS-FM, a radio station (101.5 FM) licensed to Jackson, Tennessee
- WAXY (AM), a radio station (790 AM) licensed to South Miami, Florida, which held the call sign WNWS from 1976 to 1990
- WQHT, a radio station (97.1 FM) licensed to New York, New York, which held the call sign WNWS-FM from 1975 to 1977
