= WHOW =

- Clinton, Illinois; United States
- Frequency: 1520 kHz
- Branding: The Big 1520

Programming
- Format: farm news and talk radio
- Affiliations: Salem Radio Network; Westwood One Network; CBS Radio News

Ownership
- Owner: Miller Media Group; (Kaskaskia Broadcasting, Inc.)
- Sister stations: WEZC

Technical information
- Licensing authority: FCC
- Facility ID: 13900
- Class: D
- Power: 5,000 watts day 1,000 watts critical hours
- ERP: 250 watts
- Transmitter coordinates: 40°05′43″N 88°57′51″W
- Translators: W222BG (92.3 MHz); W293DJ (106.5 MHz, Lincoln)

Links
- Public license information: Public file; LMS
- Website: dewittdailynews.com

WHOW (1520 kHz, "The Big 1520") is a commercial AM radio station licensed to Clinton, Illinois, United States. The station, established in 1947, is owned by the Miller Media Group and the broadcast license is held by Kaskaskia Broadcasting, Inc. WHOW is a daytime-only station broadcasting on the United States clear-channel frequency of 1520 AM. It must sign-off at night to protect Class A WWKB Buffalo, New York, and KOKC Oklahoma City.

WHOW broadcasts a farm news and talk radio format branded as "The Big 1520". The station airs local news and public affairs programs, agricultural news, and a tradio program called "RFD Trading Post". WHOW places special emphasis on serving the farm community of Central Illinois with a weekday morning farm show, live and local agriculture talk shows, a syndicated noon farm show, "The Horse Show", and frequent market reports.

Weekday syndicated talk programming includes Michael Medved, Jim Bohannon, Larry Elder and Red Eye Radio overnights. On weekends, WHOW carries CBS Sports Radio programming, along with a Saturday morning farm show, local Clinton High School football and basketball games, and afternoon blocks of classic country music.

== History ==
=== Early years ===
This station began broadcast operations in August 1947 as a 1,000 watt daytime-only radio station broadcasting at 1520 kHz as WHOW. The station, licensed to serve the community of Clinton, Illinois, was owned by Dr. Keith Rhea, H.E. Rhea, Rex K. Rhea, Tom Dinsmore, and Frank Moots doing business as the Cornbelt Broadcasting Company.

=== Livesay era ===
WHOW licensee Cornbelt Broadcasting Company was acquired by James R. "Ray" Livesay in September 1950. The station was able to increase its daytime signal to 5,000 watts in 1962. On April 19, 1972, the station's studios were moved from the downtown square to an office building at its tower site, four miles (6 km) south of Clinton, built to resemble a "big red barn". (The station and its FM sister station still operate from this facility.) Inspired by the April 1987 opening of the Clinton Nuclear Generating Station, WHOW changed its motto to "WHOW, your radio active station" in 1989.

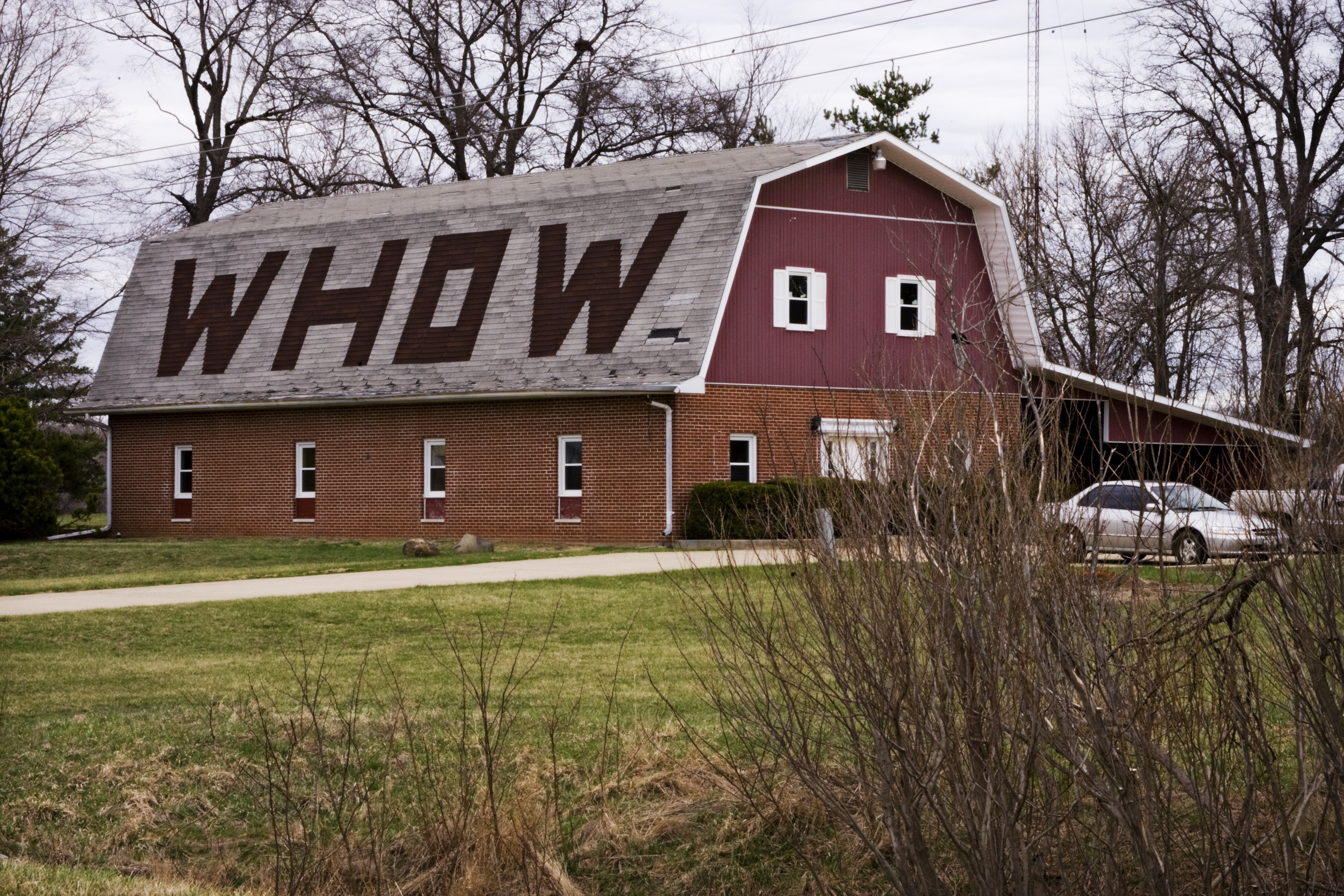
WHOW's Big Red Barn studios (2009)

Livesay founded the Daytime Broadcasters Association in 1955 and served as its president until 1982. The National Association of Broadcasters presented the National Radio Award to Livesay in 1989 citing his "lifelong contributions to the industry". Ray Livesay died in May 1995. Livesay's son, James R. "Jim" Livesay II, took over operation of WHOW and WHOW-FM after his death. Alonzon Newnum, the chief engineer for WHOW for more than four decades, died in late November 1999.

=== Gone silent ===
In June 2002, the Federal Communications Commission (FCC) issued a Notice of Apparent Liability for Forfeiture to Cornbelt Broadcasting for its failure to maintain an operational Emergency Alert System decoder, post an antenna structure registration number, and enclose its AM antenna structure within effective locked fences or other enclosures." Cornbelt Broadcasting did not file a response and on October 31, 2002, the FCC issued a forfeiture notice that ordered the WHOW and WHOW-FM licensee to pay a fine of $17,000 for "willfully and repeatedly violating" FCC regulations.

In response, WHOW and WHOW-FM went off the air on November 1, 2002, and notified the FCC that they had gone "silent" on November 5, 2002. At the time of the shutdown, the financially struggling stations had a combined 8 to 10 part-time employees and had maintained an "irregular broadcast schedule" in the months leading up to the shutdown. Within days, the station's office hours sign had the normal "8 a.m.-6 p.m." crossed out and "Permanently closed forever" written in its place.

In January 2003, however, the stations resumed at least intermittent broadcasting with WHOW concentrating on news, sports, and farm updates with the FM station changed to light rock music. Normal broadcast operation was restored in early November 2003 with personnel borrowed from other Cornbelt Broadcasting radio stations and recorded programming. The stations were being prepared for a sale, then in the negotiation stage, to a group led by real estate developer and Illinois state senator Bill Brady.

=== New ownership ===
After more than five decades of ownership by the Livesay family, Cornbelt Broadcasting Company (James R. Livesay II, president) reached an agreement in late November 2003 to transfer the broadcast license for this station to WHOW Radio, LLC (led by Bill Brady) along with FM sister station WHOW-FM for a reported combined sale price of $300,000. The deal was approved by the FCC on January 26, 2004, and the transaction was consummated on February 9, 2004.

At the time of the sale, both stations were "dark" for reported financial reasons. In September 2004, with both stations back on the air, WHOW adopted a news/talk format while shifting all sports programming to its FM sister station which itself switched to a 24-hour all-sports radio format. WHOW increased live, local programming and focused more on subject of specific local interest, especially farm and agricultural issues.

=== Tower collapse ===
An ice storm, part of the Early Winter 2006 North American Storm Complex, struck the Central Illinois region on November 30, 2006. On December 1, the broadcast tower shared by WHOW and its FM counterpart collapsed under the weight of the accumulated ice. WHOW was able to return to the air at reduced power a few days later using a long wire antenna while the FM station resumed broadcasting from a makeshift 60-foot (18 m) tower on December 8. The station received special temporary authority from the FCC in January 2007 to operate in this manner until a new, permanent tower could be constructed.

The extensive damage and the station combo's struggling finances led the WHOW Radio, LLC, partners to sell the two stations to local media group owner Randy Miller. In October 2007, WHOW Radio, LLC, announced an agreement to sell WHOW to Kaskaskia Broadcasting, Inc. (Randy Miller, president) as part of a two-station deal along with FM sister station WHOW-FM for a reported $400,000. Kaskaskia Broadcasting, Inc., is part of the Miller Media Group. The deal was approved by the FCC on December 7, 2007, and the transaction was consummated on January 4, 2008. At the time of the sale, WHOW broadcast a news/talk format.

WHOW, still broadcasting from a temporary antenna while the new tower was being erected, received an extension of its special temporary authorization on January 17, 2008. Both the AM and FM stations returned to full power operation on February 25, 2008.

WHOW today is one of Illinois' most prominent agriculture radio stations, broadcasting over 6 hours a day of ag programming weekdays and 1 1/2 hours on Saturdays. The station has its own local farm broadcaster, Jared White. WHOW also does a live and local morning show with three local interview shows a day, from 6 to 10 am. WHOW broadcasts Clinton High School sports, as well as Eastern Illinois University football.

WHOW is streamed on smartphones thru tunein.com.

== Former on-air staff ==
John Hartford, then known by his birth name of John Harford, worked at WHOW for from 1961 to 1963 before moving to Nashville to pursue a career in country music. Hartford would go on to write "Gentle on My Mind", a song made famous by Glen Campbell, and record more than 30 albums of newgrass and traditional bluegrass music.

Brian Leonard began his career at WHOW in 1979 and worked at the stations until 1980. He moved to California, where he co-hosted a live comedy/music show on KSTS-TV, San Jose, and then began a long stand-up comedy career, appearing on numerous TV shows. He was also a writer and performer on BBC Radio and appeared in several movies and TV shows.
