= 1520 AM =

AM radio frequency

The following radio stations broadcast on AM frequency 1520 kHz: 1520 AM is a United States clear-channel frequency. WWKB in Buffalo, New York, and KOKC in Oklahoma City share Class A status on 1520 AM.

== Argentina ==
- LRI721 in Chascomús, Buenos Aires
- LT38 in Gualeguay, Entre Rios
- La Voz del Sur in Luis Guillon, Buenos Aires
- Norteña in Los Polvorines, Buenos Aires

== Mexico ==
- XEEH-AM in San Luis Río Colorado, Sonora

== United States ==
Stations in bold are clear-channel stations.

Call sign	City of license	Facility ID	Class	Daytime power (kW)	Nighttime power (kW)	Critical hours power (kW)	Unlimited power (kW)	Transmitter coordinates
KFXZ	Lafayette, Louisiana	41054	B	10	0.5	10		30.280833°N 92.014722°W
KGDD	Oregon City, Oregon	2431	D	5	0.042			45.412222°N 122.576944°W
KKXA	Snohomish, Washington	160891	B	50	50			47.875556°N 122.077778°W
KMPG	Hollister, California	53658	D	5		3.5		36.835°N 121.418611°W
KMSR	Northwood, North Dakota	54336	D	1.5				47.499167°N 97.350833°W
**KOKC**	Oklahoma City, Oklahoma	73981	A	50	50			35.333333°N 97.504444°W
KQQB	Stockdale, Texas	67285	D	2.5				29.193056°N 97.866667°W
KRHW	Sikeston, Missouri	16550	B	5	1.6	5		36.823611°N 89.595833°W
KSIB	Creston, Iowa	22964	D	1				41.037778°N 94.393889°W
KVEN	Port Hueneme, California	25091	B	10	1			34.167222°N 119.133889°W
KYND	Cypress, Texas	40696	D	25		18		29.886944°N 96.014444°W
KZOY	Sioux Falls, South Dakota	48026	D	0.5				43.557778°N 96.796111°W
WARR	Warrenton, North Carolina	31897	D	5		1		36.405°N 78.135833°W
WCHE	West Chester, Pennsylvania	71279	D	1		0.8		39.966111°N 75.631944°W
WDCY	Douglasville, Georgia	73693	D	2.7		0.89		33.763333°N 84.741111°W
WDSL	Mocksville, North Carolina	71354	D	5		1		35.880556°N 80.540556°W
WEXY	Wilton Manors, Florida	9730	B	5	0.8			26.173889°N 80.1575°W
WHOW	Clinton, Illinois	13900	D	5		1		40.095278°N 88.964167°W
WINW	Canton, Ohio	8549	D	0.23	0.003	0.155		40.844722°N 81.350556°W
WIZZ	Greenfield, Massachusetts	54779	D	1	0.16			42.603333°N 72.605833°W
WJDM	Mineola, New York	68957	D	1		0.278		40.685°N 73.61°W (daytime); 40.685°N 73.607222°W (critical hours)
WKVI	Knox, Indiana	33325	D	1.8		0.35		41.321389°N 86.605833°W
WLUV	Loves Park, Illinois	2255	D	0.5	0.013			42.33°N 89.082778°W
WNDO	Apopka, Florida	1185	B	5	0.35			28.652222°N 81.494444°W
WNWS	Brownsville, Tennessee	66660	D	0.25				35.608333°N 89.244444°W
WPAY	Rossford, Ohio	40858	B	0.5	0.4			41.508889°N 83.551944°W
WQCT	Bryan, Ohio	72784	D	0.5	0.005	0.25		41.477778°N 84.578333°W
WRCI	Three Rivers, Michigan	70462	D	0.43	0.008			41.928611°N 85.6375°W
WRSJ	San Juan, Puerto Rico	54958	B	25	25			18.353056°N 66.2025°W
WSVX	Shelbyville, Indiana	2872	D	0.26	0.004			39.558056°N 85.770278°W
WTLM	Opelika, Alabama	22876	D	1		0.65		32.657222°N 85.424167°W
**WWKB**	Buffalo, New York	34383	A				50	42.769444°N 78.842778°W
WXYB	Indian Rocks Beach, Florida	2918	D	1	0.013			27.844167°N 82.7725°W
WZBU	New Holstein, Wisconsin	6649	D	0.35				44.073889°N 88.179722°W
