= WLUV =

- Loves Park, Illinois; United States
- Broadcast area: Rockford metropolitan area, Illinois
- Frequency: 1520 kHz

Programming
- Format: Conservative Christian radio
- Affiliations: VCY America

Ownership
- Owner: VCY America; (VCY America, Inc.)

History
- First air date: September 29, 1962
- Call sign meaning: Its city of license of Loves Park

Technical information
- Licensing authority: FCC
- Facility ID: 2255
- Class: D
- Power: 500 watts day 12 watts night
- Transmitter coordinates: 42°19′48″N 89°4′58″W
- Translator: 105.3 W287BY (Rockford)

Links
- Public license information: Public file; LMS
- Webcast: Listen Live
- Website: vcyamerica.org

WLUV (1520 AM) is a radio station licensed to Loves Park, Illinois, United States, the station serves the Rockford area with a non-directional signal. The station airs a Conservative Christian format, and is an owned and operated affiliate of VCY America.

1520 AM is a United States clear-channel frequency, on which WWKB in Buffalo, New York, and KOKC in Oklahoma City, Oklahoma, both share Class A status. WLUV must drastically reduce nighttime power in order to protect the nighttime skywave signals of the Class A stations.

== History ==
The station began broadcasting on September 29, 1962. Originally a daytime-only license, WLUV now operates with reduced power at night. The station originally aired a country music format, and was the first country station in the Rockford market. The station was owned by Joe Salvi.

A sister station (broadcast from a different transmission tower), WLUV-FM began broadcasting March 25, 1964, and operated at 96.7 MHz. For many years, it simulcast much of WLUV's programming. It was sold and now holds the call sign WKGL-FM and is under the ownership of Townsquare Media. The sale to Townsquare was completed on November 14, 2013.

In August 2021, Christian broadcaster VCY America entered into an agreement to purchase WLUV and translator W287BY for $400,000, and applied to the FCC to convert the stations to non-commercial status. The sale was consummated on November 30, 2021.

== Translator ==
In addition to the main AM station, WLUV is relayed by an FM translator to provide stereo with improved sound and wider nighttime coverage.

Call sign	Frequency	City of license	FID	ERP (W)	HAAT	Class	FCC info
W287BY	105.3 FM	Rockford, Illinois	151837	135	90 m (295 ft)	D	LMS
