= KQQB =

- Stockdale, Texas; United States
- Broadcast area: Southeastern San Antonio Metro
- Frequency: 1520 kHz
- Branding: 1520 AM The Cube

Programming
- Format: Brokered Programming

Ownership
- Owner: Centro de Adoración Internacional Co.

History
- First air date: September 5, 1979
- Former call signs: KRJH (1979–1995); KHLT (1995–2011)

Technical information
- Licensing authority: FCC
- Facility ID: 67285
- Class: D
- Power: 2,500 watts (days only)
- Transmitter coordinates: 29°11′35.0″N 97°52′0.0″W

Links
- Public license information: Public file; LMS

KQQB is a broadcast radio station airing Brokered Programming. The station is licensed to Stockdale, Texas and serves Stockdale and the southeastern portion of the San Antonio metro area in Texas. KQQB is owned and operated by Centro De Adoracion Internacional Co.

== History ==
KQQB was originally licensed to Hallettsville, Texas at the time of its launch in 1979. A construction permit has been applied for to expand the station's daytime-only power from 2,500 watts to 20,000 watts. This allows it to be heard across the entire San Antonio Metro area and Victoria, Texas as well.

1520 AM is a United States clear-channel frequency.
