= XEEH-AM =

Radio station in San Luis Río Colorado, Sonora

- San Luis Río Colorado, Sonora; Mexico
- Frequency: 1520 AM
- Branding: La Primera

Programming
- Format: Variety

Ownership
- Owner: Sucesión de Francisco Encinas Ángulo

History
- First air date: June 26, 1973

Technical information
- Licensing authority: CRT
- Class: C
- Power: 1,000 watts day
- Transmitter coordinates: 32°28′59.6″N 114°47′12.6″W

Links
- Webcast: Listen live
- Website: XEEH-AM Facebook

XEEH-AM is a radio station on 1520 AM in San Luis Río Colorado, Sonora, Mexico, known as "La Primera".

== History ==
XEEH received its concession on June 26, 1973. It was owned by Francisco Encinas Ángulo and authorized as a 1,000-watt daytimer. XEEH was operated by Radio Grupo OIR and known as Radio Éxitos until 2013, when it became the city's only independent commercial radio station.
