= 2006 Colorado Holiday Blizzards =

Weather event in Colorado, United States

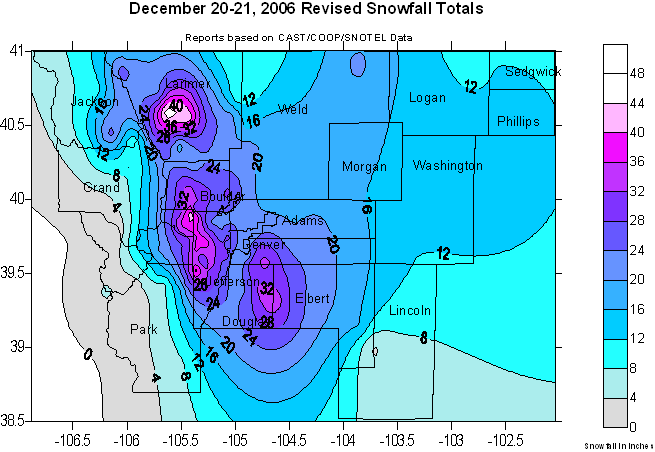

The Holiday Blizzards were major storms occurring in two segments during the last two weeks of December 2006 in the Denver, Colorado area. The blizzards occurred within a week of each other. A subsequent storm, narrower in scope, struck the area less than a week after the second blizzard, further hampering removal efforts and travel in the region. The blizzard covered homes.

== Colorado Holiday Blizzard I ==
The Holiday Blizzard I was an intense blizzard that covered the Colorado Front Range, the Colorado Eastern Plains and surrounding states. It began on December 20, 2006 with a powerful blizzard which crippled the region, forcing the closures of Interstate Highways 25, 76 and 70, as well as U.S. Routes 36 and 85. The city of Denver was shut down, the US Mail was undeliverable, and a statewide disaster was declared. Many grocery stores, department retailers and other service providing institutions were shut down or severely limited in the diversity of their supplies

=== Snowfall ===
It was estimated that drifts in some areas of Denver reached up to 5 feet (1.5 m), with an average depth of about 3 feet (0.91 m). By most estimates, it was the 4th largest storm in state recorded history, (though some readings place it at 6th), and the largest state blizzard since March 2003.

Notable amounts include:

- Boulder, Colorado – 32 inches
- Longmont, Colorado – 20 inches
- Estes Park, Colorado – 17 inches
- Fort Collins, Colorado – 21 inches
- Golden, Colorado –17 inches in about 10 hours
- Littleton, Colorado – 22 inches
- Monument, Colorado – 27 inches

== Colorado Holiday Blizzard II ==
The Holiday Blizzard II was another intense snow storm. The storm killed 100 people. This storm was arguably more intense than the first, but hit a much less populated region. The storm struck Colorado on December 28 and December 29. Coming so soon after the first blizzard and forecast to be another major storm, the approach of this storm prompted runs on grocery stores, hardware stores (for snow shovels, snow blowers and generators, among other items) as residents prepared to be snowed in for a second time. Due to the previous heavy snowfalls and lack of snow removal on many residential streets (still nearly impassable from the first storm) were unmanageable.

=== Snowfall ===
The second blizzard to hit Colorado followed a nearly identical path, with nearly identical conditions. However, this storm slipped south and hit the Southeastern Colorado Plains, Kansas and the Oklahoma and Texas Panhandles with severe wind and snow conditions. The snowfall totals from this storm were in addition to the snow that had fallen just a week previously.

- Castle Rock, Colorado – 7.5 inches
- Boulder, Colorado – 24 inches
- Evergreen, Colorado – 20.5 inches
- Littleton, Colorado – 10.5 inches
- Golden, Colorado – 17 inches in 10 hours
- Monument, Colorado – 14 inches

== Impact ==
=== Effects on travel ===
This blizzard closed the Denver International Airport (DEN) at 2:45PM MST on the same day, stranding upwards of 40,000 at the airport. Due to DIA's remote location, many people were forced to spend the night inside the airport, sleeping on cots or the floor. As Denver is a major hub for United Airlines, an estimated 100,000 people were affected by the closure. The airport reopened 22 December at 12:00PM MST having been closed for a record 45 hours.

Greyhound buses canceled all routes into, out of, and through Denver due to the storm.

A National Basketball Association game between the Denver Nuggets and Phoenix Suns was postponed due to the blizzard.

=== Deaths ===
The blizzard caused four confirmed deaths in Colorado, including one former CSU professor and a University of Colorado undergraduate student. Over two dozen deaths were reported in the Colorado, Kansas and the Oklahoma and Texas Panhandles as a result of these storms. Along the plains, between 10,000 and 15,000 cows were found dead due to the cold and severe weather conditions.

== Regional effects ==
Holiday Blizzard I was focused mainly on the Colorado Front Range, resulting in far smaller snow totals for the mountain ski resorts.

Holiday Blizzard II hit the Colorado Front Range almost as hard as the first storm, however, this storm moved south and east, burying the Southeastern Colorado Plains with 3' of snow, with snowdrifts topping 10' in some places.

=== Denver ===
The first blizzard began early on Wednesday December 20, 2006, as a storm blew through the eastern plains of Colorado spilling as much as two feet of snow up and down Interstate-25, from Fort Collins to Pueblo. The entire state was mired in drifts of snow up to 8 feet (2.4 m) high and, at some locations, even higher drifts existed. Downtown Denver, in particular, experienced severe economic hardships as a result since so many paths were not clear for potential customers, but it was the same throughout many places. Denver International Airport, the tenth busiest airport in the world and one of the busiest places in Colorado, rarely closes for weather, but was forced to shut down operations for a record 45 hours. Doing so in the midst of Christmas traveling, the closing affected travel across the United States. Hundreds of flights were canceled, and many upset travelers were stranded in the DIA terminals, and even though the plows were used to maximize clearing the runways, thousands of travelers were forced to extend their stay at DIA. Many roads throughout the state were impassable, schools and other community functions were canceled immediately, and the general public of Colorado was snowed in.

=== Albuquerque ===
The storm also pounded Albuquerque, New Mexico with over 26 inches of snow in less than two days.

== Relief efforts ==
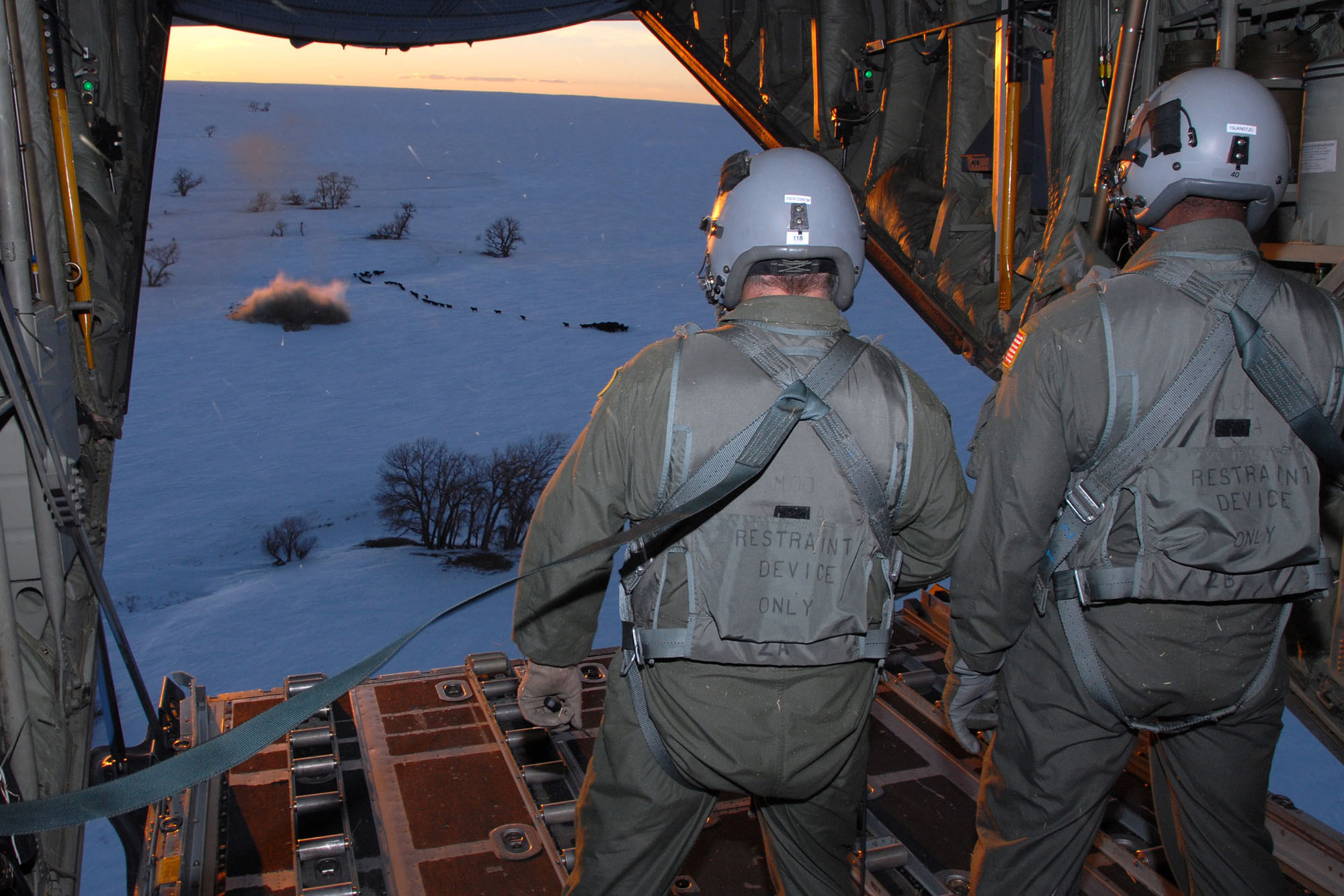
Wyoming Air National Guard loadmasters aboard a C-130 Hercules aircraft watch as a 1-ton hay bale lands near a herd of cows during an emergency feeding mission in southeast Colorado Jan. 3.

After Holiday Blizzard II the Colorado National Guard was sent to the Southeastern Colorado Plains in an attempt to access small towns isolated by heavy snowdrifts. Hay drops were instituted to feed thousands of stranded, starving cattle. Guardsmen in small helicopters were sent to break ice on water tanks for the cattle to drink.

On January 5, 2007, Senator Wayne Allard (R-Colo) and Congresswoman Marilyn Musgrave (R-Colo) introduced legislation that would give aid to the state, counties, cities, as well as residents and livestock owners who suffered blizzard-related losses in Colorado, Nebraska, Kansas, New Mexico and Oklahoma. The bill would declare the heaviest hit regions as "major disaster areas" and provide those hardest hit with FEMA and other federal aid.

== After the storms ==
The Holiday Blizzards were followed by an additional storm bearing more than a foot of snow on January 4–5, bringing the snowfall total for 16 days to more than 80 inches (2.0 m) in some areas. Denver itself received over 30 inches (0.76 m) of snow and over 55 inches (1.4 m) total for the season.

On January 4, 2007, United Airlines announced more than $40 million in losses from the storms' effects on holiday travel.

Concerns about potential cattle losses prompted Colorado to airlift hay to the hardest hit areas, including the use of UH-60 Blackhawk helicopters from the Colorado National Guard and a C-130 from the Wyoming National Guard. Losses in a similar storm in 1997 resulted in over 27,000 cattle fatalities with an economic loss of $27 million. Final losses were estimated between 10,000 and 15,000 cattle in Colorado. Overall, National Guard units, including ones from Wyoming and Oklahoma, dropped feed to an estimated 345,000 cattle stranded by ten foot drifts.

Following the storms, Denver and its surrounding cities struggled to move tons of snow. The cost for snow removal in December 2006 alone was $2.8 million and for the period January to March 2007 the cost was $10.2 million. Many of the side streets in Denver remained covered in snow which turned to thick ice due to continued residential traffic. According to the Denver Department of Public Works, snow and ice removal efforts continued until March 26, 2007. Overall, Denver experienced the second longest period of consecutive days of snow cover, from December 21, 2006 through February 19, 2007. Once the snow melted, the city was faced with filling over 50,000 potholes that resulted from the extreme temperatures and moisture.

== See also ==
- Global storm activity of 2006
- Global storm activity of 2007
- North American blizzard of 2006
