= WARR (AM) =

Radio station in Warrenton, North Carolina

- Warrenton, North Carolina; United States
- Frequency: 1520 kHz

Programming
- Format: African American Variety

Ownership
- Owner: Logan Darensburg d/b/a Darensburg Broadcasting

History
- Call sign meaning: WARRenton

Technical information
- Licensing authority: FCC
- Facility ID: 31897
- Class: D
- Power: 5,000 watts daytime 1,000 watts Critical Hours
- Transmitter coordinates: 36°24′18″N 78°8′0″W
- Translator: 102.9 W278DC (Warrenton)

Links
- Public license information: Public file; LMS
- Website: warr1520.com

WARR (1520 AM) is a radio station broadcasting an African American Variety format to the Warrenton, North Carolina, United States, area. The station is currently owned by Logan Darensburg d/b/a Darensburg Broadcasting.

WARR went on the air in 1970 in Warren County, North Carolina. Transmitter output was 1,000 watts at the time. The station was co-founded by Vernon Steed, owner of the Warren Theater. His partner was Jim Mayers, the owner of WSRC located in Durham, North Carolina, at the time. The transmitter power was later increased to 5,000 watts during the daytime, but remained at 1,000 watts during critical hours. WARR holds a daytime-only license.

In 1994, the station was sold to the Johnson Media Group. In 2002, WARR was acquired by Quad Divisions, Inc doing business as Darensburg Broadcasting, headed by Logan James Darensburg, II. Currently, Reverend Dr. Lilipiana D. Darensburg serves as General Manager and President of the station.

During 2011, WARR aired some North Carolina Central University sports events. In July 2024, the station became an affiliate of the syndicated Pink Floyd show "Floydian Slip."
