= Early Winter 2006 North American storm complex =

2006 Winter storm

The Early Winter 2006 North American storm complex was a severe winter storm that occurred on November 26, 2006, and continued into December 1. It affected much of North America in some form, producing various kinds of severe weather including a major ice storm, blizzard conditions, high winds, extreme cold, a serial derecho and some tornadoes.

== Impact ==
=== Overview ===
The massive and far-reaching storm was called the Superstorm of 2006 by some meteorologists.

As of December 4, at least 23 deaths had been attributed to the storm system.

The storm allowed frigid air bottled up in much of western Canada and Alaska to flow south and overspread the United States, with sub-zero (°F) highs in the northern Plains. The colder air later reached the eastern half of the United States with much lesser impact.

=== Pacific Northwest ===
The first impacts took place in the Pacific Northwest on November 26. It was unusual in that the snow fell all the way to the coast, which is rare so early in the season. Up to 2 feet (61 cm) of snow fell in the Cascades, with up to 6 inches (15 cm) in the Puget Sound area. The Sierra Nevada saw up to a foot and many valley locations recorded 4–10 inches (10–25 centimetres).

In the Greater Vancouver Area and Vancouver Island, British Columbia, 6–20 inches (15–51 centimetres) of snow fell on November 26 and 27, with Abbotsford recording the heaviest amount at about 45 cm (about 1.5 feet). At least 1 person was killed by the snowfall in British Columbia. The Vancouver and Victoria areas normally get far more rain than snow, even during the winter months, due to the warm flow coming from the Pacific Ocean.

Before the occurrence of the snowstorm however, it was all about the rain. The city of Vancouver was under a boil water advisory due to two of the main reservoirs overflowing. The snowstorm occurred because of another huge low-pressure system, but this time, colliding with an Arctic ridge resulted in extremely heavy snow and causing overnight temperatures to dip to well below seasonal values; −12 °C (10 °F) on the 28th and −11.6 °C (11.1 °F) on the 29th. Daily high temperatures hovered at a frigid −5 °C (23 °F) on the 28th as the Arctic ridge began to stabilize over the south coast. Drier air began to influence the coast with sunny breaks and isolated flurries beginning on the evening of the 27th and ending on the morning of the 29th. On the 30th, about 25 cm (8-10 inches) of snow was recorded to be on the ground at Vancouver International Airport. In some areas of the lower mainlands hills/higher elevations such as West Vancouver, North Vancouver, Coquitlam, Burnaby Mountain and Maple Ridge the snow started earlier (some snow recorded as early as the 24th) and ended later (some snow recorded as late as 4 December) so the snow lasted much longer than the rest of the lower mainland as temperatures got very close to −18 °C (0 °F).

=== Rocky Mountains ===
The storm then moved into the central Rocky Mountains and the northern Plains from November 27 to 29. The central and northern Rockies received 1–2 feet (30–61 cm), with up to 3 feet (91 cm) in the Wasatch Range and a foot of snow falling along the Wasatch Front of Utah through the 29th.

=== Northern Plains ===
As the system moved eastward, it remained a snow event across the northern Plains, with the heaviest snow taking place in Canada on November 27 and 28, Heavy snow fell across portions of Saskatchewan, Manitoba and northwestern Ontario including the cities of Saskatoon, Regina and Winnipeg. Accumulations of 4–10 inches (10–25 centimetres) were common and blizzard conditions occurred across portions of Saskatchewan.

=== Midwest ===
Late on November 28, the system moved eastward into the Midwest, with the most significant impacts taking place on November 29 and 30. Up to a foot (30 cm) of snow with blizzard conditions and even some freezing rain at times fell across the Plains and Midwest as far south as Texas through the 30th, bringing the first significant snowfall of the season to some areas. Freezing rain and other winter weather also took place across parts of the southern Plains and the Tennessee Valley by the 30th, as well. Blizzard conditions were reported in Oklahoma, where Tulsa, Oklahoma picked up about 10 inches (25 cm) of snow, a record high snowfall so early in the season for that city.

The storm continued to press northeastward late in the day on November 30, producing heavy snow and ice across most of Kansas and Missouri. The Wichita area received blizzard conditions, while Butler, Missouri picked up 15 inches (38 cm) of snow. Freezing rain and sleet caused widespread power outages in the St. Louis region, causing over ½ million customers (almost entirely Ameren) to be without power in Missouri and Illinois, for the second time in 1 year (see 2006 St. Louis Derecho), some of them not gaining power for a week. On Sunday, December 3, over 300,000 customers were still without power through the weekend, prompting the Army National Guard to come in and provide aid. The storm also significantly impacted central Illinois, where Bloomington received 3 inches (76 mm) of ice, followed by 17.6 inches (45 cm) of snow. In Peoria, Illinois, heavy snow caused the roof of a nursing home to collapse, injuring four people.

The storm hit the Chicago area on the morning of December 1, its intensity peaking during the morning rush hour. Its expected impact caused over 450 flights to be canceled at O'Hare International Airport and 70 flights to be canceled at Midway International Airport. Additionally, hundreds of schools, colleges, and even workplaces, particularly in the collar counties, were closed for the day. 17 inches (43 cm) of snow fell in LaSalle and Peru, where blizzard conditions brought Interstate 80 to a standstill for much of the day. Chicago's northern and northwestern suburbs were particularly hard hit, where up to 15 inches (38 cm) of snow fell in McHenry and over a foot of snow fell over much of Lake County, Illinois, and northwestern Cook County. Snow fell at times at rates of over 1 to 2 inches (3 to 5 centimetres) throughout most of the Chicago area, and thundersnow was reported in several locations. Meanwhile, the city of Chicago only saw 6.2 inches (16 cm) of snow, thanks to warm air on the back side of the low which produced more of a slushy mixture and less snowfall. Blowing and drifting snow, in addition to below-freezing temperatures caused roads to continue to be hazardous for travel through the weekend. In southeast Wisconsin blizzard warnings were posted for much of the day on December 1 in Kenosha, Racine, and Milwaukee counties. Genoa City, just north of the WI-IL border, saw over 14 inches (36 cm) of snow, while Milwaukee received 10.1 inches (26 cm) of snow. The highest total in the region was Kenosha, receiving 17 inches (43 cm) of snow. This area of southeast Wisconsin had not experienced a blizzard like this since the Blizzard of 1999. The storm moved out over Lake Michigan and into the northern sections of lower Michigan midday December 1, and up to a foot of snow fell across the area. By late afternoon, the blizzard moved into Canada.

=== Central Canada ===
On December 1, the blizzard and ice storm moved into Ontario and Quebec. In eastern Canada, several areas received between 15 and 6–10 inches (15–25 centimetres), especially in northeastern Ontario and in central and eastern Quebec. However, many areas, including central New Brunswick, southern Ontario and southern Quebec, received mixed precipitation including ice pellets and freezing rain. Over a 250,000 Hydro-Québec residents in the Montreal area lost their power during their storm and tens of thousands of residents in Ontario were also without power due to damaging winds and heavy amounts of freezing rain. The ice accumulation locally reached two inches (51 mm) in eastern Ontario with Ottawa receiving over 1 inch (25 mm) while Montreal in southern Quebec received 1.25 inches (32 mm) of ice. The towns of Russell and Embrun in eastern Ontario were under a state of emergency due to the storm. This area was also hard-hit by the 1998 Ice Storm which caused over 1 million homes to lose power (some of them for up to one month) while transmission towers and hydro poles were destroyed.

=== Mid-Atlantic ===
South of the ice, severe thunderstorms took place across the Mid-Atlantic States on December 1 as the snow and ice took place farther north, where warm Gulf moisture created a situation ripe for heavy rain and severe thunderstorms.

On the morning of December 1, while heavy snow was battering the Midwest, large sections of the Northeastern United States saw temperatures in the 60–75 °F (16–24 °C) range. Including a record high for December 1 of 70 °F in Pittsburgh. Severe thunderstorms were forecast for Ohio, Pennsylvania, and parts of the Northeast megalopolis. Sure enough, heavy rain, strong winds, hail, and vivid lightning pelted the area, in addition to several tornadoes. One of the strongest tornadoes, an F2, struck Luzerne County, Pennsylvania, southwest of Scranton. An F1 tornado struck Greensburg, Pennsylvania at 11:40 am, east of Pittsburgh.

Across Upstate New York, damaging thunderstorms resulted from an unprecedented temperature gradient and unusually strong jet stream winds over the area. Jet stream winds of 160 mph, and winds at the 1,000-foot level of as high as 70 mph crossed the area during the evening as an area of low pressure developed over the region and dragged a warm front northward. The Storm Prediction Center placed New York and Pennsylvania under a moderate risk for severe thunderstorms. Temperature contrasts were extreme along the warm front, with one area of Columbia County experiencing temperatures in the upper 30s. Two miles away, temperatures were in the upper 60s.

Severe thunderstorms developed across the cold front in Central New York and moved east. The 5 pm observation at Albany ahead of these storms was a temperature of 42 degrees and a dewpoint of 40. Immediately ahead of these storms, temperatures skyrocketed into the 60s. There were multiple reports of windows of homes and cars fogging up from the rapid rise in temperature.

Frequent lightning and damaging winds accompanied these storms which is unusual for the cold season in the Northeast. Large Hail, which is unheard of in the cold season was reported from these storms in Delaware and Columbia Counties. Trees and wires were reported downed in many areas, and in some cases Structural damage was reported. In Western Massachusetts, Tanglewood was especially hard hit. A microburst as high as 85 mph downed as many as 300 trees and caused $250,000 worth of damage. Severe damage was also reported in the vicinity.

=== Southern U.S. ===
Additionally, large sections of the southeast saw severe thunderstorms, including a bow echo that hit parts of Mississippi, Alabama, and Georgia on November 30. Several tornadoes were also reported.

== See also ==
- Weather of 2006
- North American blizzard of 2006
- Hanukkah Eve windstorm of 2006
- 1993 Storm of the Century
