= WNWS (AM) =

- Brownsville, Tennessee; United States
- Frequency: 1520 kHz
- Branding: The Cat

Programming
- Format: Soft adult contemporary

Ownership
- Owner: The Wireless Group Inc.

History
- First air date: October 14, 1963; 62 years ago
- Former call signs: WBHT (1963–1991)
- Call sign meaning: News

Technical information
- Licensing authority: FCC
- Facility ID: 66660
- Class: D
- Power: 250 watts day only
- Transmitter coordinates: 35°36′30.00″N 89°14′40.00″W

Links
- Public license information: Public file; LMS

WNWS (1520 AM) is a radio station broadcasting a soft adult contemporary format. Licensed to Brownsville, Tennessee, United States, the station is owned by the Wireless Group Inc.
