= North American blizzard of 2006 =

Winter storm in North America in 2006

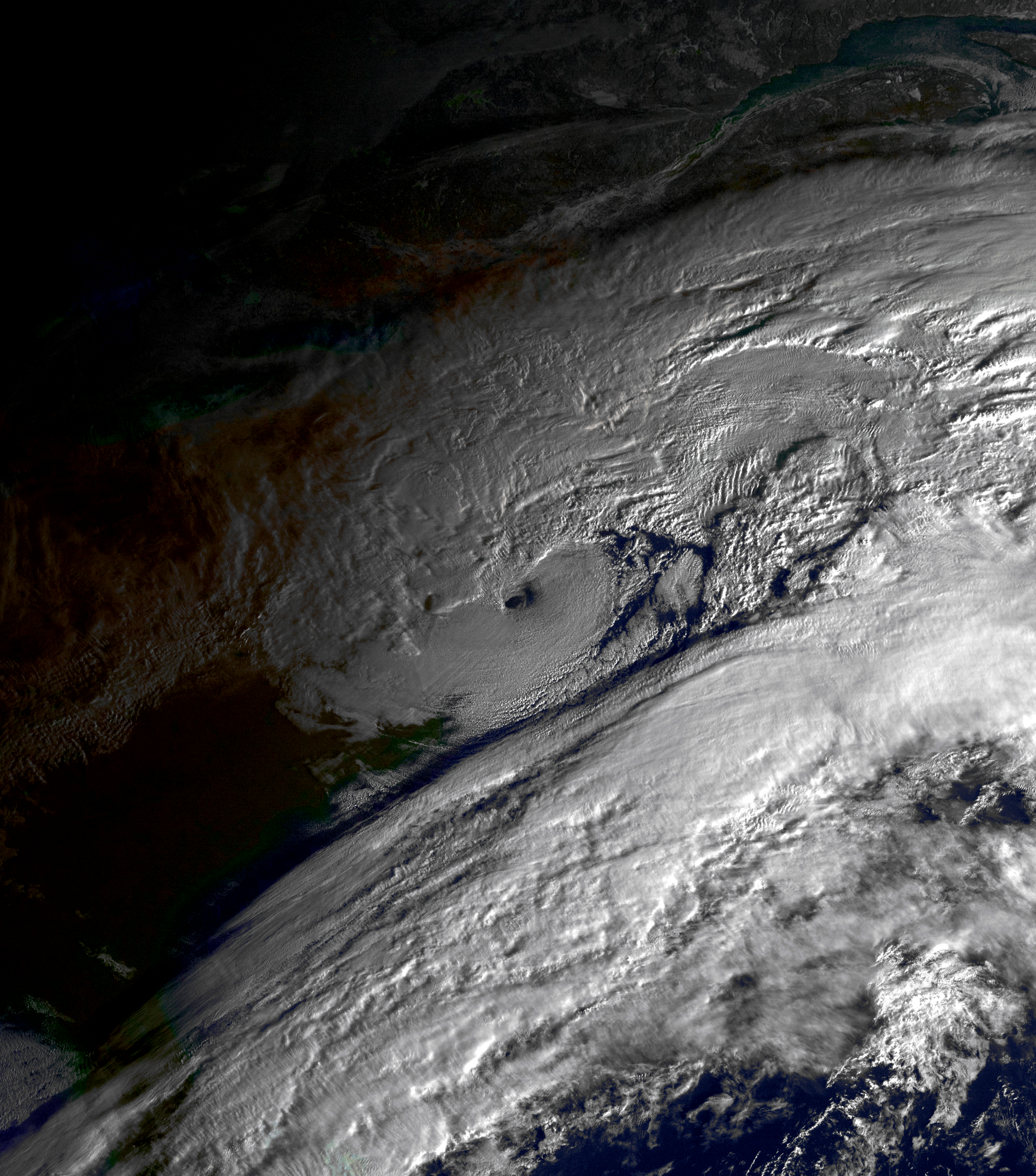
- NASA satellite image of the storm at its initial peak intensity on February 12, featuring a hurricane-like "eye".

Meteorological history
- Formed: February 09, 2006
- Dissipated: February 15, 2006

Category 2 "Minor" blizzard
- Regional snowfall index: 5.13 (NOAA)
- Lowest pressure: 959 mbar (hPa); 28.32 inHg
- Max. snowfall: 27.8 inches (71 cm) in Fairfield, Connecticut

Overall effects
- Fatalities: 3 indirect
- Damage: $5 million (2006 USD)
- Areas affected: Virginia, Maryland, District of Columbia, Pennsylvania, New York, New Jersey, Delaware, New England, Atlantic Canada
- Power outages: 506,000
- Part of the 2005–06 North American winter storms

The North American blizzard of 2006 was a nor'easter that began on the evening of February 11, 2006 and impacted much of eastern North America. It dumped heavy snow across the Mid-Atlantic and New England states, from Virginia to Maine through the early evening of February 12, and ended in Atlantic Canada on February 13. The major cities from Baltimore to Boston received at least a foot of snow, with a second-highest amount of 26.9 inches (68 cm) in New York City, the most (at the time) since at least 1869, the start of record keeping, only broken by the January 2016 United States blizzard nearly 10 years later.

== Meteorological synopsis ==
Map plotting the storm's track and intensity, according to the Saffir–Simpson scale Map key Saffir–Simpson scale Tropical depression (≤38 mph, ≤62 km/h) Tropical storm (39–73 mph, 63–118 km/h) Category 1 (74–95 mph, 119–153 km/h) Category 2 (96–110 mph, 154–177 km/h) Category 3 (111–129 mph, 178–208 km/h) Category 4 (130–156 mph, 209–251 km/h) Category 5 (≥157 mph, ≥252 km/h) Unknown Storm type Tropical cyclone Subtropical cyclone Extratropical cyclone, remnant low, tropical disturbance, or monsoon depression

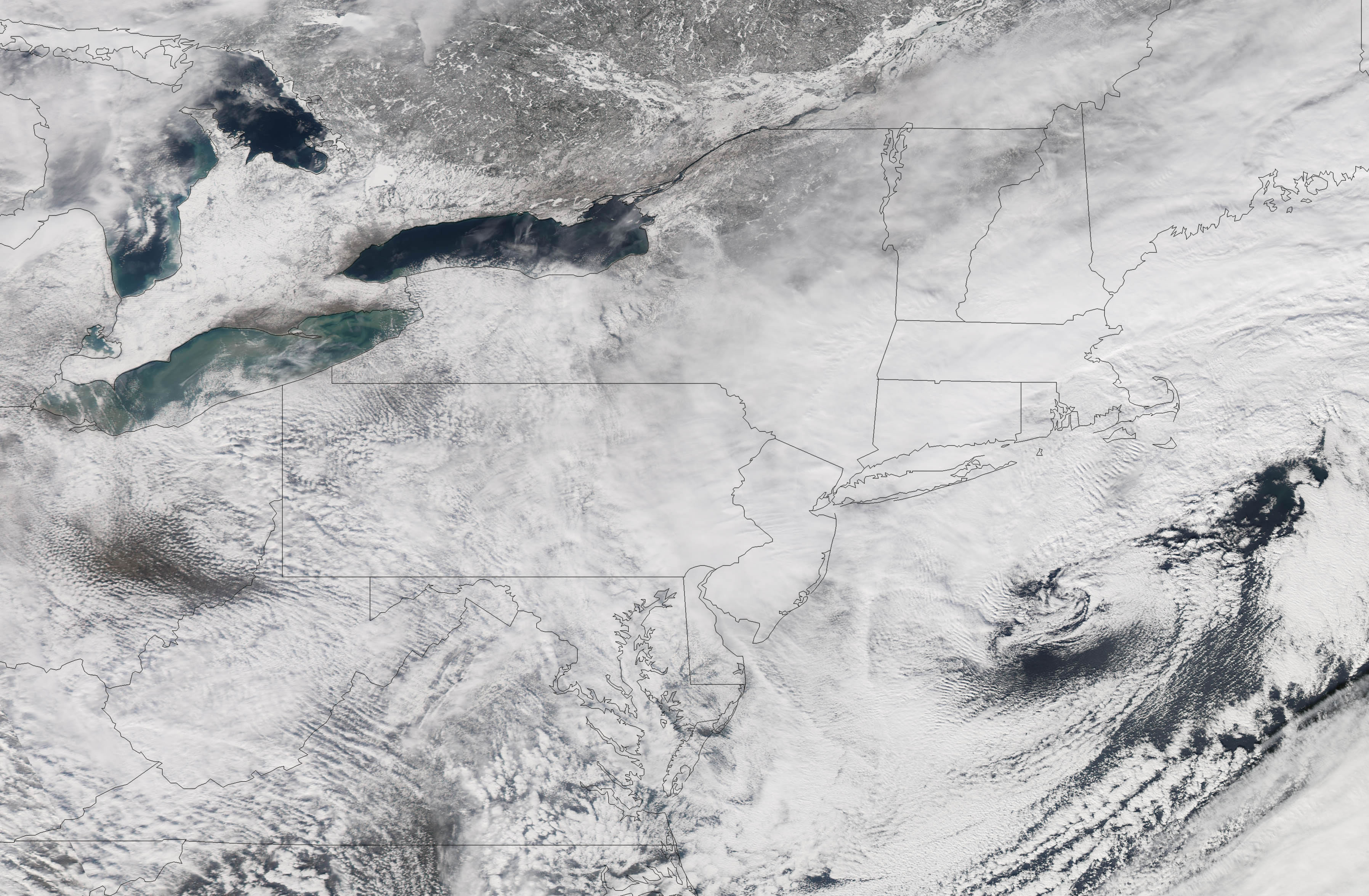
A NASA satellite image of the storm

Since the heaviest snow was confined to a fairly small, but very heavily populated area, the storm was only ranked as a low-end Category 3 (Major) on the new Northeast Snowfall Impact Scale, which takes into account the area and population affected, as well as snowfall accumulations. This indirectly also reflects the fact that casualties were extremely low and cleanup was fairly quick, even in the New York City area where the record snow amounts occurred. The main reasons for this are: A) The storm fell on a Sunday when many people can more easily stay home, B) the relatively small geographic area of extremely large snowfall, and C) Because the temperature was well below freezing throughout most of the storm, the snow was mostly dry and light in composition, as opposed to the wet and heavy snows that make some otherwise lesser storms much harder to clean up from and are more common at least in the coastal Northeast. Additionally, temperatures in the days after the storm were unseasonably warm in some spots (reaching the mid-50s °F in hard-hit New York City, and the mid 60s in DC) which helped melt the snow much more quickly than usual.

The storm system originated over the Great Plains on February 9, moving eastward into the Southeastern United States two days later as a minor system, bringing some snow along the southern Appalachian range. The low pressure center moved offshore early on February 12, before it began its rapid intensification. By early morning, snow began falling heavily, taking several forecasters by surprise who had expected about a foot of snow, at most, along the eastern fringes of the Atlantic seaboard. During the height of the storm on Sunday morning, on February 12th, thunder and lightning occurred as the snow fell.

The extreme intensification was partially the result of a fairly mild winter that kept water temperatures in the Atlantic a few degrees warmer than they normally are in February. The storm system's intensity led to snowfall accumulations upwards of 32 inches (81 cm) in some localities.

In addition to the heavy snow, coastal flooding from storm surge was reported, particularly in Massachusetts. Storm surges have been recorded as high as 3 feet (0.91 m) in parts of New England.

The low-pressure area began developing over the Southern states a few days prior to the Blizzard striking, eventually merging with a northern jet stream system. A trough on the East Coast brought the system up the coast, and cold high pressure to the north eventually slowed the system to a crawl. As the system completed bombing, or rapid decrease in central pressure (a common measure of the strength of a storm), mesoscale banding features (areas of significant snowfall associated with smaller scale physical phenomena) impinged on the entire I-95 Corridor.

The low pressure center was so deep that somewhat of an eye actually formed. Rarely do eyes form on storms other than hurricanes, and it is especially rare in extratropical cyclones. NASA took a satellite picture of the eye of the storm; the eye was located south and east of southern New Jersey in this picture.

== Impact ==
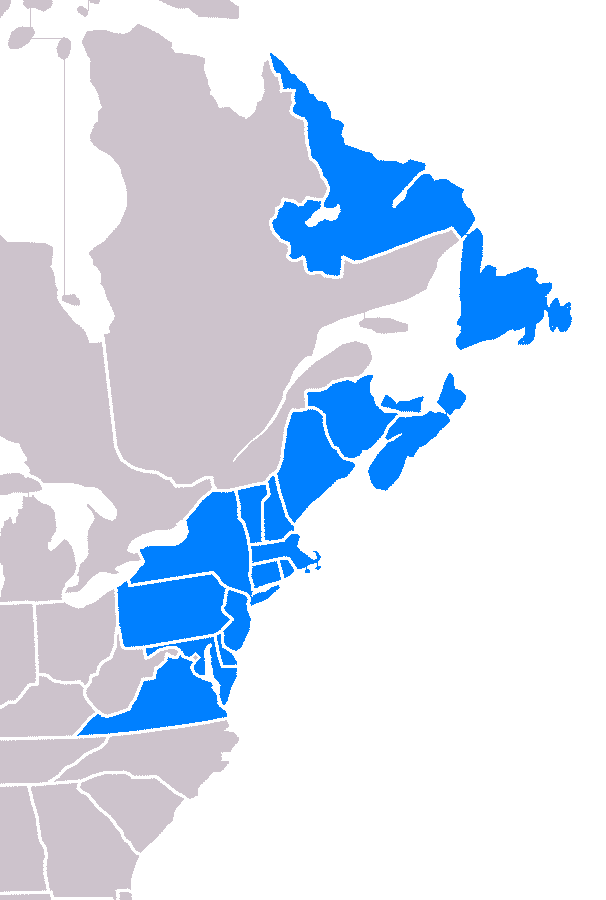
A map of the states and provinces impacted by the blizzard

A radar reflectivity loop of the blizzard in the New York metropolitan area

Three casualties occurred as a result of the snow: in Virginia, a man died due to his truck sliding off a highway; in Baltimore, a person died in a house fire as a result of snow delaying rescue workers from getting to the fire. A third fatality occurred in a weather-related accident in Nova Scotia.

=== Connecticut ===
While Connecticut was one of the hardest hit areas, the state was well-prepared for the storm and managed to avoid major problems. Hartford received a total of 21.9 inches (56 cm) of snow — the second largest snowfall since 1906. A total of 18 inches (46 cm) fell in the small Sandy Hook village. West Hartford totaled 27 inches (69 cm) and Fairfield saw 27.8 inches (71 cm) of snow. Despite the large amounts of snow, there were only isolated individual power outages. At the storm's onset, governor M. Jodi Rell ordered all tractor-trailer trucks off the state's highways to facilitate the efforts of highway crews with snow removal. Motorists whose vehicles were not equipped with 4-wheel drive were required to use snow chains to travel on state roadways during the storm. Connecticut mobilized 2,500 state-owned and privately contracted snowplows to keep state highways open during the storm. The state's 169 cities and towns employed hundreds of additional plows to keep local roads passable. Bradley International Airport was closed for several hours, and the storm disrupted service on Metro North.

=== Delaware ===
New Castle County and Wilmington felt the brunt of this storm, with 14 to 15 inches (36 to 38 centimetres) of snow. Kent and Sussex counties to the south mixed with rain for a while, and saw significantly less snow accumulations, mostly in the 6 inches (15 cm) range.

=== District of Columbia ===
Residents in Washington, D.C. missed the worst of the storm. The city received about 10 inches (25 cm) of snow, far less than in the suburbs. Approximately 3,000 people lost electricity in the District of Columbia. However, Ronald Reagan Washington National Airport (just across the Potomac River) was closed.

=== Maryland ===
The heaviest snow in Maryland fell from the northern suburbs of Washington, D.C., to the Baltimore area. These areas overwhelmingly saw over a foot of snow. Snowfall rates of 2 to 3 inches (5 to 8 centimetres) per hour were common, and thundersnow occurred. Snowfall amounts of up to 21 inches (53 cm) were reported in Columbia, 13.1 inches (33 cm) in Baltimore, 17 inches (43 cm) in Catonsville, and a foot (30.5 cm) in Potomac. This was the area's heaviest snow since the North American blizzard of 2003. Lesser amounts occurred in western and southern parts of the state.

Maryland was hardest hit by power outages. In the Baltimore area, more than 62,000 people lost electricity, plus another 16,000 in Montgomery County and 37,000 in Prince George's County.

=== Massachusetts ===
The most serious coastal problems were in Massachusetts. The heaviest snow was in the central part of the state, where snow amounts of up to 20 inches (51 cm) were reported. Coastal areas, particularly around Nantucket, saw lesser amounts (approximately 12") as it was mixed with sleet at times, but winds of up to 60 mph (97 km/h) whipped up the ocean with storm surges of 2 to 3 feet (61 to 91 cm) and led to some coastal flooding, plus offshore waves of up to 25 feet (7.6 m). Logan International Airport in Boston and Barnstable municipal airport in Hyannis on Cape Cod saw over 90% of their flights cancelled at the peak of the storm.

There were no power outages, despite the conditions. There was one death; a tree fell onto a pickup truck in Billerica, killing the driver. Strong winds across the state caused $1.9 million in damage (2006 USD).

=== New Jersey ===
The impact of the blizzard in North Jersey was strong enough to stop the New Jersey Transit bus service between 7:30 a.m. and 4:00 p.m., although trains continued to run (with some delays). Many roads remained closed. Businesses were closed for most of the day. 16,000 people were without power in the state. Central and northeastern New Jersey saw the brunt of the storm due to heavy banding through the night into the morning: 21 in (53 cm) of snow fell at Newark Airport and 27" fell in Rahway. The first Wicked Faire took place as scheduled.

=== New York ===
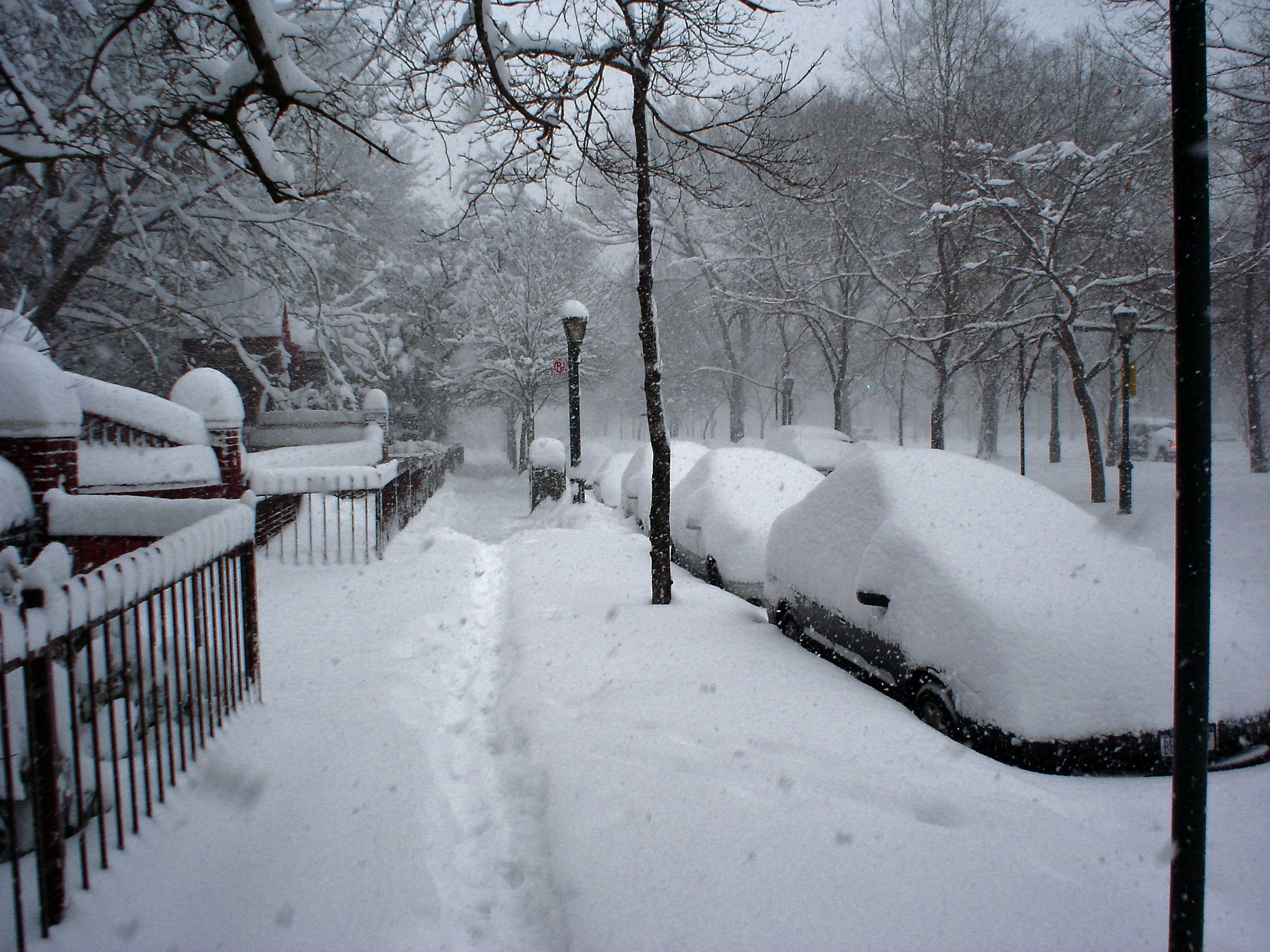
Prospect Heights, Brooklyn on February 12

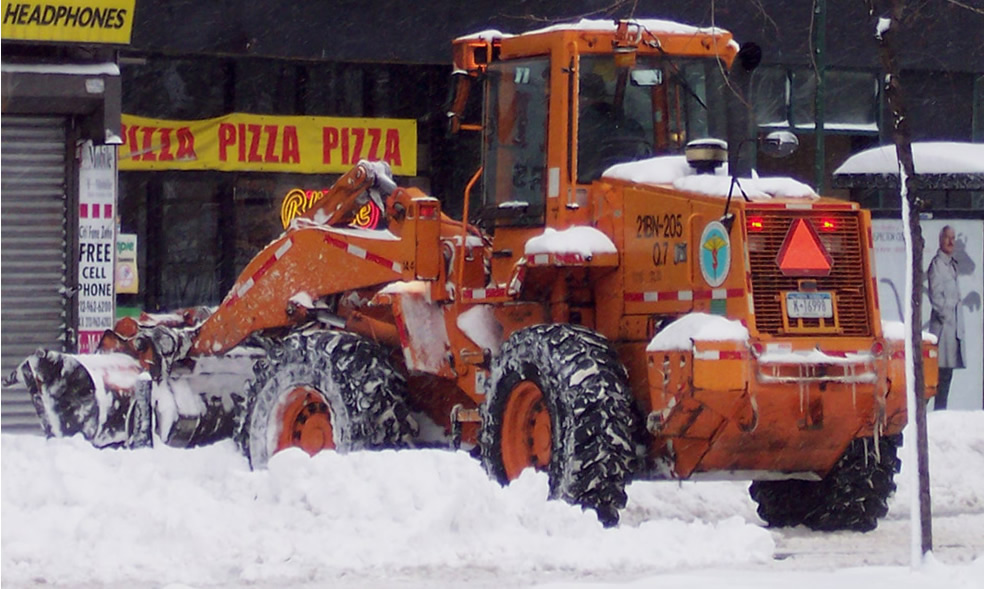
A loader clears snow in New York City during a lull in the snowfall on Sunday, February 12

The New York metropolitan area received the brunt of the February Blizzard of 2006. All three of the airports in the New York City area (LaGuardia Airport, John F. Kennedy International Airport and Newark Liberty International Airport) were closed during the record blizzard, for the first time since the September 11, 2001 attacks. Like the Blizzard of 1996, this winter storm does not meet the criteria to be called a blizzard, however. The winds were not strong enough, and visibility was not poor enough. Thundersnow, which is a rare occurrence in New York, occurred for about a 4-hour period in parts of The Bronx, Manhattan, Brooklyn, Queens, Rockland and Westchester during the height of the storm early Sunday morning.

Central Park received 26.9 inches (68 cm) of snow, the largest amount for a single storm since records began, breaking the record of 26.4 inches (67 cm) that fell on December 26, 1947. By comparison, the blizzards of 1996 and 2003 dropped 20.2 and 19.8 inches (51 and 50 cm) in Central Park respectively. The smallest amounts of snowfall were recorded in portions of Nassau County, including the towns of Oceanside, Lynbrook, Rockville Centre and Island Park. The snow removal cost in New York City alone is estimated at $27 million. It took nearly two days for utility crews to fully restore service to as many as 300,000 customers.

The storm did not reach very far north of the city; the Albany area only received 1–2 inches (3–5 centimetres) of snow. As a result, the 2005–06 winter season ended up being the first time ever since records began in the late 19th century that New York City received more snow than Albany in a given winter (the inland, upstate city averages about twice as much snowfall per winter as its big neighbor to the south).

The strong winds downed trees and powerlines, resulting in $3 million in damage (2006 USD). The Long Island Rail Road reported extensive delays and as many as eight trains disabled up to several hours after the blizzard. The Monday morning commute was no better, as two of the railroad's lines were shut down completely and delays caused headaches for ambitious commuters. By Tuesday, two days after the storm, service was back to normal.

Despite the record snowfall, New York City schools were open on February 13, owing to planning and work by the city and its snowplow team.

=== Pennsylvania ===
Snowfall totals were measured at 12 inches (30 cm) at Philadelphia International Airport, but 35 miles (56 km) to the west in West Caln Township there were 21 inches (53 cm). Philadelphia International Airport remained open throughout the storm, although about 50% of flights were cancelled. There were also power outages in the Philadelphia area, with about 10,000 customers losing power. In Western Pennsylvania, however, only 1 in (2.5 cm) or less of snow accumulated. Philadelphia public and parchocial schools were closed for the day.

=== Rhode Island ===
The Governor of Rhode Island, Donald Carcieri, declared a statewide state of emergency due to the blizzard conditions. The Providence Journal reported that state accumulations were generally between 9 and 19 inches (23 and 48 centimetres). Generally, Providence County received the heaviest accumulations in the state (see the chart below). On February 12, the bulk of the snow ended around 5:00 p.m. Eastern Standard Time, with flurries lasting through the early evening. No significant power outages or injuries were reported.

=== Virginia ===
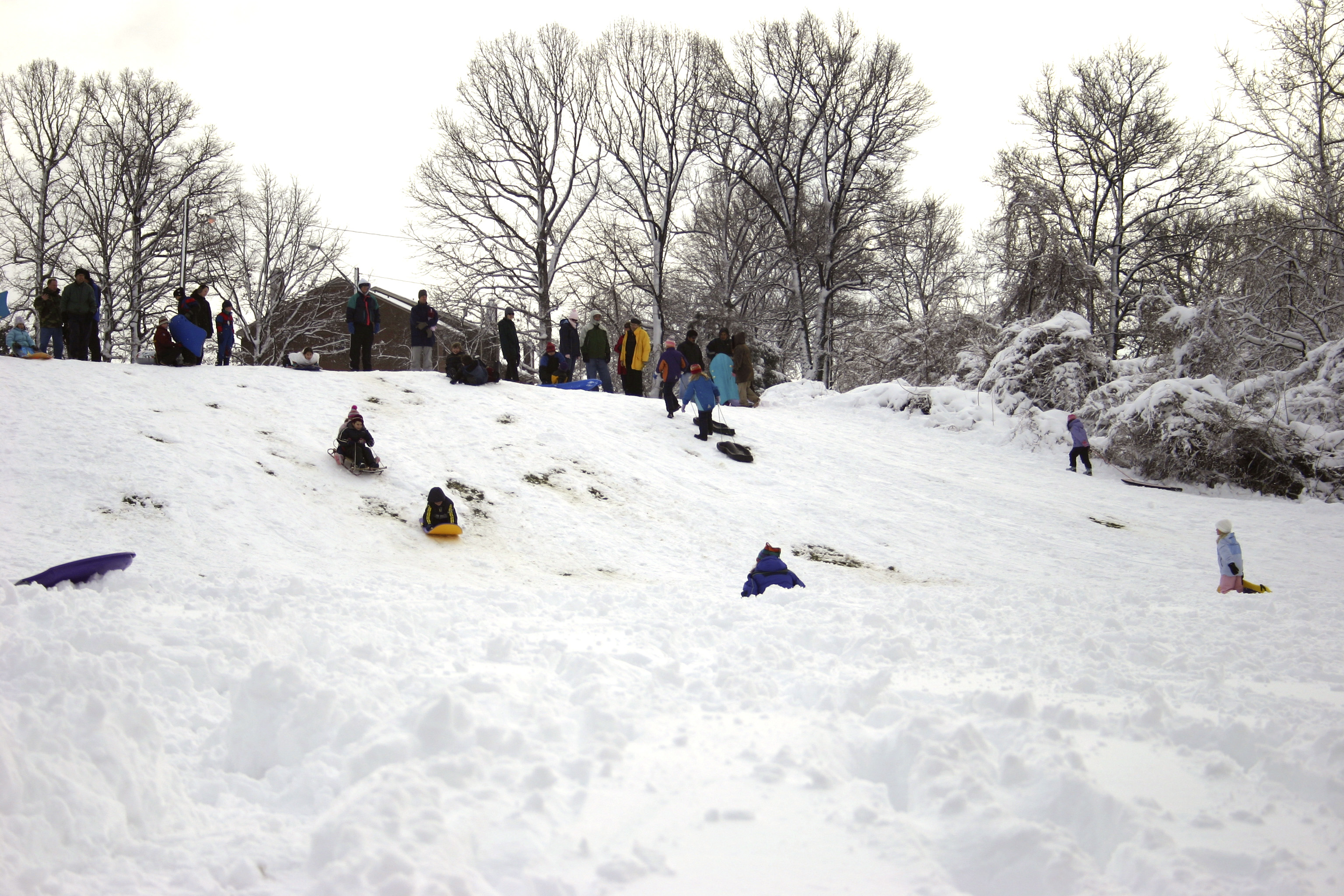
Falls Church, Virginia outside of Washington, D.C. in Northern Virginia during the storm

According to Dominion Power, over 64,000 people in Northern Virginia lost power in the storm, primarily in the suburban areas adjacent to Washington, D.C. Many locations in the extreme northeastern portion of the state recorded 10–15 in (25–38 cm) of snow, with Falls Church and Fairfax coming in at 13.5 and 14.0 in (34 and 36 cm) respectively. Fairfax County and eastern Loudoun County were generally the start of the 12+" (30+ cm) accumulations, which spread north towards Massachusetts.

=== Atlantic Canada ===
While the snowfall amounts diminished somewhat (to about 6 to 12 inches (300 mm) or 15 to 30 cm) by the time the storm tracked east into Atlantic Canada, the winds increased substantially. The worst of the storm was felt along the Atlantic coast, particularly in a swath around the Bay of Fundy, the Northumberland Strait and the south coast of Newfoundland. Hurricane-force wind gusts were reported in several communities, peaking at 156 km/h (97 mph) in Grand Etang, Nova Scotia (equal to a Category 2 hurricane) and 133 km/h (83 mph) in Cape Race on the east coast of Newfoundland. Some damage was reported as a result of the strong winds, particularly downed power lines but also some roof damage to buildings.

== Observed accumulations ==
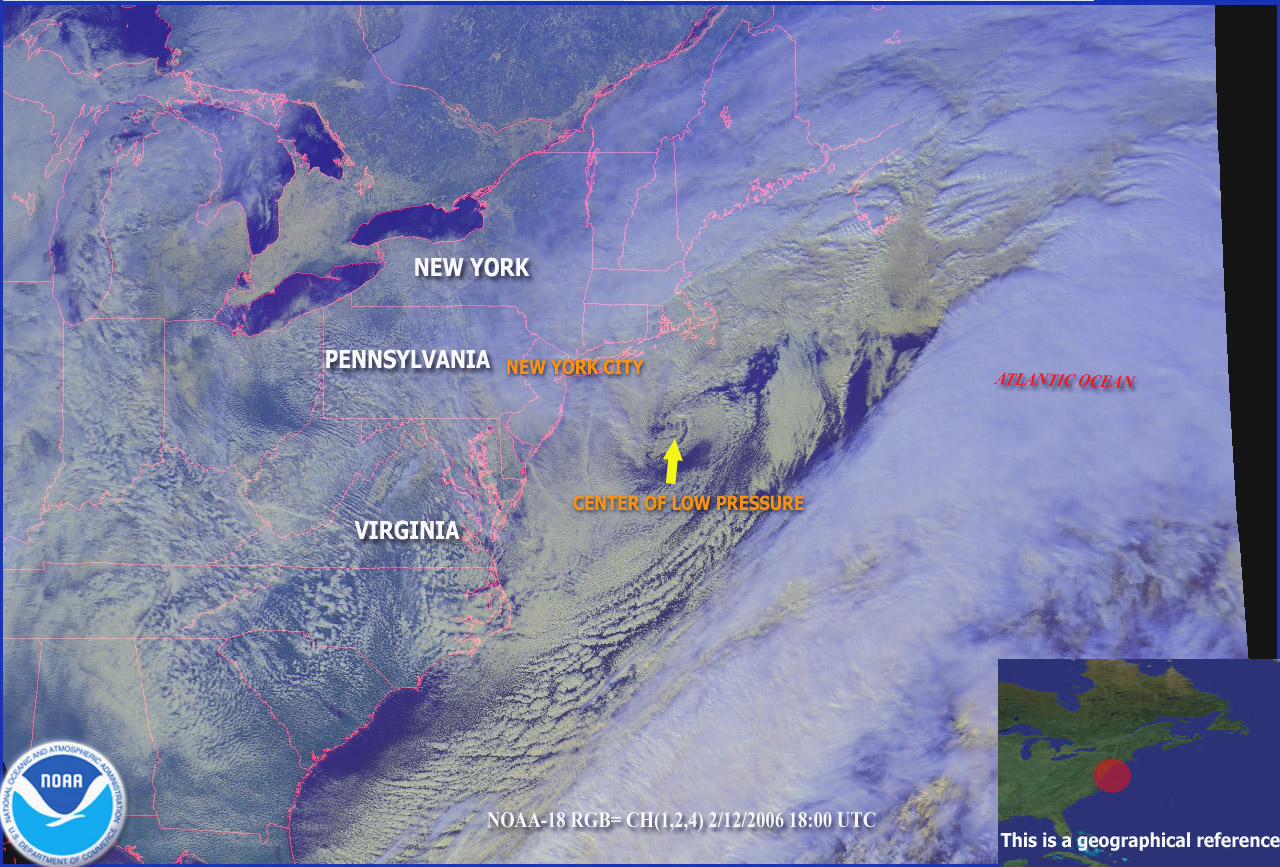
A NOAA satellite image of the storm with descriptions and points of reference

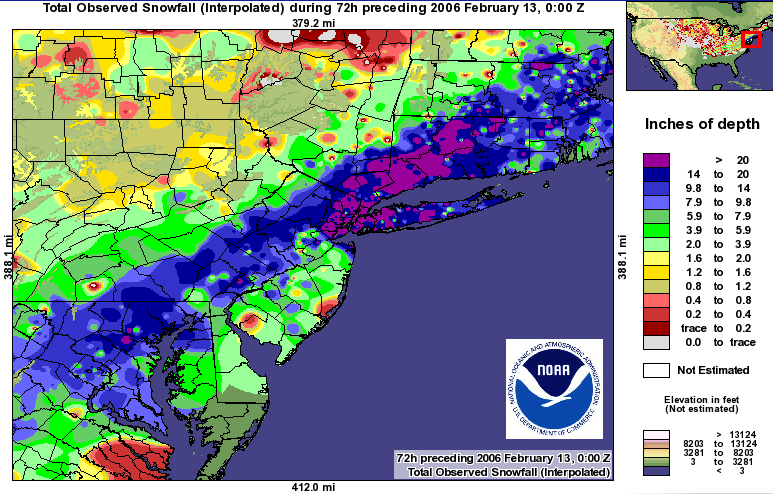
North American blizzard of 2006 snowfall accumulation for the Northeastern United States from the National Weather Service

Only accumulations of 8 inches (20 cm) or greater are listed. Not all observations are listed due to space limitations; only major communities and notable reports are listed.

State	City/location	Amount in inches (cm)
CT	Fairfield	27.8 (70.6)
NJ	Rahway	27.0 (68.6)
CT	West Hartford	27.0 (68.6)
NY	Manhattan (Central Park)	26.9 (68.3)
CT	Danbury	26.0 (66.0)
NY	LaGuardia Airport	25.4 (64.5)
NY	Bronx	24.5 (62.2)
NY	New Rochelle	24.5 (62.2)
NY	Brewster	24.0 (61.0)
NY	Yonkers	23.9 (60.7)
CT	Waterbury	23.0 (58.4)
MD	Randallstown	22.0 (55.9)
MA	Wilbraham	22.0 (55.9)
CT	Bradley Airport	21.9 (55.6)
MD	Columbia	21.3 (54.1)
NJ	Newark Airport	21.3 (54.1)
CT	East Granby	21.0 (53.3)
NJ	East Brunswick	21.0 (53.3)
NJ	Hoboken	20.7 (52.8)
CT	Greenwich	20.4 (51.8)
NY	Islip	20.0 (50.8)
NY	New City	20.0 (50.8)
CT	Norwalk	20.0 (50.8)
NJ	Randolph Township	20.0 (50.8)
NY	Woodbury (Nassau County)	20.0 (50.8)
RI	Foster	19.0 (48.3)
NJ	Ridgewood	19.0 (48.3)
NJ	Glen Rock	18.7 (47.5)
PA	Willow Grove	18.5 (47.0)
RI	Cumberland	18.2 (46.2)
MA	Cambridge	18.2 (46.2)
PA	Birdsboro	18.2 (46.2)
MA	Worcester	18.0 (45.8)
MA	Salem	18.0 (45.8)
PA	Langhorne	17.5 (44.5)
MA	Logan Airport	17.5 (44.5)
NJ	Clinton	17.4 (44.2)
MA	Leominster	17.4 (44.2)
NJ	Trenton	17.0 (43.2)
NJ	Edison	17.0 (43.2)
MA	Needham	17.0 (43.2)
NY	JFK Airport	16.7 (42.4)
NH	Nashua	16.5 (41.9)
NJ	Somerville	16.5 (41.9)
ME	East Machias	16.0 (40.6)
CT	New Haven	16.0 (40.6)
RI	Woonsocket	15.8 (40.1)
VA	Linden	15.5 (39.4)
MA	Boston Common	15.5 (39.4)
CT	Hartford (Downtown)	15.5 (39.4)
MD	Glen Burnie	15.3 (38.9)
PA	Allentown	15.2 (38.6)
MD	Baltimore	15.0 (38.0)
MD	Elkton	15.0 (38.0)
NH	Hollis	15.0 (38.0)
MD	Westminster	15.0 (38.0)
DE	Wilmington	14.4 (36.6)
MD	Gaithersburg	14.3 (36.3)
RI	Cumberland	14.0 (35.6)
VA	Fairfax	14.0 (35.6)
MA	Gloucester	14.0 (35.6)
NJ	Lumberton	14.0 (35.6)
CT	Norwich	14.0 (35.6)
NH	Salem	14.0 (35.6)
VA	Falls Church	13.5 (34.3)
MA	Plainville	13.5 (34.3)
MD	BWI Airport	13.1 (33.3)
NJ	Ewing	13.1 (33.3)
PA	Easton	13.0 (33.0)
MD	Hagerstown	13.0 (33.0)
VA	Manassas	13.0 (33.0)
CT	Bridgeport	12.5 (31.8)
PA	Philadelphia (Downtown)	12.5 (31.8)
VA	Haymarket	12.3 (31.2)
TN	Gatlinburg	12.0 (30.5)
ME	Kennebunk	12.0 (30.5)
PA	Philadelphia Airport	12.0 (30.5)
MA	Springfield	11.0 (27.9)
NY	Lynbrook	11.0 (27.9)
MD	Frederick	10.5 (26.7)
WV	Harpers Ferry	10.0 (25.4)
VA	Arlington	10.0 (25.4)
WV	Martinsburg	10.0 (25.4)
ME	Southwest Harbor	9.5 (24.1)
RI	Providence (Downtown)	9.0 (22.9)
VA	Winchester	8.9 (22.6)
DC	Washington (Capitol Hill)	8.8 (22.4)
VA	Dulles Airport	8.1 (20.6)

Sources: National Weather Service local offices – Sterling, Virginia, Mount Holly, New Jersey, Upton, New York, Taunton, MA, Caribou, Maine, Gray, Maine

== See also ==
- April 2007 nor'easter
- Cyclogenesis
- Extratropical cyclone
