= Hazel Miner =

American blizzard victim (1904–1920)

Hazel Dulcie Miner
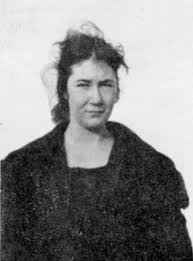
- Hazel Miner. Courtesy: Center County Republican.
- Born: April 11, 1904; Sanger, North Dakota, US
- Died: March 16, 1920 (aged 15); Center, North Dakota, US
- Cause of death: Hypothermia resulting from exposure to cold
- Monuments: One, near Oliver County Courthouse; 47.114491°N 101.299806°W
- Occupation: student
- Known for: Died protecting siblings from the 1920 North Dakota blizzard

Hazel Dulcie Miner (April 11, 1904 – March 16, 1920) was an American student at a rural Great Plains one-room school, who died while protecting her 10-year-old brother, Emmet, and 8-year-old sister, Myrdith, from the spring blizzard of 1920 in Center, North Dakota.

After her death, she became a national American heroine. Her actions were celebrated in a folk ballad and were published in many newspaper and magazine articles in the subsequent decades.

== Life and family ==
Hazel was the 15-year-old daughter of William Albert Miner, a farmer, and his wife, the former Blanche Steele, both originally from Riceville, Iowa. The family had lived for a time in Staples, Minnesota but had returned to their farm in North Dakota the year before the blizzard. Hazel's sisters and brothers were Zelda, 21; Emmet, 10; Myrdith, 8; and Howard, 5. Hazel was an eighth grade student at a one-room school, the same attended by Emmet and Myrdith. The Oliver County register of deeds, whose daughter had played with Hazel, recalled, "Kind of a quiet girl she was," and described her as "sort of motherly, for one so young." Her father considered her highly dependable. Her obituary described her as "quiet and loving," with a "sunny, cheerful nature" and having a liking for children. Hazel had planned to start high school in Bismarck, North Dakota that fall.

== Death in the blizzard ==
=== Miner children lose their way ===
On March 15, 1920, the first day of the blizzard, the school dismissed its students early to enable them to go home before the storm arrived. Many of the students, like the Miner children, were used to driving to and from school with a horse and buggy, but the school teacher had a rule that no child was permitted to drive home in bad weather without permission from a parent. William Miner, who was worried about the blizzard conditions, rode the two miles to the school on a saddle horse to escort his children home.

At about one o'clock in the afternoon, at the school, Miner hitched the children's horse, "Old Maude," to their light sleigh and told Hazel to wait while he went back to the school's barn to get his horse. Hazel wasn't strong enough to keep the horse from heading out into the blizzard before her father came back from the barn. William Miner searched for his children, but soon realized they must have gotten lost and went home to organize a search party. Via telephone, farm families from the surrounding countryside summoned men to join the search for the missing Miner children.

Even though she was familiar with the road, Hazel quickly became disoriented due to the blinding, blowing white snow, which made it impossible to see more than a few feet in front of her. She was dressed in warm coat, hat, gloves and sturdy, one-buckle overshoes, but the clothing was insufficient protection against the wind and freezing temperatures, and her hands and feet became numb in the cold. When the sleigh hit a coulee, Hazel slid from the sleigh into waist-deep, mushy snow. She said, "Oh, my! I am wet clear to the waist and my shoes are full of water," her brother recalled later. Her prolonged exposure virtually guaranteed eventual severe hypothermia.

The horse's harness slipped and Hazel had to readjust it. She led the horse forward through the blizzard, but found she had lost sight of the road. There were few landmarks on the prairie to guide the children.

=== Shelter of last resort ===
The children continued traveling and growing more tired and cold. Then the sleigh again hit an obstruction and tipped over, throwing Hazel over the dashboard into the snow. Hazel, Emmet, and Myrdith tried to push the sleigh upright, but were not strong enough to lift it, even with all three pushing at once. Using the overturned sleigh as a shelter, Hazel spread two blankets, told Emmet and Myrdith to lie down, and placed a third blanket atop them. The children tried to keep moving to stay warm. Hazel huddled beside her brother and sister and used her body heat to warm them. She told them stories to keep them awake. The children sang all four verses of "America the Beautiful," a song they had sung during opening exercises at the country school that morning, and repeated the Lord's Prayer. Hazel advised her siblings, "Remember, you mustn't go to sleep — even if I do. Promise me you won't, no matter how sleepy you get. Keep each other awake! Promise?" Her brother and sister promised.

Throughout the night, the children could hear a dog barking somewhere nearby, but no one came to their aid. As the night wore on, Hazel talked less and less, until she finally became silent.

Her brother Emmet later recalled the blizzard for an article in the March 15, 1963 issue of The Bismarck (N.D.) Tribune:

The robe kept blowing down and Hazel kept pulling it up until she got so she couldn't put it up any more. Then she covered us up with the robe and lay down on top of it. I told Hazel to get under the covers too, but she said she had to keep us children warm, and she wouldn't do it ... I tried to get out to put the cover over Hazel, but I could not move because she was lying on the cover. The snow would get in around our feet, we couldn't move them, then Hazel would break the crust for us. After awhile she could not break the crust anymore, she just lay still and groaned. I thought she must be dead, then I kept talking to Myrdith so she wouldn't go to sleep.

=== Search and rescue ===
A search party of more than thirty men looked for the children throughout the afternoon and evening. They had to give up when it grew dark, but set out again the next morning. When they finally found the children, it was two o'clock in the afternoon on March 16, twenty-five hours since the children had first set out from the school house. The overturned sleigh, with the horse still hitched up to it, was resting in a coulee two miles south of the school. "With breathless haste we harried to the rig and will never forget the sight that met our eyes," one of the men reported. The searchers found the rigid Hazel lying over her siblings, covering them with her body. Her coat, which she had unbuttoned, was spread over the bodies of the two younger children and her arms were stretched out over them. Beneath her, still alive, were Emmet and Myrdith. "Maude," the old horse, was standing beside the overturned sled, also still alive. If the horse had moved, the three children would have been tipped into the snow.

They took the three children to the home of William Starck, a neighbor, for immediate care. Starck's daughter, Anna Starck Benjamin, who was 4½ years old at the time, remembered "the sound of Hazel's outstretched arms as they brushed against the furniture as they brought her into the house, and took her into my parents' bedroom. The crackling sound as that of frozen laundry brought in off the clothes line in winter. Then I remember the crying, so much crying." They worked over Hazel for hours, trying to revive her, but without success. Hazel's mother, Blanche, was brought to the Starck house after the searchers found the children and sat in a chair, rocking back and forth, while they tended to the three children. Throughout the night when the children were missing, she had been kept company by neighbors. At one point, she drifted off to sleep, and said later that her daughter had come to her in a dream. In the dream, Hazel said, "I was cold, Mama, but I'm not anymore."

At Hazel's funeral, the minister preached a sermon on the Christian Bible verse John 15:13: "Greater love hath no man that he lay down his life for his friend," and said, "Here and there are occasionally people who by their acts and lives endeavor to imitate Him."

Hazel was one of 34 people who died during the blizzard, which lasted three days.

== Legacy ==
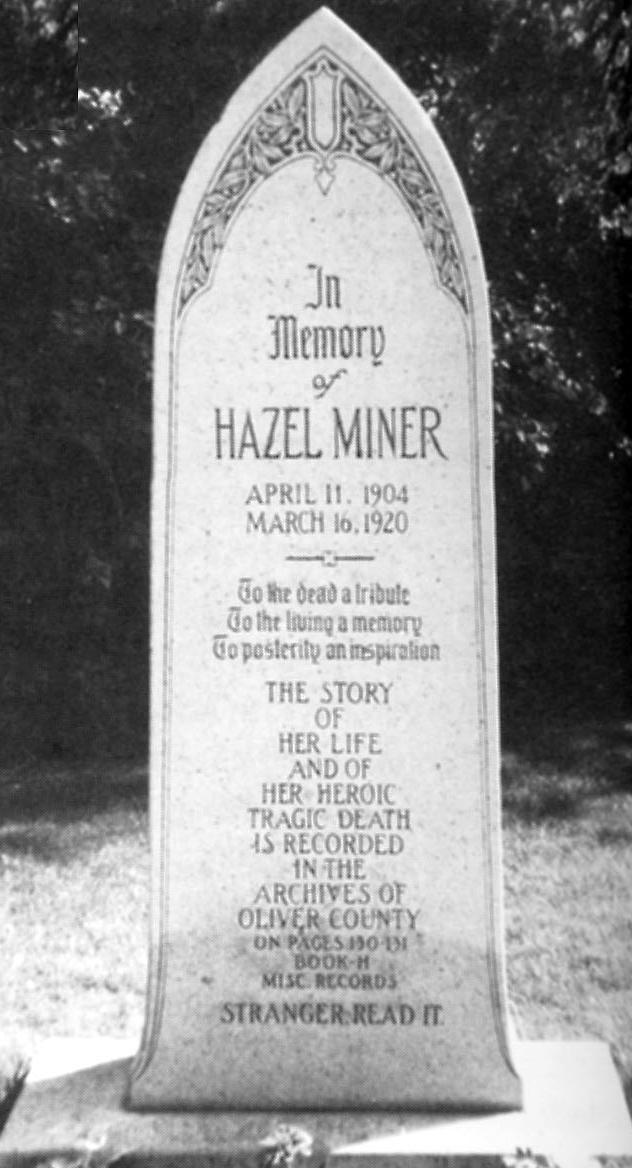
This memorial to Hazel Miner was installed in 1936 outside the Oliver County Courthouse by former governor L.B. Hanna. Courtesy: Center (N.D.) Republican.

Hazel became a posthumous heroine after her story became known. On January 15, 1921, an article in The North Dakota Children's Home Finder appeared about how "this guardian angel of the prairies, covered with a thick sheet of ice, gave up her own life to save her brother and sister." The North Dakota Children's Home Society wanted to use publicity about Hazel's story to raise money to build an orphanage for children in the state. A memorial committee was established in Center and talked of naming a new hospital in Hazel's honor, but some months later her parents said they wanted a memorial statue erected instead. Children across the state collected money to pay for a memorial.

Emmet and Myrdith were interviewed by various North Dakota newspapers numerous times in the years following the blizzard and many news articles were written about Hazel. Emmet's grandson told a reporter that Emmet rarely spoke about the story to his family and he thinks Emmet had never gotten over the traumatic experience and "never forgave himself" for his sister's death. The story eventually attracted national attention. In 1952 the Ford Motor Company commissioned two paintings of scenes from the story by North Dakota artist Elmer Halvorson. The paintings and an article about Hazel Miner were published in the February 1953 edition of the Ford Times.

In recent years, a folk ballad entitled The Story of Hazel Miner was written by folk artist Chuck Suchy of Mandan, North Dakota. The song was recorded on Suchy's Much to Share (1986) cassette and on his Dancing Dakota (1989) cassette. In the song, recalling Hazel's outstretched arms, Suchy sings of "wings on the snow, a fate not chose, morning finds a dove so froze." But "in warmth below, her love survived."

The May 30, 2002 centennial issue of the Center (N.D.) Republican featured a story about "Hazel Miner, Angel of the Prairies." The story was also recounted in Joe Wheeler's 2002 anthology Everyday Heroes: Inspiring Stories of Ordinary People Who Made a Difference. A retired Mandan, North Dakota elementary teacher, Kevin Kremer, wrote a 2019 children's book called Angel of the Prairie based on the story of Hazel Miner.

A Gothic-style granite monument honoring Hazel's memory was erected in front of the Oliver County Courthouse in 1936, sixteen years after her death, by former North Dakota governor L. B. Hanna. The stone reads "In memory of Hazel Miner. To the dead a tribute, to the living a memory, to posterity an inspiration." Hazel's grave can be found in the Center Community Cemetery in Oliver County.

The story of Hazel and her actions during the 1920 blizzard are also studied by some students in North Dakota as part of a North Dakota history class.

North Dakota Governor Doug Burgum proclaimed March 16, 2020 “Hazel Miner Day” in honor of Hazel and of the 100th anniversary of the blizzard. The town of Center, North Dakota held a ceremony on that date at which Chuck Suchy sang The Story of Hazel Miner and tours were given of places significant to her life and death. A roadway in Center is named Hazel Miner Avenue in her honor.

== Hazel's Heart ==
On December 23,2025 the movie "Hazel's Heart was released by Canticle Productions. Written and Directed by Daniel Bielinski, the film captures the story well, though some of the details are different than the events in 1920. Two of the director's children were in the film and portrayed the two siblings saved by Hazel's sacrifice.

== See also ==
- Wohlk brothers (1920 blizzard victims)
- Mrs. Andrew Whitehead
- 1920 North Dakota blizzard
- Schoolhouse Blizzard
- Racheltjie de Beer

== Bibliography ==
- Jackson, William (2003). The Best of Dakota Mysteries and Oddities. Dickinson, North Dakota: Valley Star Books. ISBN 0-9677349-5-9.
