= Sanger, North Dakota =

Sanger
- Ghost town
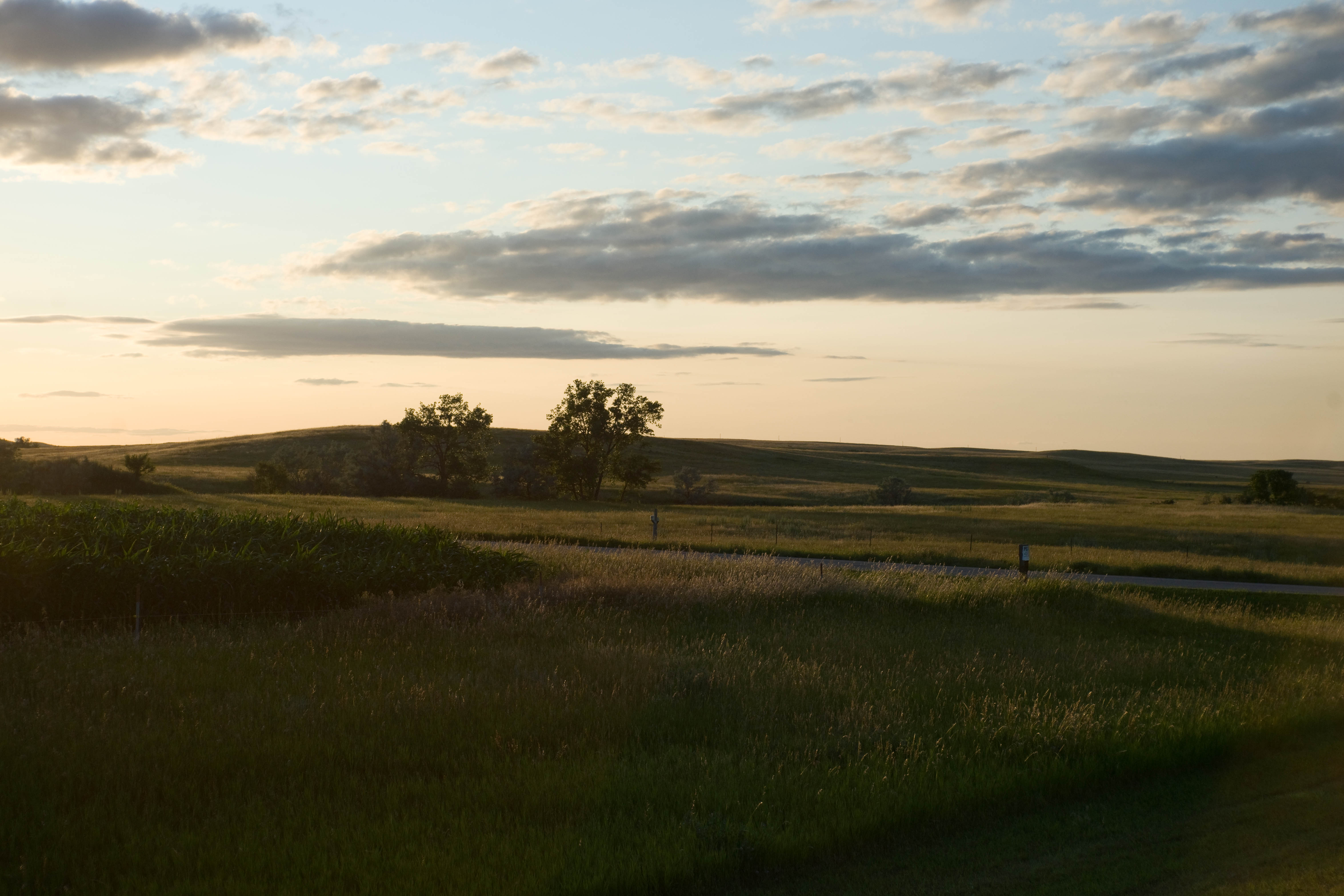
- A vista of Sanger

- Location within the state of North Dakota
- Coordinates: 47°10′47″N 100°59′44″W
- Country: United States
- State: North Dakota
- County: Oliver
- Elevation: 1,706 ft (520 m)
- Time zone: UTC-6 (Central (CST))
  - Summer (DST): UTC-5 (CDT)
- ZIP codes: 58530
- Area code: 701
- GNIS feature ID: 1031352

Sanger is an unincorporated community and former ghost town in Oliver County, North Dakota, United States. The population in 2023 was 2; there are no businesses or services.

Founded in 1879, the town was originally known as Bentley. The town declined during the 20th century, and was fully abandoned by 1985.

Sanger is located about 40 miles north from Bismarck, and is a short distance from the west bank of the Missouri River. There is a directional sign on the highway.

It was the county seat until 1884, when the community was renamed Sanger. Never a large community, Sanger is most notable for being the birthplace of Hazel Miner, a local heroine who sacrificed her life to save her brother and sister in the 1920 North Dakota blizzard.
