= Blizzard of 1888 (disambiguation) =

Two major blizzards occurred in the year 1888.

- The Great Blizzard of 1888 which struck parts of the eastern United States and Atlantic Canada from March 11 to March 14
- The so-called Schoolhouse Blizzard which affected the northern Great Plains on January 12
