= I Survived =

I Survived may refer to:

- I Survived..., a documentary television series produced by NHNZ that airs on Lifetime Movie Network and on Court TV
- I Survived (book series), children's historical fiction novels by American author Lauren Tarshis
- I Survived: Hindi Sumusuko Ang Pinoy (English: I Survived: Filipinos Don't Give Up), a reality drama program aired by ABS-CBN
