= Chuck Suchy =

American singer-songwriter

Chuck Suchy is a folk musician, songwriter, and working farmer from Mandan, North Dakota. Among his albums are Much to Share (1986) and Dancing Dakota (1989) on Flying Fish Records, Dakota Breezes (1993), Same Road Home (1996), Different Line of Time (1999), Evening in Paris (2004), and Unraveling Heart (2008).

Chuck Suchy is North Dakota's Official State Troubadour.

One of his folk ballads, featured on his Much to Share, Dancing Dakota, and Dakota Breezes CDs, is The Story of Hazel Miner. The folk ballad tells the story of Hazel Miner, a 15-year-old girl who died saving her brother and sister during a March 1920 blizzard in Center, North Dakota.

His song "Burma Shave Boogie" (from his 2008 Unraveling Heart CD) incorporates several rhymes from old Burma-Shave roadside signs into its lyrics.

His song "Indian Dreamer" (from his 1999 Different Line of Time CD) celebrates both the Indian (motorcycle) and a father's youth as revealed to his son.
