= Racheltjie de Beer =

Afrikaner heroine (1831–1843)

Rachel De Beer
- Born: 1831; Cradock, Cape Colony
- Died: 1843 (aged 11–12)
- Cause of death: Hypothermia
- Other name: Racheltjie de Beer
- Known for: Afrikaner Heroine
- Parent(s): Dapper George Stephanus de Beer; Martha Maria Luttig
- Relatives: Dirkie de Beer (Brother)

Rachel de Beer ([raˈχæl də ˈbiər], 1831–1843) (sometimes known by the diminutive form, Racheltjie) is an Afrikaner heroine, who gave her life in order to save that of her brother, Dirkie de Beer. She was the daughter of George Stephanus de Beer (b. 1794).

It is also thought that Rachel was the daughter of Matthys Stephanus Johannes de Beer and Rachel Susanna de Beer (née Geere). Matthys was born in 1801 and was murdered along with Piet Retief in 1838. Rachel Susanna was also born in 1801 but died in 1821/1822, about 6 months after giving birth to her son, also Matthys. They were from Graaff-Reinet.

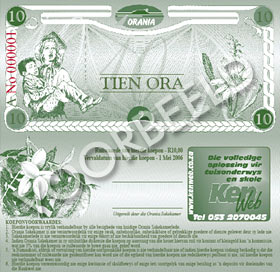
Racheltjie de Beer on the Tien Ora banknote

== Story Van Racheltjie De Beer ==
In the winter months of 1843 Rachel the 12 year old was part of a trek from the Orange Free State to the south-eastern Transvaal. During one of their nightly stopovers, the members of the trek realised that a calf called Frikkie, much-beloved by their children, was missing.

A search party was formed, in which Rachel and her six-year-old brother also took part. However, during the gathering dusk Rachel and her brother got separated from the search party and became lost. As the night progressed it got very cold and started snowing.

Realizing that their chances of survival were slim, Rachel found an anthill hollowed out by an aardvark, took off her clothes, put them on her brother and commanded him to get into the hollowed-out anthill. She then laid in front of the opening of the anthill in order to keep out the cold.

The children were found the next morning by the trekking party. Rachel had died during the night, but her brother had survived.

== Story in modern culture ==
Rachel de Beer is entrenched in the Afrikaner culture, which is evident by the number of streets and schools named after her, and musical pieces which have been inspired by her such as a theatrical performance from 2019.

== Genealogical perspective ==
In the very comprehensive genealogical work “The De Beer Family – Three centuries in South Africa” several pages are devoted to the Rachel de Beer story, looking at all the possibilities from the available genealogical data.

It turns out that there was a De Beer family that fits the names and ages as mentioned in the original story quite closely. However, they lived 60 years later. If the incident happened in 1903 instead of 1843, this family would fit the facts quite nicely. It would also better explain why there is no mention of this story before the early 1900s.

By the third edition of the work more information has come to light to also eliminate this last possible scenario. The Rachel de Beer in this instance has been confirmed to have lived well into adulthood.

Based on this research it seems unlikely that the story of Rachel de Beer is factual. Further evidence indicates this folk story is rather copied from an actual American girl, Hazel Milner.

== Family Tree ==
Zacharias de Beer
Samuel de Beer
Dina Margaretha Van Dyk
George Stephanus de Beer
Jacob de Villiers
Anna Eleanora de Villiers
Debora du Toit
Rachel de Beer
Hartwig Johannes Luttig
Helmoet Hartwig Luttig
Magdalena du Plessis
Martha Maria Luttig
Martha Maria de Villiers

== Historical debate ==
In October 2012, two Afrikaans journalists published their findings that the story of Racheltjie de Beer bears many similarities to that of the American heroine Hazel Miner. They wrote about it in the tabloid By, a weekly supplement of the three Afrikaans newspapers Die Burger, Beeld, and Volksblad. The very first story about Rachel appeared in print only about a month or three after the North Dakota Children's Home Finder gave Hazel Miner's (true) story the wider publicity that it had deserved. The Afrikaans journalists also posted a more elaborate paper on their findings to the web under the title Die laaste rits bewyse: Racheltjie is bloot 'n afspieëling van Hazel Miner (The last series of evidences
