= Lauren Tarshis =

American children's book author

- Lauren Tarshis in 2026
- Born: Lauren Tarshis; November 23, 1963 (age 62); Albuquerque, New Mexico, U.S.
- Education: Barnard College
- Occupation: Author
- Writing career
- Language: English
- Period: 1988–present
- Genre: Children's literature
- Subject: History
- Website: www.laurentarshis.com

Lauren Tarshis (born November 23, 1963) is an American author of children's books, with several series of fiction, non-fiction and historical fiction works found in thousands of libraries and translated into several languages.

She is the author of the New York Times bestselling series I Survived. The historical fiction books, aimed at children in grades 3–5, focus on historical disasters from the perspective of a child.

She is also the author of Emma-Jean Lazarus Fell Out of a Tree, a Golden Kite honor book for fiction and Oprah's Book Club pick, and the sequel Emma-Jean Lazarus Fell in Love. The books are on many state lists and are often used by schools as part of anti-bully programs.

Tarshis is SVP editor-in-chief and publisher of the Classroom Magazine Division at Scholastic, Inc., which includes Storyworks magazine, a language arts magazine for children in grades 3-6 that she has edited for several years.

== Bibliography ==
Title	Publication date	Type	Notes
The Making of Ironweed	March 1, 1988	Non-fiction	
Taking Off: Extraordinary Ways to Spend Your First Year Out of College	January 1, 1989	Non-fiction	
Kate: The Katharine Hepburn Album	February 1, 1993	Non-fiction	
Emma-Jean Lazarus Fell Out of a Tree	May 15, 2008	Fiction	
Emma-Jean Lazarus Fell In Love	May 13, 2010	Fiction	
I Survived the Sinking of the Titanic, 1912	June 1, 2010	Historical fiction	
I Survived the Shark Attacks of 1916	September 1, 2010	Historical fiction	
I Survived Hurricane Katrina, 2005	March 1, 2011	Historical fiction	
I Survived the Bombing of Pearl Harbor, 1941	October 1, 2011	Historical fiction	
I Survived the San Francisco Earthquake, 1906	March 1, 2012	Historical fiction	
I Survived the Attacks of September 11, 2001	July 1, 2012	Historical fiction	
I Survived the Battle of Gettysburg, 1863	February 1, 2013	Historical fiction	
I Survived the Japanese Tsunami, 2011	August 27, 2013	Historical fiction	
I Survived the Nazi Invasion, 1944	February 25, 2014	Historical fiction	
I Survived the Destruction of Pompeii, A.D. 79	August 26, 2014	Historical fiction	
I Survived the Great Chicago Fire, 1871	February 24, 2015	Historical fiction	
I Survived the Joplin Tornado, 2011	August 25, 2015	Historical fiction	
I Survived the Hindenburg Disaster, 1937	February 21, 2016	Historical fiction	
I Survived the Eruption of Mount St. Helens, 1980	August 30, 2016	Historical fiction	
I Survived the American Revolution, 1776	August 29, 2017	Historical fiction	
I Survived the Children's Blizzard, 1888	February 28, 2018	Historical fiction	
I Survived the Attack of the Grizzlies, 1967	September 25, 2018	Historical fiction	
I Survived the Battle of D-Day, 1944	January 29, 2019	Historical fiction	
I Survived the Great Molasses Flood, 1919	September 3, 2019	Historical fiction	
I Survived the California Wildfires, 2018	September 1, 2020	Historical fiction	
I Survived the Galveston Hurricane, 1900	September 7, 2021	Historical fiction	
I Survived the Wellington Avalanche, 1910	September 6, 2022	Historical fiction	
I Survived the Great Alaska earthquake, 1964	November 7, 2023	Historical fiction	
I Survived the Black Death, 1348	October 15, 2024	Historical fiction	
I Survived the Dust Bowl, 1935	October 7, 2025	Historical fiction	
I Survived The Night of the Lions, 2025	September 15, 2026	Historical fiction	
I Survived True Stories: Five Epic Disasters	September 30, 2014	Non-fiction	
I Survived True Stories #2: Nature Attacks!	September 29, 2015	Non-fiction	
I Survived True Stories #3: Tornado Terror True Tornado Survival Stories and Amazing Facts from History and Today	February 28, 2017	Non-fiction	
I Survived the Sinking of the Titanic, 1912 graphic novel	February 4, 2020	Graphic novel - historical fiction	I Survived graphic novel #1
I Survived the Shark Attacks of 1916 graphic novel	June 2, 2020	Graphic novel - historical fiction	I Survived graphic novel #2
I Survived the Nazi Invasion, 1944 graphic novel	February 2, 2021	Graphic novel - historical fiction	I Survived graphic novel #3
I Survived the Attacks of September 11, 2001 graphic novel	August 3, 2021	Graphic novel - historical fiction	I Survived graphic novel #4
I Survived the Attack of the Grizzlies, 1967 graphic novel	May 3, 2022	Graphic novel - historical fiction	I Survived graphic novel #5
I Survived Hurricane Katrina, 2005 graphic novel	October 18, 2022	Graphic novel - historical fiction	I Survived graphic novel #6
I Survived the Great Chicago Fire, 1871 graphic novel	May 2, 2023	Graphic novel - historical fiction	I Survived graphic novel #7
I Survived the American Revolution, 1776 graphic novel	September 5, 2023	Graphic novel - historical fiction	I Survived graphic novel #8
I Survived the Battle of D-Day, 1944 graphic novel	April 2, 2024	Graphic novel - historical fiction	I Survived graphic novel #9
I Survived the Destruction of Pompeii, AD 79 graphic novel	July 2, 2024	Graphic novel - historical fiction	I Survived graphic novel #10
I Survived the Great Molasses Flood, 1919 graphic novel	March 4, 2025	Graphic novel - historical fiction	I Survived graphic novel #11
I Survived the Japanese Tsunami, 2011 graphic novel	August 5, 2025	Graphic novel - historical fiction	I Survived graphic novel #12
I Survived the California Wildfires, 2018 graphic novel	February 3, 2026	Graphic novel - historical fiction	I Survived graphic novel #13
I Survived the Bombing of Pearl Harbor, 1941 graphic novel	July 7, 2026	Graphic novel - historical fiction	I Survived graphic novel #14

== Emma-Jean Lazarus books ==
- Emma-Jean Lazarus fell out of a tree (2007), in over 1,600 WorldCat libraries (reviewed by Bulletin of the Center for Children's Books)
  - Translated into French as Pourquoi Emma-Jane est tombée de l'arbre, et ce qui s'ensuivit... (2010)
  - Translated into German as Emma-Jean und das Geheimnis des Glücks (2009)
  - Translated into Japanese as エマ・ジーン・ラザルス、木から落ちる / Ema jīn razarusu ki kara ochiru (2008)
- Emma-Jean Lazarus fell in love (2009), in over 1,000 WorldCat libraries
  - Translated into German as Emma-Jean und das Geheimnis der Freundschaft (2011)

== I Survived series ==
Tarshis has written 25 books for the I Survived series as of April 2023. These are historical fiction books about children who survive different disasters throughout history, including storms, wars, battles, genocides, terrorist attacks, and wild animal attacks. The tagline for the series is "When Disaster Strikes, Heroes Are Made." The books are published by Scholastic Inc.

The first book in the series, published in 2010, is I Survived the Sinking of the Titanic, 1912.

The latest book in the series, published in 2025, is I Survived the Dust Bowl, 1935.

In 2018, the first of six I Survived books in Spanish were released for the U.S. market: Sobreviví los Ataques de Tiburones de 1916 (I Survived the Shark Attacks of 1916). In 2019, two more titles were released: Sobreviví el Naufragio del Titanic, 1912 (I Survived the Sinking of the Titanic, 1912), and Sobreviví el Terremoto de San Francisco, 1906 (I Survived the San Francisco Earthquake, 1906). In 2020, a fourth title was released: Sobreviví el huracán Katrina, 2005 (I Survived Hurricane Katrina, 2005). Two more Spanish language I Survived titles were released in 2021, Sobreviví el Bomdardeo de Pearl Harbor, 1941 (I Survived the Bombing of Pearl Harbor, 1941) and Sobreviví los ataques del 11 de septiembre de 2001 (I Survived the Attacks of September 11, 2001).

Tarshis has also written three non-fiction books for the I Survived True Stories spin-off series, featuring some of the real events that the I Survived historical fiction books are based on. I Survived True Stories #1: Five Epic Disasters was released in 2014, followed in 2015 by I Survived True Stories #2 Nature Attacks!, and by I Survived True Stories #3 Tornado Terror in 2017.

In 2020, two new graphic novels were released: I Survived The Sinking of the Titanic, 1912 and I Survived The Shark Attacks of 1916.

I Survived books have been translated into ten languages: Chinese, Czech, French, Japanese, Korean, Romanian, Russian, Spanish, Swedish, and Vietnamese.

== Other works ==
- The making of Ironweed (1988), also written by Claudio Edinger and William Kennedy
