= Storyworks =

American children's literary magazine

- Editor: Lauren Tarshis
- Categories: Children's magazine
- Frequency: Monthly
- Publisher: Scholastic Press
- Founder: Lauren Tarshis
- Founded: 1993
- Country: United States
- Based in: Jefferson City, Missouri
- Website: storyworks.scholastic.com

Storyworks is a literary magazine published in the United States by Scholastic Inc., for students in grades 3-6 and their teachers. The magazine was founded in 1993 by Scholastic editor Tamara Hanneman. It is published six times during the academic year. Each issue features fiction, nonfiction, poetry and a play. The magazine also publishes numerous writing prompts, word games, contests, and short articles related to reading and writing. An accompanying Teacher's Edition provides ideas and guidelines for using the magazine in the classroom. It is now edited by Lauren Tarshis, who is also the author of many children's books including the New York Times bestselling I Survived series. The Storyworks editorial headquarters are in New York City and its distribution center is in Jefferson City, Missouri.
