= 1888 Northwest United States cold wave =

Weather event in the United States

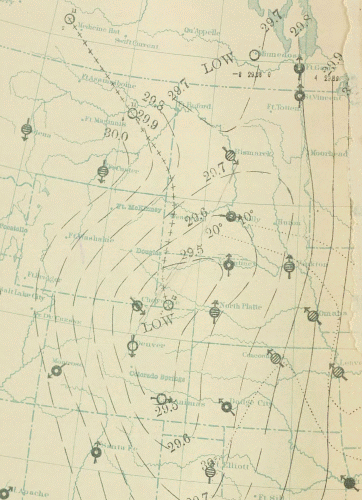
Weather map showing cyclone centered in Colorado. Cold advection behind this system led to the record cold snap.

In mid-January 1888, a severe cold wave passed through the northern regions of the Rocky Mountains and Great Plains of the United States, then considered to be the northwestern region of the nation. It led to a blizzard for the northern Plains and upper Mississippi valley where many children were trapped in schoolhouses where they froze to death. This tragedy became known as the Schoolhouse Blizzard, Schoolchildren's Blizzard, or The Children's Blizzard. This cold snap and blizzard were part of a month when temperatures averaged below normal by 6 to 12 °F (3.3 to 6.7 °C) across much of the northern and western United States.

== Synoptic overview ==
The cold wave was initiated by a storm system which dropped southward from Canada on January 11 into Colorado on January 12 and onward into the Great Lakes on January 13. The subsequent cold wave extended all the way into the citrus growing areas of southern California. The cyclone led to a blizzard across Nebraska, North Dakota, and Minnesota. Since there had recently been a warm spell, many people were caught off guard by the cold and snow. Hundreds of adults and children alike fell victim, while thousands of cattle died during the event.

== Severity of the event ==
Record low temperatures were set, including −65 °F (−53.9 °C) at Fort Keogh (near Miles City, Montana) on January 14. At the time, it was the lowest temperature ever recorded in the continental United States. It was not until 1933 that a lower temperature was read in the lower 48 states (−66 °F or −54.4 °C in West Yellowstone, Montana).

Other notable records set during this cold wave are −41 °F (−40.6 °C) in St. Paul, Minnesota, −30 °F (−34.4 °C) in Spokane, Washington, −28 °F (−33.3 °C) in Boise, Idaho, −2 °F (−18.9 °C) in downtown Portland, Oregon, 1 °F (−17.2 °C) in Newport, Oregon, and 20 °F (−6.7 °C) in Eureka, California. All of these readings still stand as the record low for each location. Further, high temperatures of −10 °F (−23.3 °C) in Spokane and 9 °F (−12.8 °C) in Portland still stand as the coldest maximum temperatures ever recorded.

In Denver, while not record setting, temperatures fell to −18 °F (−27.8 °C) while winds peaked at 60 mph (97 km/h). In California on January 14, temperatures fell to 20 °F (−6.7 °C) in Eureka and 29 °F (−1.7 °C) in San Francisco.

== See also ==
- Siberian Express
- Great Blizzard of 1888 for the blizzard that happened on the East Coast in March 1888
