= Wohlk brothers =

American children who died in a blizzard in 1920

Herman, Soren, Ernest, and Adolph Wohlk (died March 16, 1920) were four young Ryder, North Dakota brothers who died during a blizzard as they made their way home from school. The three-day blizzard, which lasted from March 15 to March 18, 1920, killed 34 people across the state, including the more famous Hazel Miner.

Adolph, 14, Ernest, 13, Soren, 10, and Herman, 9, were the four oldest sons of Gust Wohlk, a German emigrant from Schleswig-Holstein, Germany. Their father was the former bodyguard to Field Marshal Paul von Hindenburg. The boys, who were the only students to attend school that day, decided to drive their horses and sled the two miles home from their one-room school. They made it to within three quarters of a mile from the farm, but had to stop when their horses could pull the sled no further. The eldest brother, Adolph, bundled up his siblings and left them to find help. His father, Gust Wohlk, found the 14-year-old's body within a quarter mile of their farm. Gust Wohlk found his three younger sons curled up together in the box of the wagon. One of the boys was dead and the two others were dying.
