= Schoolhouse Blizzard =

January 1888 blizzard in the United States

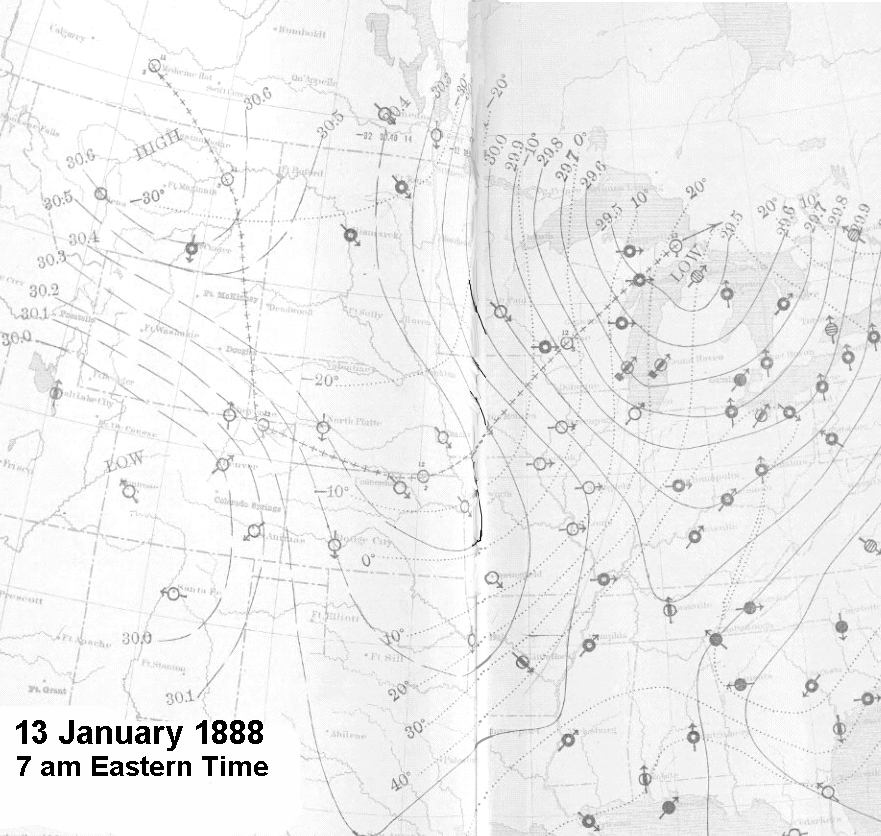
- Surface analysis of Blizzard on January 13, 1888.

Meteorological history
- Formed: January 12, 1888
- Dissipated: January 13, 1888

Blizzard
- Lowest temp: −56.8 °F (−49.3 °C) in Poplar River (Montana-Saskatchewan)
- Max. snowfall: 6 inches (15 cm)

Overall effects
- Fatalities: 235 fatalities
- Areas affected: Great Plains

The Schoolhouse Blizzard, also known as the Schoolchildren's Blizzard, School Children's Blizzard, or Children's Blizzard, hit the U.S. Great Plains on January 12, 1888. With an estimated 235 deaths, it is the world's 10th deadliest winter storm on record.

== Description ==
The blizzard came unexpectedly on a relatively warm day, and many people were caught unaware, including children in one-room schoolhouses.

The weather prediction for the day was issued by the Weather Bureau, which at the time was managed by Brigadier General Adolphus Greely. The indications officer (forecaster), Lieutenant Thomas Mayhew Woodruff in St. Paul, Minnesota, said: "A cold wave is indicated for Dakota and Nebraska tonight and tomorrow; the snow will drift heavily today and tomorrow in Dakota, Nebraska, Minnesota, and Wisconsin."

On January 11, a strengthening surface low dropped south-southeastward out of the Alberta District in Canada's North-West Territories into central Montana Territory and then into northeastern Colorado by the morning of January 12. The temperatures in advance of the low increased some 20 to 40 °F (11–22 °C) in the central plains (for example, Omaha, Nebraska, recorded a temperature of −6 °F (−21 °C) at 7 a.m. on January 11, while the temperature had increased to 28 °F (−2 °C) by 7 a.m. on January 12). The strong surface low rapidly moved into southeastern Nebraska by 3 p.m. on January 12 and finally into southwestern Wisconsin by 11 p.m. that same day. On January 11, the massive cold air mass that had formed around January 8 around Medicine Hat and Qu'Appelle, Assiniboia District, had reached a spread of over 780 miles (1,255 km).

The blizzard was precipitated by the collision of an immense Arctic cold front with warm moisture-laden air from the Gulf of Mexico. Within a few hours, the advancing cold front caused a temperature drop from a few degrees above freezing to −20 °F (−29 °C) [−40 °F (−40 °C) in some places]. This wave of cold was accompanied by high winds and heavy snow. The fast-moving storm first struck Montana in the early hours of January 12, swept through Dakota Territory from midmorning to early afternoon, and reached Lincoln, Nebraska, at 3 p.m.

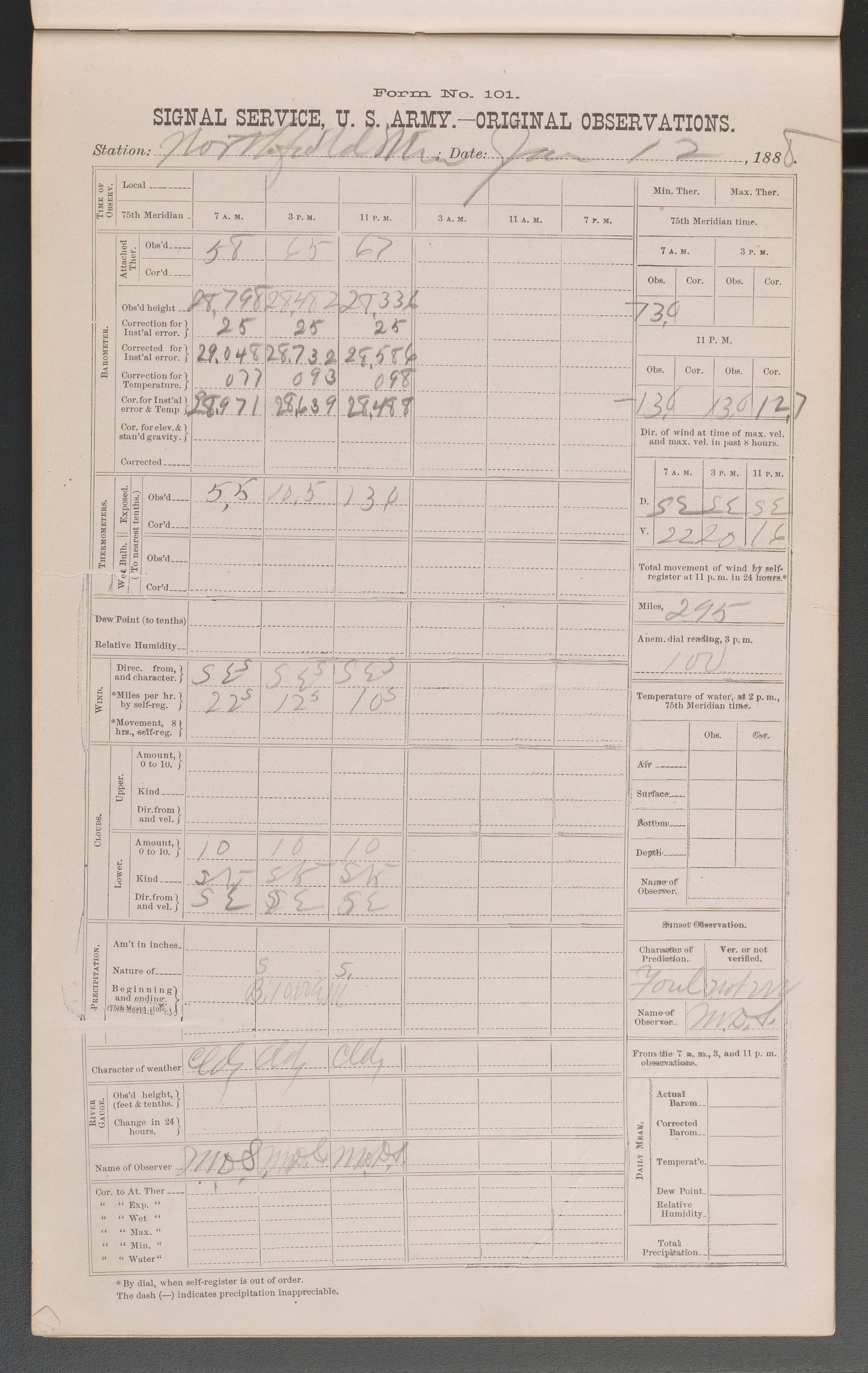
A routine work on January 12, 1888, recorded at Carleton College Weather Service, Northfield, Minnesota

Many who were caught unaware misjudged the weather due to a warm spell. Carl Saltee, a teenage Norwegian immigrant in Fortier, Minnesota, remembered that "... on the 12th of January 1888 around noontime it was so warm it melted snow and ice from the window until after 1 p.m." This changed rapidly for the teenager who continued that by 3:30 p.m. "A dark and heavy wall built up around the northwest coming fast, coming like those heavy thunderstorms, like a shot. In a few moments, we had the severest snowstorm I ever saw in my life with a terrible hard wind, like a Hurricane, snow so thick we could not see more than 3 steps from the door at times." The Boston Daily Advertiser reported under the headline "Midnight at Noon" that "At Fargo ... mercury 47° below zero and a hurricane blowing ... At Neche, Dak. the thermometer is 58° below zero."

What made the storm so deadly was the timing (during work and school hours), the suddenness of the storm, and the brief spell of warmer weather that preceded it. In addition, the very strong wind fields behind the cold front and the powdery nature of the snow reduced visibilities on the open plains to zero. People ventured from the safety of their homes to do chores, go to town, attend school, or simply enjoy the relative warmth of the day. As a result, thousands of people — including many schoolchildren — got caught in the blizzard. The death toll was 235, though some estimate 1,000. Teachers generally kept children in their schoolrooms. Exceptions nearly always resulted in disaster.

This cold front was so self-reinforced that it dropped temperatures as far south as the Mexican state of Veracruz before dissipating.

Travel was severely impeded in the days following.

Two months later, yet another severe blizzard hit the East Coast states: This blizzard was known as the Great Blizzard of 1888. It severely affected the east coast, in states like New York and Massachusetts.

== The stories ==
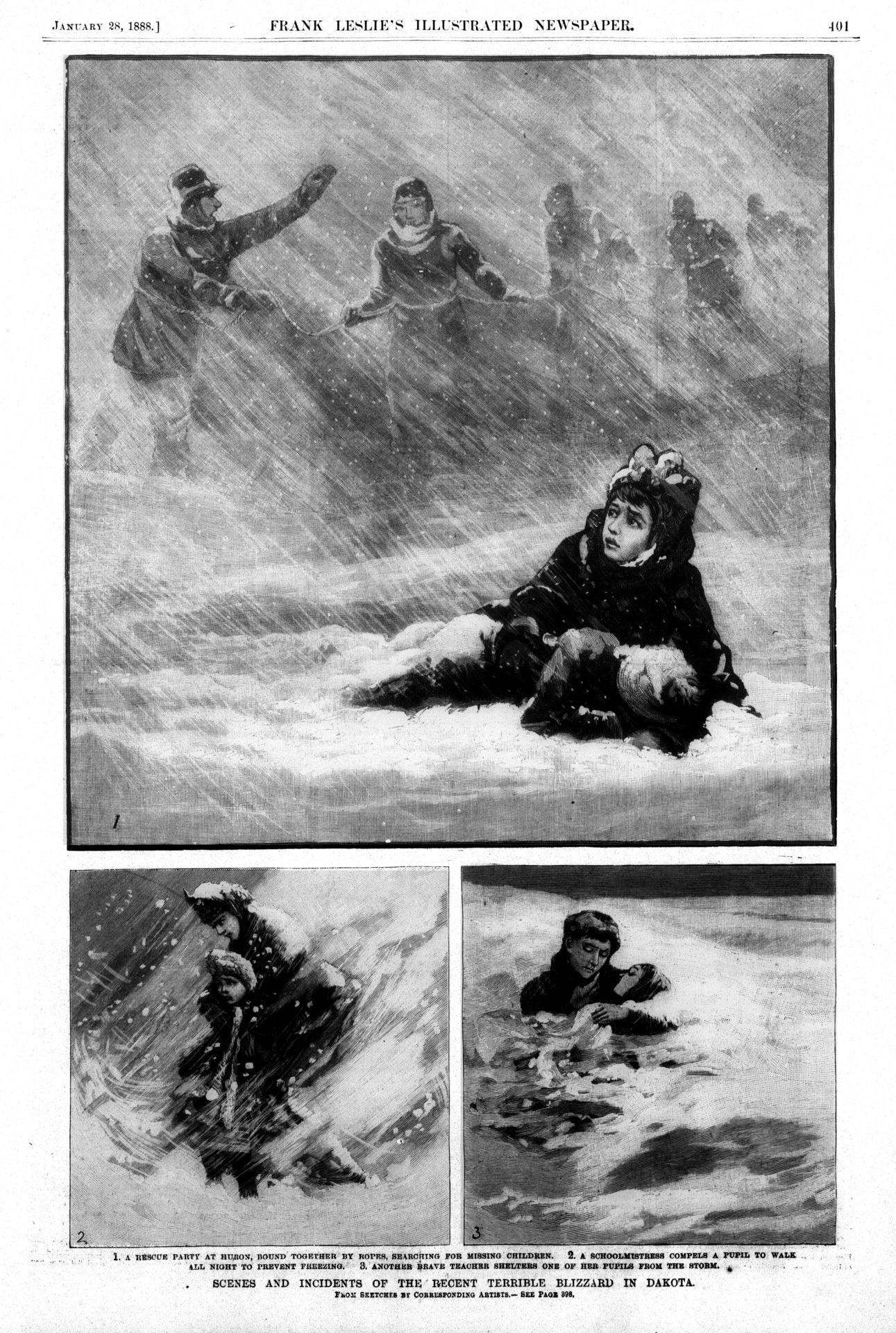
Scenes and Incidents from the Recent Terrible Blizzard in Dakota on January 12, 1888

- Plainview, Nebraska: Lois Royce found herself trapped with three of her students in her schoolhouse. By 3 p.m., they had run out of heating fuel. Her boarding house was only 82 yards (75 m) away, so she attempted to lead the children there. However, visibility was so poor that they became lost. The children, two 9-year-old boys and a 6-year-old girl, froze to death. The teacher survived, but her feet were frostbitten and had to be amputated.
- Seward County, Nebraska: Etta Shattuck, a 19-year-old schoolteacher, got lost on her way home and sought shelter in a haystack. She remained trapped there until her rescue 78 hours later by Daniel D. Murphy and his hired men. She died on February 6 or 7 due to complications from surgery to remove her frostbitten feet and legs.
- Near Zeona, Dakota Territory: The children at the local school were rescued. Two men tied a rope to the closest house and headed for the school. There, they tied off the other end of the rope and led the children to safety.
- Mira Valley, Nebraska: Minnie Freeman safely led 13 children from her schoolhouse to her home, one and a half miles (2.4 km) away. A rumor that she used a rope to keep the children together during the blinding storm is widely circulated, but one of the children claimed it was not true. That year, "Song of the Great Blizzard: Thirteen Were Saved" or "Nebraska's Fearless Maid", was written and recorded in her honor by William Vincent and published by Lyon & Healy.
  - In 1967, for Nebraska's Centennial Celebration, a Venetian glass mural of the Schoolhouse Blizzard of 1888 by Jeanne Reynal was installed on the west wall of the north bay in the Nebraska State Capitol building. The mural, in a semi-abstract style, portrays Freeman leading the children through the storm to safety.
- A 36-year-old Scottish immigrant farmer, James Jackson, just outside of Woodstock, Minnesota, discovered his cattle herd frozen to death in a 10-mile (16 km) stretch.
- Newspaperman Charles Morse, founder of the Lake Benton News, recounted, "My sleeping quarters were on the second floor leading off a hallway at the head of the stairs ... On arriving home I found the wind had forced open the door and the stairway was packed with snow, and when I reached my room I found my bed covered with several inches of snow which had filtered over the threshold and through my keyhole."
- Pioneers William and Kate Kampen, who lived in a small sod house in Marion, Dakota Territory, were caught ill-prepared for the blizzard. They ran out of coal for their fire, so William was forced to leave for the town of Parker, some 23 miles (37 km) away to buy more coal and supplies. He took two of his horses with him. While William was gone, 19-year-old Kate gave birth alone to their first son, Henry Royal Kampen, on January 8. While William was in town, the blizzard hit. Several of William's friends tried to persuade him to stay in town, but he knew he had to get back home to Kate, not knowing she had given birth. The storm raged on as he tried to make his way back home. He stayed with his horses, but eventually, both of them died because the wind was so strong that both the horses suffocated. William was able to find a barn with pigs in it, and crawled in with them to try to keep warm. Meanwhile, Kate kept herself and the baby warm by staying in bed. William finally made it back home to Kate and the baby after spending three days and nights out on the prairie alone.

== Memorial book ==
In the 1940s a group organized the Greater Nebraska Blizzard Club to write a book about the storm. The resulting book, In All Its Fury: A History of the Blizzard of Jan. 12, 1888, With Stories and Reminiscences, was edited by W.H. O'Gara.

== In popular culture ==
- Ted Kooser, a Nebraska poet, has recorded many of the stories of the Schoolhouse Blizzard in his book of poetry The Blizzard Voices.
- Ron Hansen, a Nebraska-born author, follows the experience of the blizzard from a variety of perspectives in his short story "Wickedness", featured in the collections Nebraska and She Loves Me Not.
- Lauren Tarshis published a book in February 2018 about the Children's Blizzard in her I Survived book series, focusing on a character named John.
- Melanie Benjamin published a book in 2023, Albin Michel Editions The Children's Blizzard (Les enfants du blizzard in French) focusing on two school teachers and their pupils.

== Affected states and territories ==
- Dakota Territory
- Nebraska
- Kansas
- Minnesota
- Montana Territory
- Wyoming Territory
- Idaho Territory

== See also ==
- 1888 Northwest United States cold wave
- List of Minnesota weather records
- 1920 North Dakota blizzard
- Pleasant Hill bus tragedy
