= 1920 North Dakota blizzard =

Weather event in North Dakota, United States

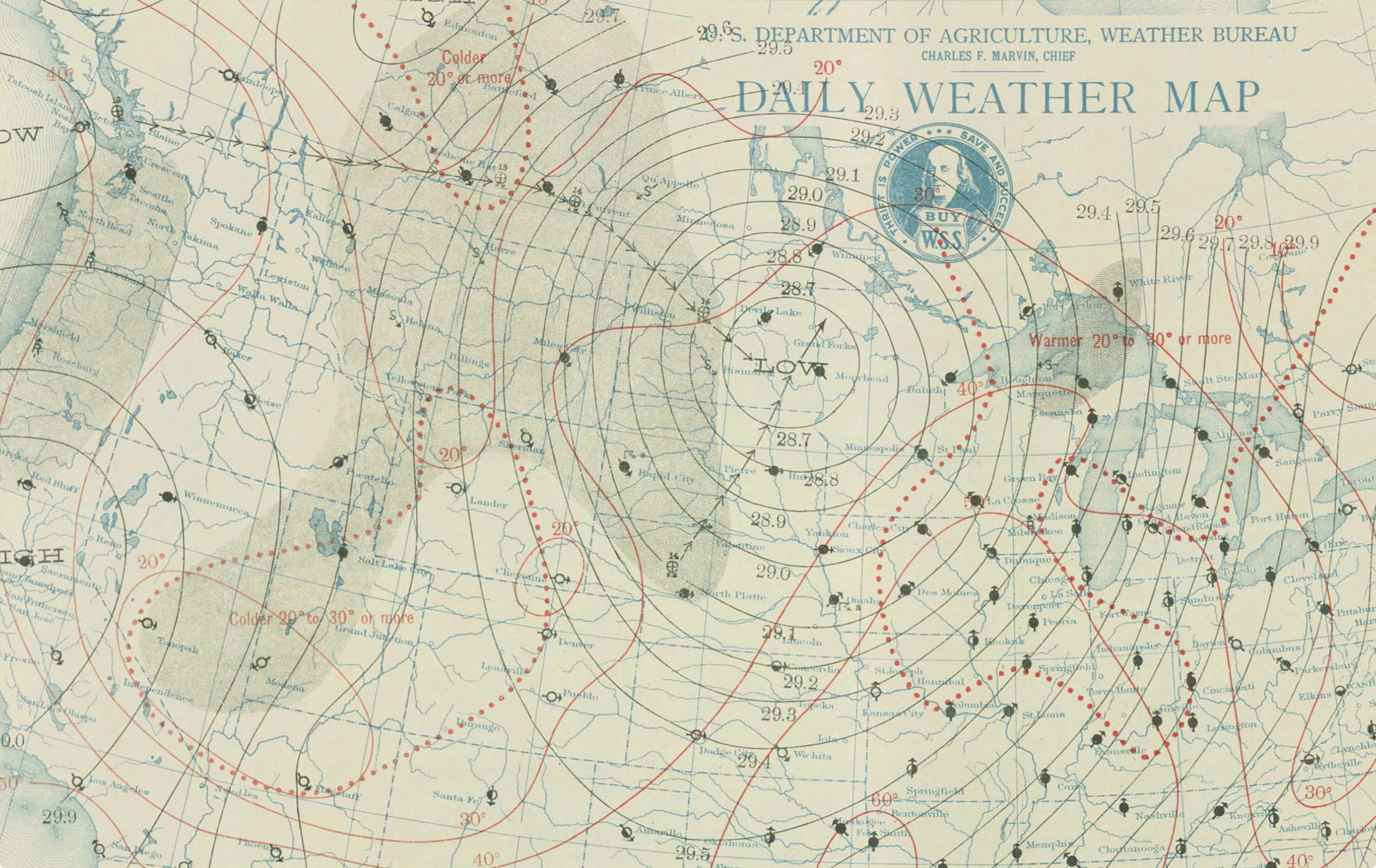
Surface weather analysis of the storm on March 15

The 1920 North Dakota blizzard was a severe blizzard that killed 34 people from March 15–18, 1920 in the state of North Dakota. It is considered among the worst blizzards on record in North Dakota.

High winds and an eight-inch (20 cm) snowfall stopped rail service in Bismarck, North Dakota, and only one telephone line functioned between Fargo, North Dakota, and Minneapolis, Minnesota. Telephone service was out between Devils Lake, North Dakota, and Fargo, North Dakota.

Among the victims were five country school students, including Hazel Miner and Adolph, Ernest, Soren, and Herman Wohlk. Also killed were a young mother, Mrs. Andrew Whitehead; Charles Hutchins, north of Douglas, North Dakota; the twelve-year-old son of Matt Yashenko, who lived five miles south of Ruso, North Dakota; and "Chicken Pete" Johnson, a Minot eccentric, who was found dead in his dug-out on South Hill in Minot, North Dakota.

== See also ==
- Schoolhouse Blizzard

== Related reading ==
- Kremer, Kevin Angel of the Prairie (Snow in Sarasota Publishing) https://www.kevinkremerbooks.com/store/p1/Angel_of_the_Prairie_.html
