= I Survived (children's book series) =

Historical fiction series by Lauren Tarshis

I Survived is a children's historical fiction series written by Lauren Tarshis and published by Scholastic Inc. The first book in the series was published in 2010, and there are now 26 books in total. The series follows fictional child protagonists who survive major historical events, such as the sinking of the Titanic, Hurricane Katrina, and the Black Death. Written for middle-school-aged students, the books combine thrilling survival stories with historical education, introducing young audiences to significant global events through the perspective of children. The tagline of the series is "When disaster strikes, heroes are made."

The series is one of Scholastic's most recognized children's franchises, printing over 30 million copies as of December 2025. Critics and educators have praised the books for making difficult historical subjects accessible to young readers while encouraging interest in history, resilience, and empathy. The popularity of the series has also led to graphic novel adaptations of the original chapter books, as well as I Survived True Stories.

== Background and development ==
Before writing the I Survived series, Tarshis worked as an editor for Scholastic Magazine. She has stated in interviews and author materials that each book requires extensive historical research, often involving reading at least 20 nonfiction books about the specific disaster before writing begins. She has stated she tries to submerge herself into the time period she is writing about, trying to understand the mindsets of the people living through the events.

Rather than focusing on well-known historical figures, the series emphasizes ordinary children placed in extraordinary circumstances. This narrative structure creates an intimate perspective on large-scale disasters and historical crises. Scholastic's educational materials express that the books are designed to support literacy development while building historical awareness in classroom settings.

=== Themes and historical events ===
The series covers a wide range of historical disasters, including natural disasters, wars, and human-caused events. Scholastic describes the series as having a subject or time period that will spark the interest of any student.

==== Natural disasters ====
Natural disaster-focused books in the series include events such as hurricanes, earthquakes, tsunamis, wildfires, and volcanic eruptions. These stories emphasize survival strategies, environmental vulnerability, and the emotional impact of natural catastrophes. Furthermore, Scholastic categorizes these stories as displaying "How people, cities, and nations band together to overcome natural disasters."

==== Wars and human conflict ====
Other books in the series address wars and political conflicts, including the events of World War II and the American Civil War. These stories highlight themes of the dangers and costs of war, along with the human stories behind the violence.

==== Unnatural disasters and terrorist attacks ====
The third category of books in the series is human-caused disasters and terrorist attacks. These stories discuss the tragic events that have altered the course of history. Tarshis has said that when she writes books dealing with complex or sensitive issues, she omits certain details so only the issues readers can comprehend are addressed. She tries to give readers a sense of closure, avoiding falsely happy endings.

=== Reception and educational use ===
Scholarly analysis of the series has examined its framing of environmental and historical crises through the perspective of child protagonists. One academic study argues that the series often constructs disaster narratives through the "white, innocent child" perspective, shaping how vulnerability and crises are understood in children's literature. The study also argues that the series uses natural catastrophes as an avenue to introduce children to the environment and offers the potential to educate them as "ecocitizens."

The I Survived series has been widely praised for its accessibility and educational value. Teachers and librarians frequently use the books in classrooms to introduce historical events to middle-school-aged readers in an engaging format. The books are also noted for their appeal to reluctant readers, primarily due to their fast-paced and suspense-driven structure.

In a 2020 NPR discussion, commentators noted that the books resonate especially during periods of widespread anxiety and uncertainty. Tarshis is acclaimed for her world-building before and during the disaster, providing readers with accounts from resilient characters.

=== Cultural impact ===
Since its debut, the series has become one of the most commercially successful franchises in its age group, becoming a New York Times Bestselling series. The series has contributed to broader discussions in children's literature regarding the representation of historical trauma, environmental disaster, and crisis narration. Tarshis wants readers to take away not just stories of survival, but "healing, finding help, and being patient about recovering from something scary."
