= Pleasant Hill bus tragedy =

1931 Colorado blizzard school bus disaster

Details
- Date: March 26, 1931
- Location: Near Towner, Colorado
- Coordinates: 38°17′30.7″N 102°05′06.0″W
- Country: United States
- Service: School Bus
- Incident type: Exposure to weather
- Cause: School bus stalled in blizzard

Statistics
- Bus: 1
- Passengers: 20
- Crew: 1
- Deaths: 6
- Injured: 15

The Pleasant Hill bus tragedy happened on March 26, 1931, near Towner, Colorado, United States, when a spring blizzard caused the deaths of five school children and their bus driver, while the rest of the students had to wait 33 hours for rescue.

== Build-up to tragedy ==
Towner, Colorado, was served by the two one-room school houses, one for grades 1–6 and the other for grades 7–8. Two school buses, one for the east side and one for the west side, took the students to and from school. The east-side bus was a 1929 Chevrolet truck modified and driven by farmer and bus driver Carl Miller. On the day of the tragedy, some of the back windows were broken and cardboard was used to block the wind.

March 26, 1931, started out warm, at 60 °F (16 °C), though dark clouds were forming. The east-side bus ran the route and picked up 20 students, ranging in age from 7 to 14 years old. Due to the warmth, some students, such as Mary Louise Stonebraker, did not bring winter clothes. When the students got to school around 9 a.m., the weather had turned for the worse; temperatures dropped below freezing, and snow started to fall. At the school, the two school teachers, Maude Mosier and Franz Freiday, came to the decision that the children should be taken home because the school had no water or food, and only a small stove for heat. Miller disagreed, but the teachers overruled him. All the students returned to the two school buses. The west bus made it to a local farmhouse.

== Tragedy ==
As the east bus left the school, driven by 30-year-old Carl Miller and loaded with 20 students, the full force of the blizzard hit, with strong winds. Miller was trying to take a shortcut to get to the Untiedt farm, but he almost immediately got lost, unable to see past the radiator of the bus. Around 9:30 a.m., as they were driving around looking for a landmark, the school bus slid into a ditch on Holly–Towner Road and the engine stalled out. Miller tried to restart the engine, but packed snow and ice prevented it from starting up again.

Stuck on a bus with no heater, and with high wind that blew out the cardboard covering the missing windows (which caused snow to start to pile up inside), the situation became dire. The occupants tried to get warm by making a fire with school books, but this mostly filled the bus with smoke. Plus, their lunches had become frozen, and so they were also hungry. To stay warm, the bus driver ordered the kids to jump around.

In the afternoon, as the storm continued to rage, Miller asked two of the older students, Bryan Untiedt and Clara Smith, to go for help. They walked some distance, but they were too cold and had to turn around. The occupants continued to jump around and dance to stay warm, even through the night.

The next morning, the blizzard continued. Miller made the decision then to go find help. He told the older kids to continue to exercise and then left. Soon after he left, 13-year-old Mary Louise Stonebraker was the first child to die.

Later that second day (March 27), some of the fathers, Bud Untiedt, Ernie Johnson, and Dave Stonebraker, left their homes to find the students. Finding the school empty, they then searched the nearby area. By the evening, the storm was breaking, and Untiedt and Stonebraker found the stranded school bus. Temperatures dropped as low as −20 °F (−29 °C), with 70 miles per hour (110 km/h) winds. Upon entering the bus, they found the 17 living students; two more, 7-year-old Kenneth Johnson and 11-year-old Robert "Bobbie" Brown, had died on the bus. Loading the kids onto a wagon, they took them to Andy and Fern Reinert's farmhouse, reaching the house around 5 p.m. That night, two more students died, Mary Louise Miller, the bus driver's daughter, and Arlo Untiedt, both 8 years old. The students had been on the bus over 30 hours.

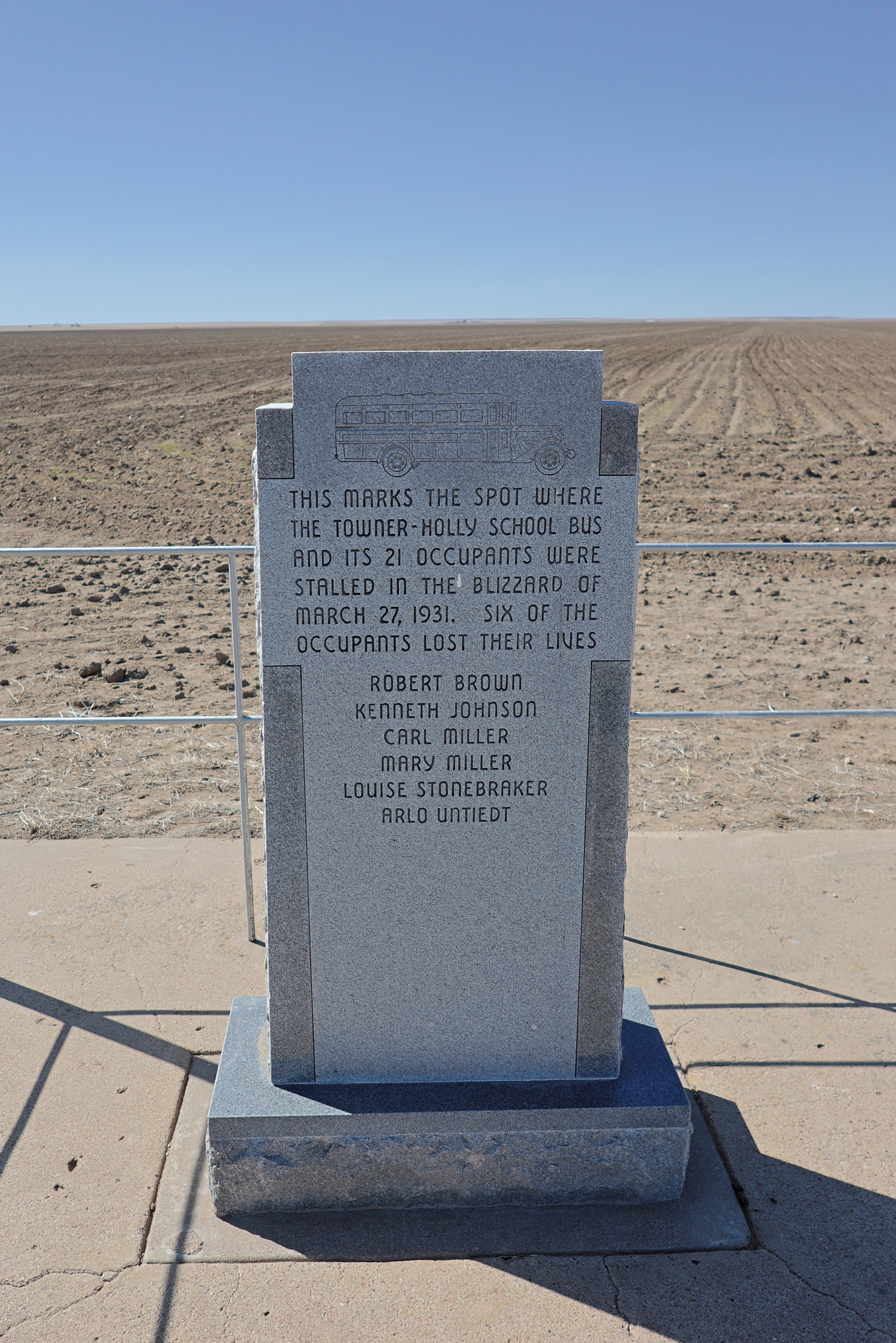
The Pleasant Hill Memorial

Miller's body was found on Saturday, March 28, 1931, frozen, 3.5 miles (5.6 km) away from the school bus. His hands were bloody from using a barbed wire fence to find help.

== Aftermath ==
The students all went to Maxwell Hospital in Lamar, and recovered, though none of them made it to the funeral, which was on March 31, 1931. The tragedy became national news, and Bryan Untiedt was invited to the White House. The survivors suffered psychologically, and some never talked about it.

The tragedy did cause reform in school buses and schools, such as adding two-way radios to all buses, and Colorado mandated all schools have a telephone. A marker is located in the Holly Cemetery in Holly, Colorado. In addition, a memorial, called the Pleasant Hill Memorial, is located alongside Kiowa County Road 78. The north-south road connects Towner and Holly, and the memorial is on the road's west side about ten miles north of Holly.
