= January 2025 North American winter storms =

January 2025 North American winter storm can refer to any of four storms that have affected North America in a two-week time period in January 2025.

- January 5–6, 2025 United States blizzard – Major winter storm and severe blizzard that brought a long swath of heavy snow stretching from the Midwestern United States to the Mid-Atlantic states from January 4–6.
- January 9–11, 2025 United States winter storm – another major winter storm that brought heavy snow to the Deep South which rarely receives snowfall from January 9–11.
- January 19–20, 2025 nor'easter – fast-moving nor'easter that affected the Northeastern United States
- January 20–21, 2025 Gulf Coast blizzard – historic blizzard that impacted the Gulf Coast of the United States, bringing record snowfall totals from southern Louisiana into the Florida Panhandle.
