= January 2025 North American cold wave =

Weather event

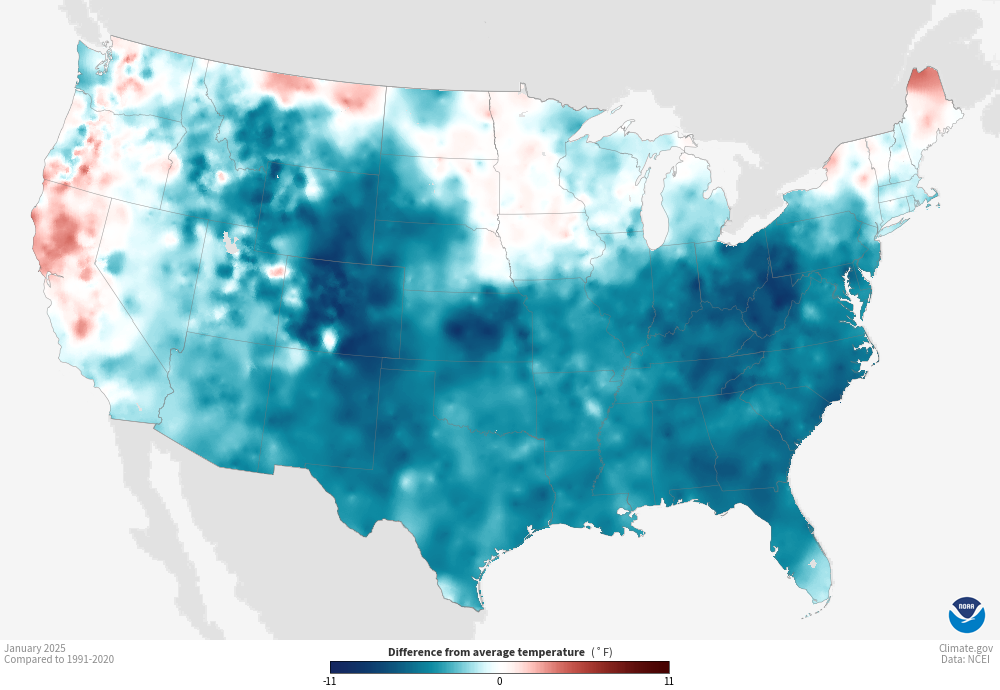
- Average mean temperature anomalies across the United States during the month of January 2025

Meteorological history
- Formed: January 2, 2025
- Dissipated: January 27, 2025

Cold wave
- Lowest temperature: −36 °C (−32.8 °F) in Saskatchewan, Canada on January 20

Overall effects
- Fatalities: 24 (Note: The death toll and damage is a combination of the January 5–6, 2025 United States blizzard, the January 20–22, 2025 Gulf Coast blizzard, and one fatality attributed to the cold directly)
- Damage: > $500 million
- Areas affected: Canada, Central United States, Eastern United States, Northern Mexico
- Part of the 2024–25 North American winter

The January 2025 North American cold wave was an extreme weather event that brought extremely cold temperatures to a majority of the Lower 48 of the continental United States, as well as the countries of Canada and Mexico throughout most of January 2025. It was the coldest January in much of the continent, especially the U.S., in at least a decade, bringing temperatures as much as 20–35 °F (11.1–19.4 °C) below average to a majority of the country. Originating from the southward migration of the polar vortex after an arctic front passed through the continent in early January, the pattern persisted for much of the month, bringing a wide swath of wintry weather across the Lower 48 of the U.S., allowing snow and ice to accumulate in regions that do not see it much at all in the Deep South.

Though similar in extent to a previous cold wave in 2021, it was not as record-breaking within the central United States, but freezing temperatures reached as far south as the Gulf Coast, breaking many temperature records there, especially in the state of Louisiana. The cold weather is estimated to have caused at least US$500 million in damages, and at least 24 deaths directly or indirectly attributed to the cold or winter weather.

== Background ==
Beginning on January 2, an arctic front began moving south from Canada, before meeting up with a significant blizzard that tracked through the eastern half of the United States from January 4–6. Following its passage, temperatures were expected to plummet across much of the country. Meteorologists also warned of a weakening polar jet stream in the aftermath, which could result in the polar vortex being disrupted enough for very cold air to spill as far south as the Mississippi Valley.

== Temperatures ==
=== Canada ===
On January 23, Saskatoon and Regina, Saskatchewan both recorded temperatures as low as −30 °C (−22 °F). Temperatures across the region reached similar levels two weeks later on January 20, when temperatures dropped as low as −36 °C (−33 °F), with wind chills of close to −50 °C (−58 °F).

=== United States ===
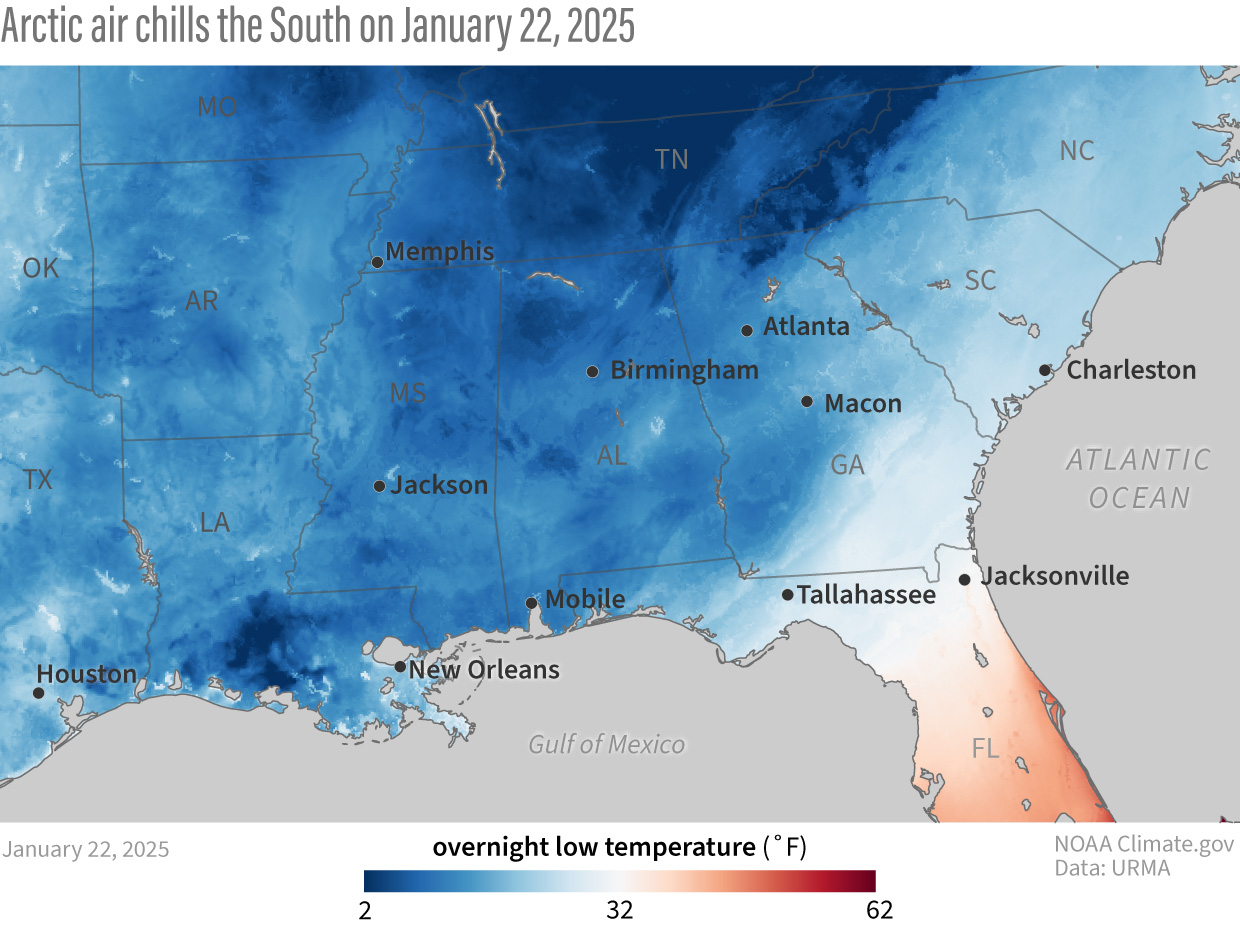
Overnight low temperatures in the Southern U.S. on January 22

In the wake of the first storm in early January, parts of Kansas experienced wind chills ranging from −5 °F (−20.6 °C) to −25 °F (−31.7 °C) on January 6. Raleigh, North Carolina, as of January 15, had its 18th-coldest January on record as of that date with an average temperature of 36.6 °F (2.6 °C). Milwaukee, Wisconsin reached a temperature of 0 °F (−17.8 °C) early on January 19, with wind chills below −10 °F (−23.3 °C). The town of Rolla, North Dakota reached a wind chill of −54 °F (−47.8 °C) early on the morning of January 20. The city of Wichita, Kansas had its coldest January temperature since 1988 on January 21, reaching −9 °F (−22.8 °C). On January 22, Kansas City set a new daily record low of −8 °F (−22.2 °C), and Pueblo, Colorado set a new daily low of −19 °F (−28.3 °C). Vineland, New Jersey saw a low of −1 °F (−18.3 °C) early on January 23, marking the coldest temperature there since 2015. Other regions within the state also reached their coldest temperature in many years, with most being the coldest since January 2018.

Beaumont, Texas set an all time monthly record low of 11 °F (−11.7 °C) for January. New record low temperatures were set in Jennings, Louisiana, New Roads, Lafayette, New Iberia at 7 °F (−13.9 °C), 4 °F (−15.6 °C), 4 °F (−15.6 °C) and 2 °F (−16.7 °C) respectively. Baton Rouge and Lake Charles also set a monthly all-time record low of 7 °F (−13.9 °C) and 6 °F (−14.4 °C) for January respectively.

== Impact ==
=== United States ===
Due to the freezing temperatures, U.S. president-elect Donald Trump announced on January 17 that his second inauguration ceremony would be moved indoors as a result, and would take place in the Capitol rotunda. This was the first time this occurred since the public second inauguration of Ronald Reagan on January 21, 1985.

An 80-year-old man was confirmed to have died on January 19 in Milwaukee, Wisconsin after falling outside and likely succumbing to hypothermia.

=== Canada ===
Extreme cold warnings were issued in much of the regions of Saskatchewan on and during the week of January 20, due to the bitterly cold temperatures. Additionally, school closures were prominent in Manitoba due to wintry weather and extreme cold as well on January 20.

== See also ==
- 1994 North American cold wave
- January–March 2014 North American cold wave
- February 2021 North American cold wave
- February 2015 North American cold wave
