= May 2025 nor'easter =

Rare late May nor'easter in 2025

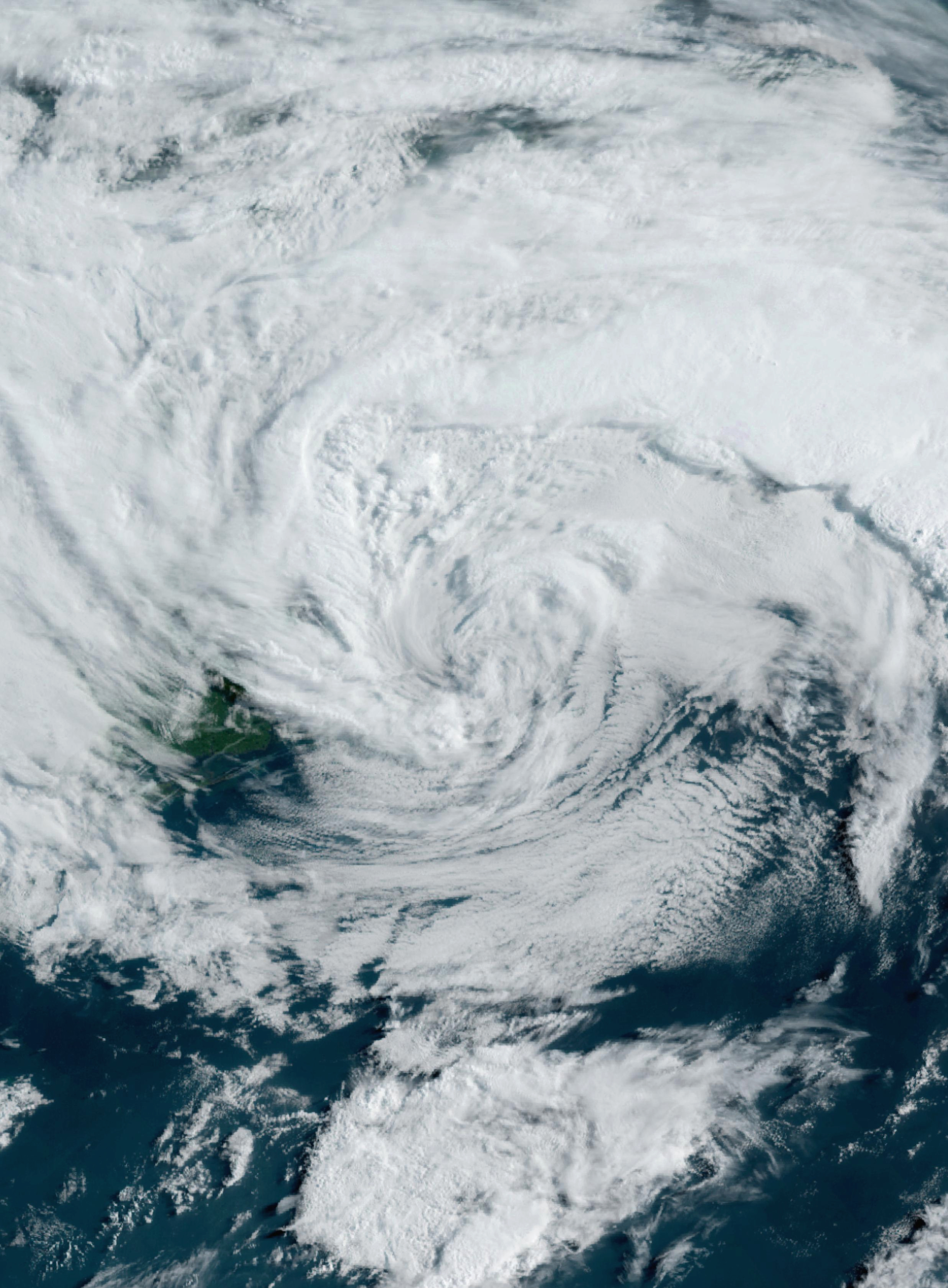
- GOES-19 satellite imagery of the nor'easter off the coast of Massachusetts early on May 23

Meteorological history
- Formed: May 21, 2025
- Dissipated: May 24, 2025

Winter storm
- Highest winds: 45 mph (75 km/h)
- Highest gusts: 74 mph (119 km/h) on Mount Washington, New Hampshire; 65 mph (105 km/h) in Plymouth, Massachusetts (non-mountain)
- Lowest pressure: 995 mbar (hPa); 29.38 inHg
- Maximum rainfall: 7.13 in (181 mm) in Kingston, Massachusetts
- Maximum snowfall or ice accretion: Snow – 12.4 in (31.5 cm) on Mount Washington, New Hampshire

Overall effects
- Fatalities: 0 direct, 2 indirect
- Areas affected: Northeastern United States, New England, Atlantic Canada
- Power outages: >34,737
- Part of the 2024–25 North American winter

The May 2025 nor'easter was an unusual and significant late-season nor'easter which impacted much of New England and Atlantic Canada with heavy rain, damaging winds, coastal flooding, and mountain snow. A Miller B nor'easter, the system originated with an area of low pressure in the Ohio Valley before spawning a secondary low over North Carolina. This low moved offshore late on May 21, steadily deepening as it tracked up the East Coast. After making landfalls on Nantucket and Cape Cod in quick succession early on May 23, the system moved into the Gulf of Maine, where it steadily weakened before making a final landfall in far northeastern Maine and dissipating inland over New Brunswick shortly thereafter.

Over 34,000 customers were left without power at the height of the storm late on May 22, primarily in southeastern New England, where rainfall totals reached 5–7 in (130–180 mm) and winds frequently gusted over 50 mph (80 km/h). Many locations experienced record cold daily high temperatures, and significant mountain snow in interior New England resulted in the return of winter conditions to trails just before the busy Memorial Day weekend and the subsequent deaths of two hikers on Mount Katahdin. Damage estimates are currently unavailable for this system.

== Meteorological history ==
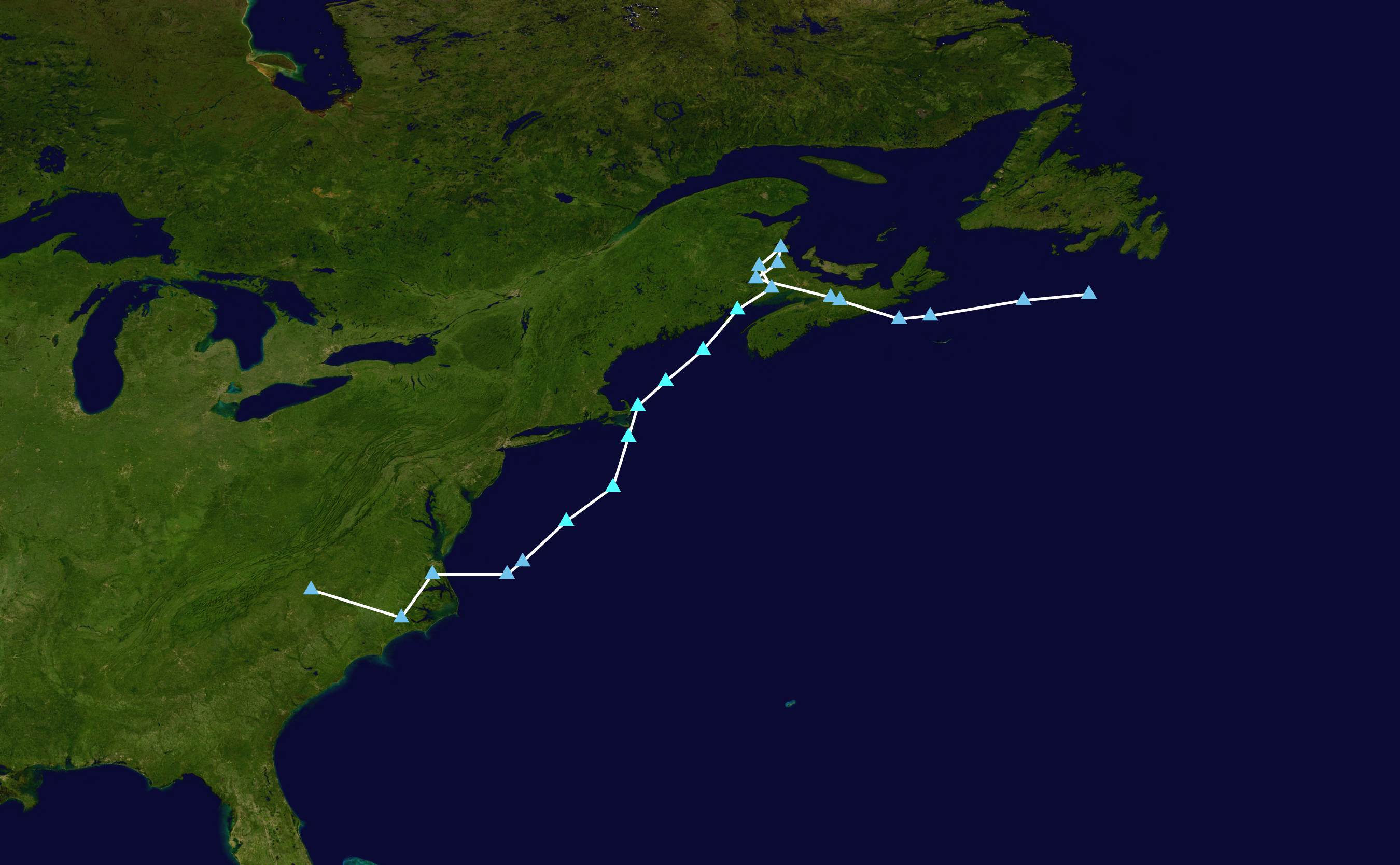
Map plotting the storm's track and intensity, according to the Saffir–Simpson scale Map key Saffir–Simpson scale Tropical depression (≤38 mph, ≤62 km/h) Tropical storm (39–73 mph, 63–118 km/h) Category 1 (74–95 mph, 119–153 km/h) Category 2 (96–110 mph, 154–177 km/h) Category 3 (111–129 mph, 178–208 km/h) Category 4 (130–156 mph, 209–251 km/h) Category 5 (≥157 mph, ≥252 km/h) Unknown Storm type Tropical cyclone Subtropical cyclone Extratropical cyclone, remnant low, tropical disturbance, or monsoon depression

An area of low pressure formed over the Colorado High Plains under a broader upper-level trough on May 18. This trough was the focus of a multi-day tornado outbreak as the low and its associated cold front meandered eastwards across the Southern Plains and into the Midwest over the next few days. By the morning of May 21, the low was centered over the Ohio Valley, and precipitation had begun to move into the interior Northeast. That afternoon, a secondary area of low pressure formed over eastern North Carolina at the intersection of the warm front associated with the original low and an outflow boundary extending southward along the Carolina coastline. A classic Miller B setup, this was the first nor'easter of any classification to form in the month of May since 2008.

By 00:00 UTC on May 22, the nor'easter had moved offshore North Carolina and began to track northwards along the East Coast. Meanwhile, the original low stalled over Lake Erie. Over the next few hours, precipitation lulled over the Northeast as energy transferred from the original low to the intensifying nor'easter. The transfer was complete by mid-morning, and intense banding began to overspread New England as the nor'easter's central pressure dipped below 1000 mbar (29.53 inHg). A stationary 1027 mbar (30.33 inHg) area of high pressure over southern Labrador funneled cold air into the Northeast, allowing precipitation to slowly change over to snow along the spine of Vermont, in the White Mountains of New Hampshire, and on some summits in Maine in the afternoon. By the next morning, flurries were falling as low as 2,000 feet in elevation, highly uncommon this late in the season. Very heavy rain fell further south in areas of mesoscale banding, mainly in southeastern New England, with 5–7 in (130–180 mm) reported in many locales.

In the meantime, the nor'easter continued to intensify over the Atlantic Ocean, with frequent lightning strikes visible just north of its center on satellite late on May 22. Between 03:00 UTC and 06:00 UTC on May 23, the system made two landfalls in quick succession, first on Nantucket and then near Chatham, Massachusetts, with a central pressure of 996 mbar (29.41 inHg). Three hours later, the nor'easter reached its peak intensity with a minimum central pressure of 995 mbar (29.38 inHg) just off the Massachusetts coast, before beginning to accelerate northeastwards into the Gulf of Maine. Wind gusts as high as 65–70 mph (105–113 km/h) were observed in southeastern Massachusetts at this time, and sustained winds were estimated at 45 mph (75 km/h). The nor'easter steadily weakened through the rest of the day, before making a third and final landfall in far northeastern Maine at 00:00 UTC on May 24 with a central pressure of 1004 mbar (29.65 inHg). Precipitation overspread much of southeastern Quebec, New Brunswick, Nova Scotia, and Newfoundland as the system weakened inland on May 24, continuing even after the low dissipated late in the day. By this point, the Canadian high had exited to sea, but enough cold air remained in place in the Maritimes for precipitation to fall as snow in the mountains of the Gaspé Peninsula, northern New Brunswick, and eastern Newfoundland. Further south, 20–30 mm (0.79–1.18 in) of rain fell in Nova Scotia.

== Preparations and impact ==
=== Northeastern United States ===
Radar loop of rainbands in the tri-state area and southern New England with the nor'easter

Coastal flood advisories and gale warnings were issued for much of the New York and New England coastline ahead of the storm, and wind advisories went up in Downeast Maine. Freshwater flooding impacted eastern Massachusetts on May 22 and 23, particularly on the South Shore and Cape Cod, where rainfall totals far exceeded forecasts in many locations. Interstate 95 southbound flooded near Exit 44 in Waltham during the storm. One motorist in Chelsea was stranded in 2 ft (61 cm) of water on Willow Street but was able to exit his vehicle before police arrived on the scene. More widespread flooding occurred on Cape Cod, where some motorists required rescue, though none suffered injury. Part of the MBTA Orange Line shut down for four hours on the evening of May 22 after Ruggles station flooded with rainwater. Meanwhile, over 60 flights were cancelled at Logan International Airport and 300 others were delayed, and ferry service was interrupted to Block Island, Martha's Vineyard, and Nantucket. Over 15,000 customers lost power on Cape Cod as the nor'easter made its way onshore overnight on May 22, including 46% of Bourne and 44% of Orleans. Another 11,500 customers lost power on Martha's Vineyard after a lightning strike, though it was restored to most in under ten minutes. Over 5,000 others lost power in Connecticut. Downed trees and powerlines caused damage and additional power outages in eastern Massachusetts.

Unseasonably cold air accompanied the nor'easter, and multiple locations in the Northeast set record cold daily high temperatures on May 22. Concord, New Hampshire topped out at 47 °F (8 °C), breaking the previous record, set in 1939, by 4 °F (2 °C). Records set in 2005 were broken in Manchester, Portsmouth, and Lebanon. Portland, Maine broke its previous record of 50 °F (10 °C) by 1 °F (1 °C). Bridgeport, Connecticut's high of 52 °F (11 °C) was also a daily record, while Hartford's 49 °F (9 °C) was its lowest since 1909. Boston, Massachusetts's 48 °F (9 °C) was its lowest since the early 1900s as well. Further south, Central Park broke its previous record of 54 °F (12 °C), set in 1894. Its high temperature of 51 °F (11 °C) was lower than the average low temperature for May 22 by 6 °F (3 °C). Newark Liberty International Airport, LaGuardia Airport, and Islip, New York all broke daily high temperature records at 53 °F (12 °C), while John F. Kennedy International Airport tied its record of 55 °F (13 °C).

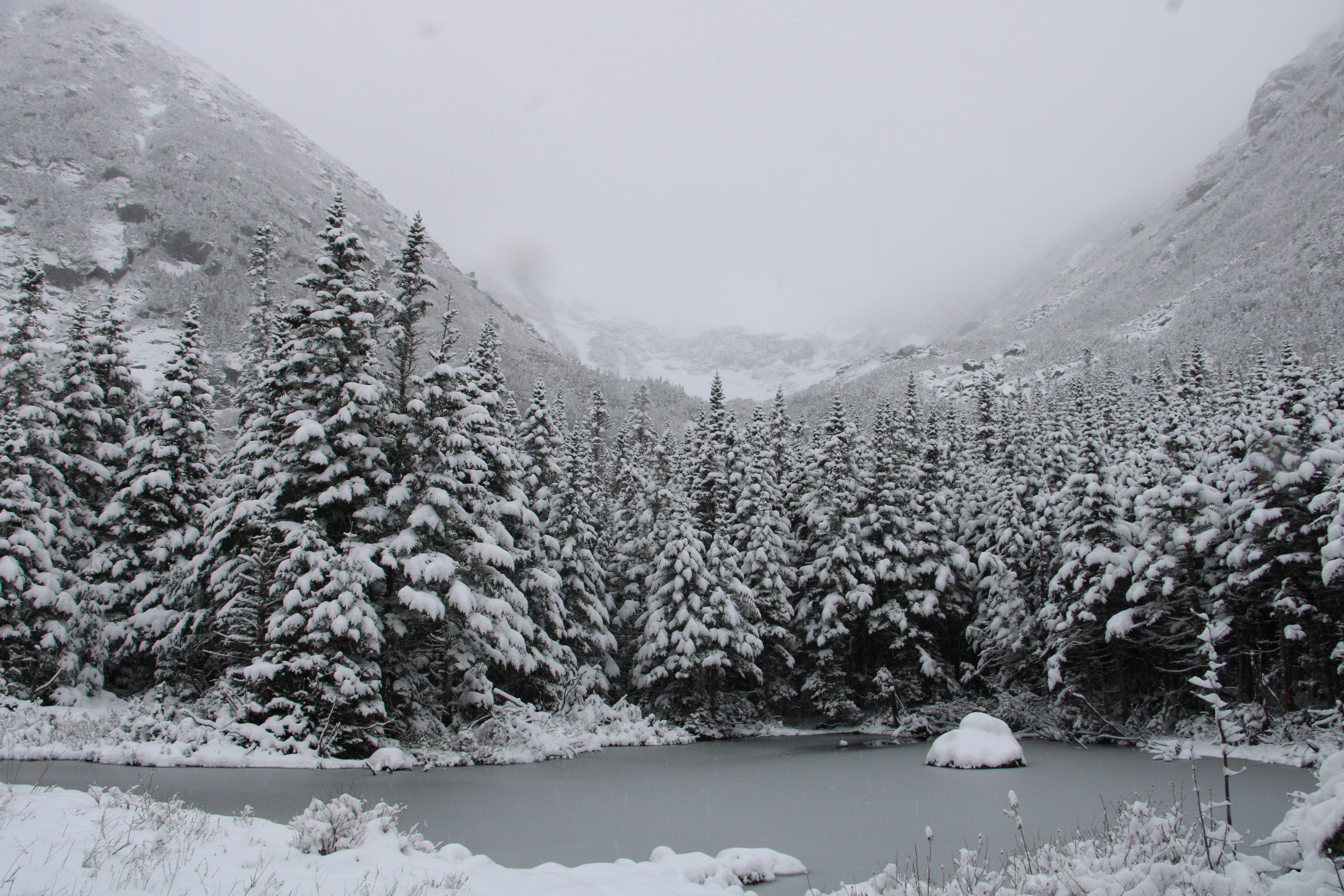
Snowfall accumulation at Hermit Lake in New Hampshire during the storm

Further north, significant snow fell in the mountains of Vermont and New Hampshire. The Mount Washington Auto Road was closed for most of the Memorial Day weekend as 7 ft (2.1 m) drifts buried sections of the road above 5,800 feet (1,800 m), and snow groomers, which are normally used to clear the road at the end of winter, were brought back out of summit storage to speed up the process. The road opened midday on May 26. Full winter conditions returned to trails above 3,500 feet (1,100 m) in the aftermath of the storm, and officials warned that layers and traction devices such as microspikes and crampons would be necessary for those hiking during the long weekend. While there are no weather stations on Mount Katahdin, the highest mountain in Maine is also estimated to have received "significant snow" during the nor'easter by the National Weather Service. Trail conditions remained treacherous for several days after the storm's passage, particularly above treeline. Two hikers were killed in these conditions after summiting the mountain on June 1, one to blunt force trauma after slipping on lingering snow and ice and the other to hypothermia.

=== Atlantic Canada ===
The nor'easter had weakened considerably by the time it reached Atlantic Canada, and impacts there were not as significant. Still, wind warnings were issued for the Nova Scotia coastline in advance of the storm, with gusts up to 70 km/h (43 mph) anticipated. Cape Breton Island, which is particularly prone to high winds due to its terrain, saw gusts as high as 100 km/h (62 mph). In New Brunswick, the cities of Bathurst and Moncton observed their lowest late May high temperatures in nearly a decade on May 23. Further east, the Avalon Peninsula of Newfoundland received 10–20 mm (0.39–0.79 in) of rain, while mountainous parts of the province observed accumulating snow, as did the Gaspé Peninsula and northern New Brunswick.

== See also ==
- Tornado outbreak of May 18–21, 2025
- April 2007 nor'easter
- October 2017 nor'easter
- Early May 2020 North American cold wave
- December 15–17, 2020 nor'easter
- April 2021 nor'easter
