= 2024–25 North American winter =

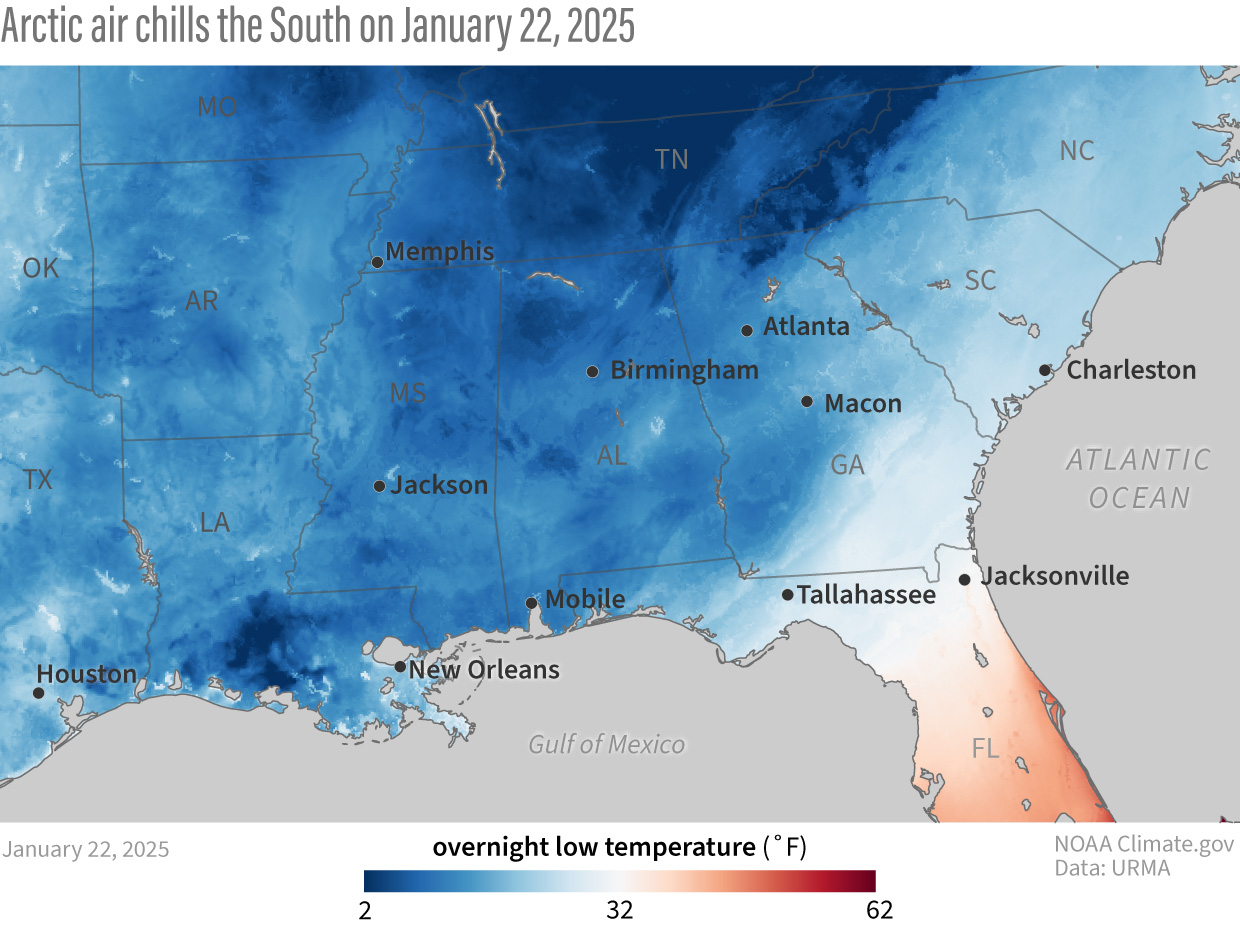
- Map of the very cold overnight temperatures in the Southern United States on January 22, 2025, in the aftermath of a historic Gulf Coast blizzard.

Seasonal boundaries
- Meteorological winter: December 1 – February 28
- Astronomical winter: December 21 – March 20
- First event started: November 7, 2024
- Last event concluded: May 24, 2025

Most notable event
- Name: 2025 Gulf Coast blizzard
  - Duration: January 20–22, 2025
  - Lowest pressure: 939 mb (27.73 inHg)
  - Fatalities: 13 fatalities
  - Damage: $200 million (2025 USD)

Seasonal statistics
- Total WPC-issued storms: 21 total
- Rated storms (RSI) (Cat. 1+): 6 total
- Major storms (RSI) (Cat. 3+): 0 total
- Maximum snowfall accumulation: 65.5 in (166 cm) in Pinckney, New York (November 28–December 3, 2024)
- Maximum ice accretion: 1.5 in (38 mm) in Elmira, Michigan (March 28–30, 2025)
- Total fatalities: 55 total
- Total damage: > $3.385 billion (2025 USD)

Related articles
- Asian winter, European windstorm season

The 2024–25 North American winter was considerably colder and much more wintry across the North American continent, particularly in the eastern half of the United States, than the previous winter season. The Weather Prediction Center (WPC) tracked a total of 21 significant winter storms during the winter. The season, marked by persistent rounds of very cold temperatures and impactful winter weather events, started with a powerful bomb cyclone that impacted the West Coast of the United States in mid-to-late November, and a severe lake-effect snowstorm in the Great Lakes later that month. However, the most significant and widespread event of the season was a historic blizzard that struck the Gulf Coast of the United States in late January, in tandem with a severe cold wave that also brought extremely cold temperatures to the majority of the continent throughout much of January, the coldest such January in many years. These two events combined served to be one of the deadliest and costliest events of the season. Six storms were rated on the Regional Snowfall Index (RSI); though similar to the previous winter, none were rated above a Category 3 "Major" event.

Other significant winter events, some ranked on the RSI, also occurred throughout the season, including a wide-ranging Category 2 blizzard that affected much of the central parts of the United States in early January, followed by a another Category 2 winter storm that brought snow and ice to the South, a quick-moving nor'easter that affected much of the Northeastern United States. A pattern change in February brought a series of winter storms and cold temperatures to the eastern half of the U.S., before abruptly ending at the end of the month. A weak La Niña was expected to influence the weather patterns across the North American continent this winter. Collectively, the winter weather events resulted in 55 deaths and at least US$3.38 billion (2025 USD) in damages.

While there is no well-agreed-upon date used to indicate the start of winter in the Northern Hemisphere, there are two definitions of winter which may be used. Based on the astronomical definition, winter begins at the winter solstice, which in 2024 occurred on December 21, and ends at the March equinox, which in 2025 occurred on March 20. Based on the meteorological definition, the first day of winter is December 1 and the last day February 28. Both definitions involve a period of approximately three months, with some variability. Winter is often defined by meteorologists to be the three calendar months with the lowest average temperatures. Since both definitions span the calendar year, it is possible to have a winter storm spanning two different years.

== Seasonal forecasts ==
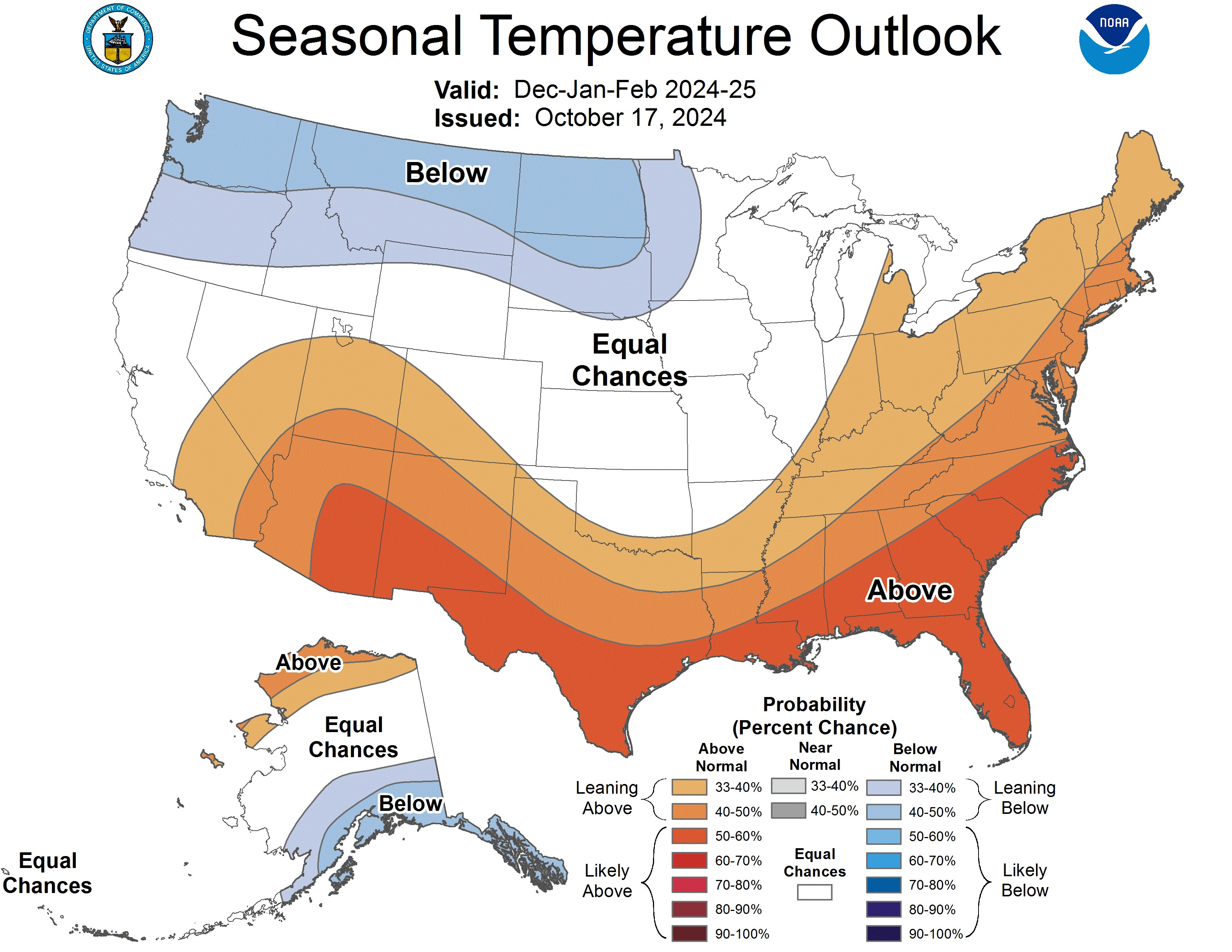
Temperature outlook in the United States

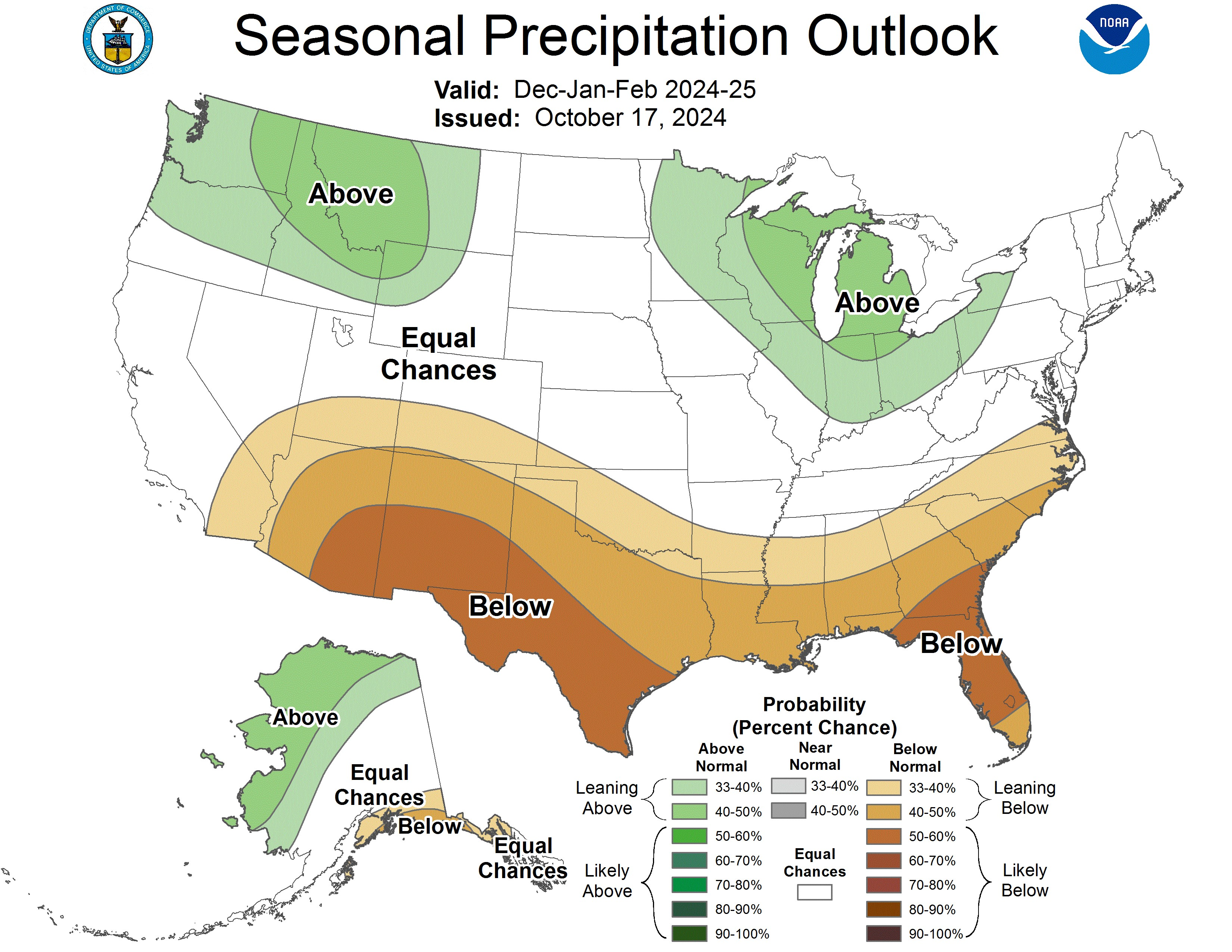
Precipitation outlook in the United States

On October 19, 2024, the National Oceanic and Atmospheric Administration's Climate Prediction Center released its U.S. Winter Outlook. The temperature and precipitation outlooks reflected the likelihood of a weak La Niña pattern that would continue during most of the winter. The forecast called for warmer than average temperatures across much of the southern United States in addition to the East Coast, as well as the Gulf Coast, with colder than average temperatures in the Northwestern United States. The forecast also called for drier than average conditions across the southern United States, and wetter than average conditions in the northwest and central United States – despite some regions of the South receiving heavy rainfall during the 2024 Atlantic hurricane season.

On December 4, 2024, Environment Canada released its winter outlook for December, January and February as part of their monthly climate outlooks. The agency predicted near to above average temperatures across most of Canada; particularly in the northern and eastern regions of Canada. Western regions of Canada were expected to have warmer conditions at the start of winter, before eventually trending to more cooler temperatures throughout the remainder of the winter season.

== Seasonal summary ==
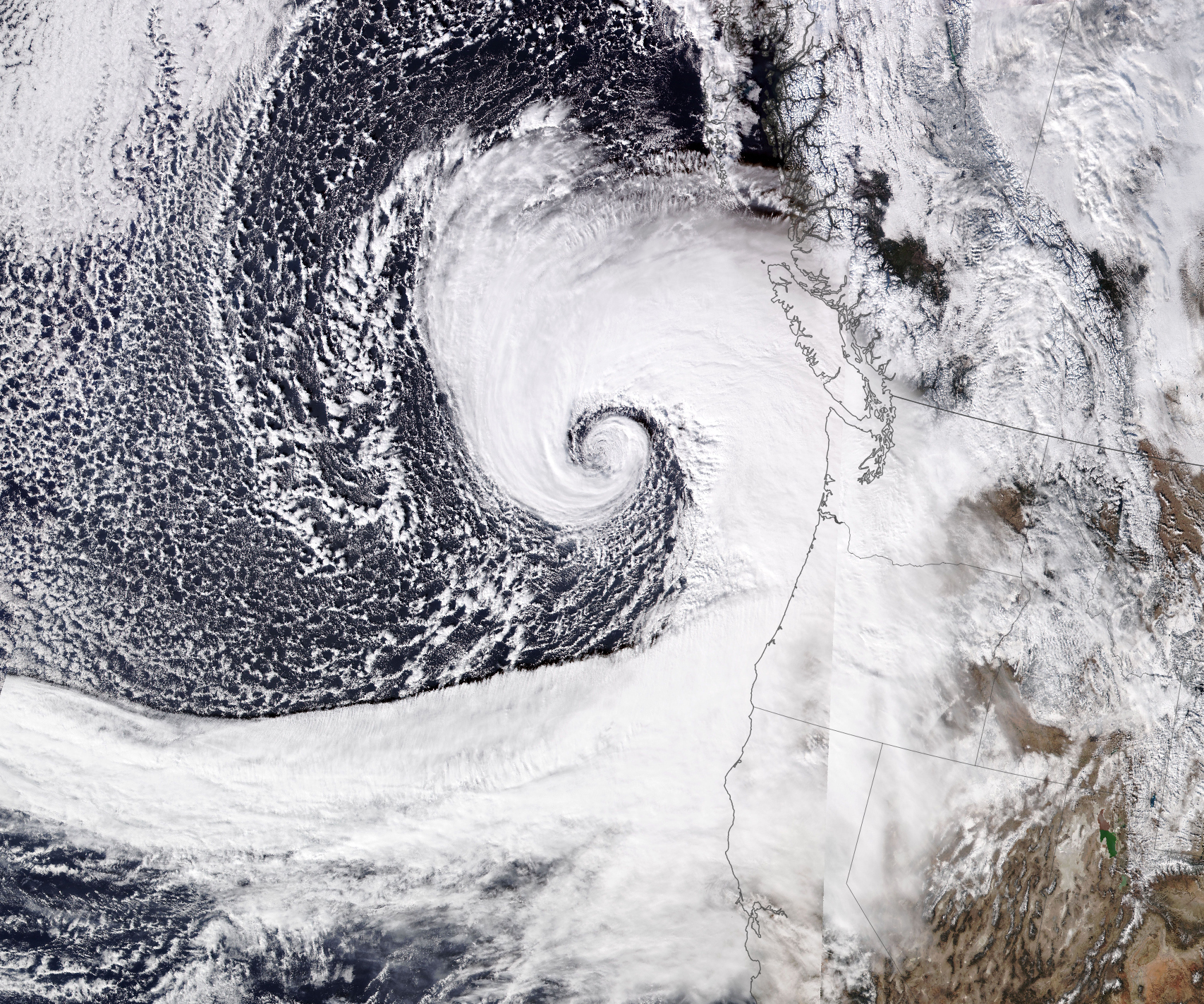
A bomb cyclone off the Pacific Northwest coast on the afternoon of November 19, 2024

The 2024–25 winter season opened with a significant blizzard affecting the Rocky Mountains in early November, described by the Weather Prediction Center (WPC) as historic, with up to 3 feet (36 in; 91 cm). Two weeks later on November 19, an extremely strong bomb cyclone struck the Pacific Northwest, bringing record-low pressure readings for that region and knocking out power to over 900,000, killing 4 people. Beginning in the first few days of December, several periods of widespread below-average temperatures moved throughout the North American continent, affecting over 200 million people in the United States and Canada, in what was the coldest start to meteorological winter for many in several years. Temperatures ranged from 10–20 °F (5.6–11.1 °C) below average across the Northeastern United States, with places like New York City having temperatures at 40 °F (4 °C) the first five days of the month, which was the coldest such period since 2019. Additionally, the first cold snap influenced a severe lake-effect snow event in the Great Lakes mentioned previously, as well as bringing colder temperatures to parts of Canada. This pattern was soon replaced by a brief warm-up, before colder temperatures briefly returned by mid-month, with wind chills reaching as Iow as −40 °C (−40 °F) in the Dakotas and single-digit temperatures in Chicago, Illinois, on the morning of December 11 followed by another brief warm-up period. Another large spread of below-average temperatures encompassed the Northeast just as the winter solstice began on December 21, with wind chills reaching as low as −10 °F (−23 °C) in some areas.

== Events ==
There were several winter weather events during the 2024–25 North American winter. Significant events include cold waves, snowstorms, and other notable events outside the conventional limits of winter.

=== Early November blizzard ===
- Category 0 "Nuisance" (RSI/NOAA: N/A)
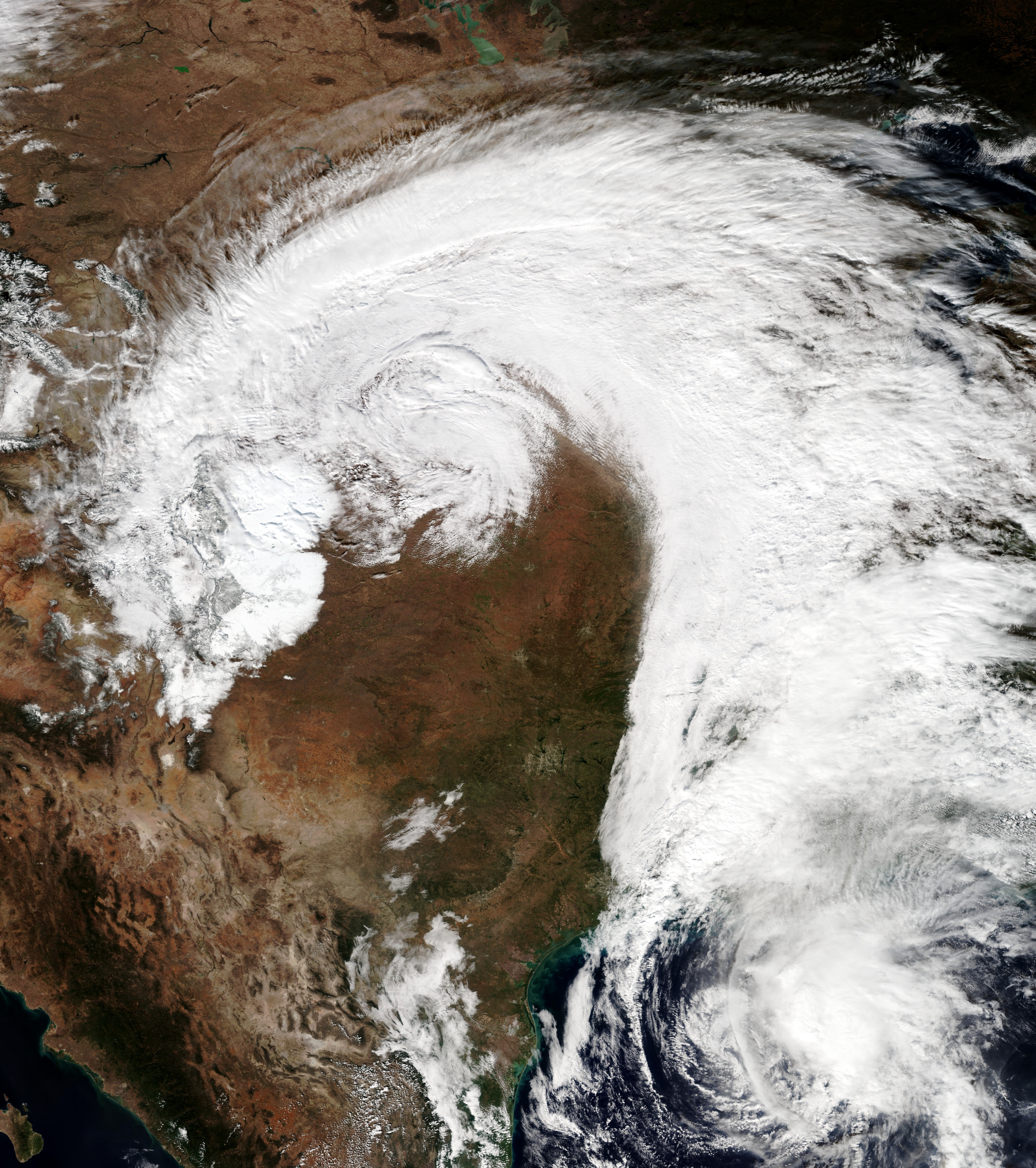
- Duration: November 7 – November 9, 2024
- Maximum snow: 40.7 in (103 cm)

A historic blizzard, unofficially named Winter Storm Anya by The Weather Channel, affected the Southern Rocky Mountains and adjacent High Plains starting on November 6, producing blizzard conditions across a large portion of the region. At least 40.7 inches (103 cm) of snow fell in Colorado, at least 27.31 inches (69.4 cm) in New Mexico, 6 inches (15 cm) in Nebraska, 4 inches (10 cm) in Oklahoma, and 3.3 inches (8.4 cm) in Kansas. In the early hours of November 7, the Weather Prediction Center, noted a large area of "extreme and widespread disruptions" was expected in parts of Colorado and New Mexico. Over 52,000 customers lost power in New Mexico during the storms.

The system also drew strength from a stalled front over the Southern U.S. and tropical moisture it absorbed from the weakening Tropical Storm Rafael to its south causing significant flooding in Georgia and South Carolina, with 12 inches of rain falling in less than 24 hours. In the latter, two people were killed as a result, though these do not count towards the blizzard’s death count.

=== November West Coast bomb cyclone ===
- Category 0 "Nuisance" (RSI/NOAA: N/A)
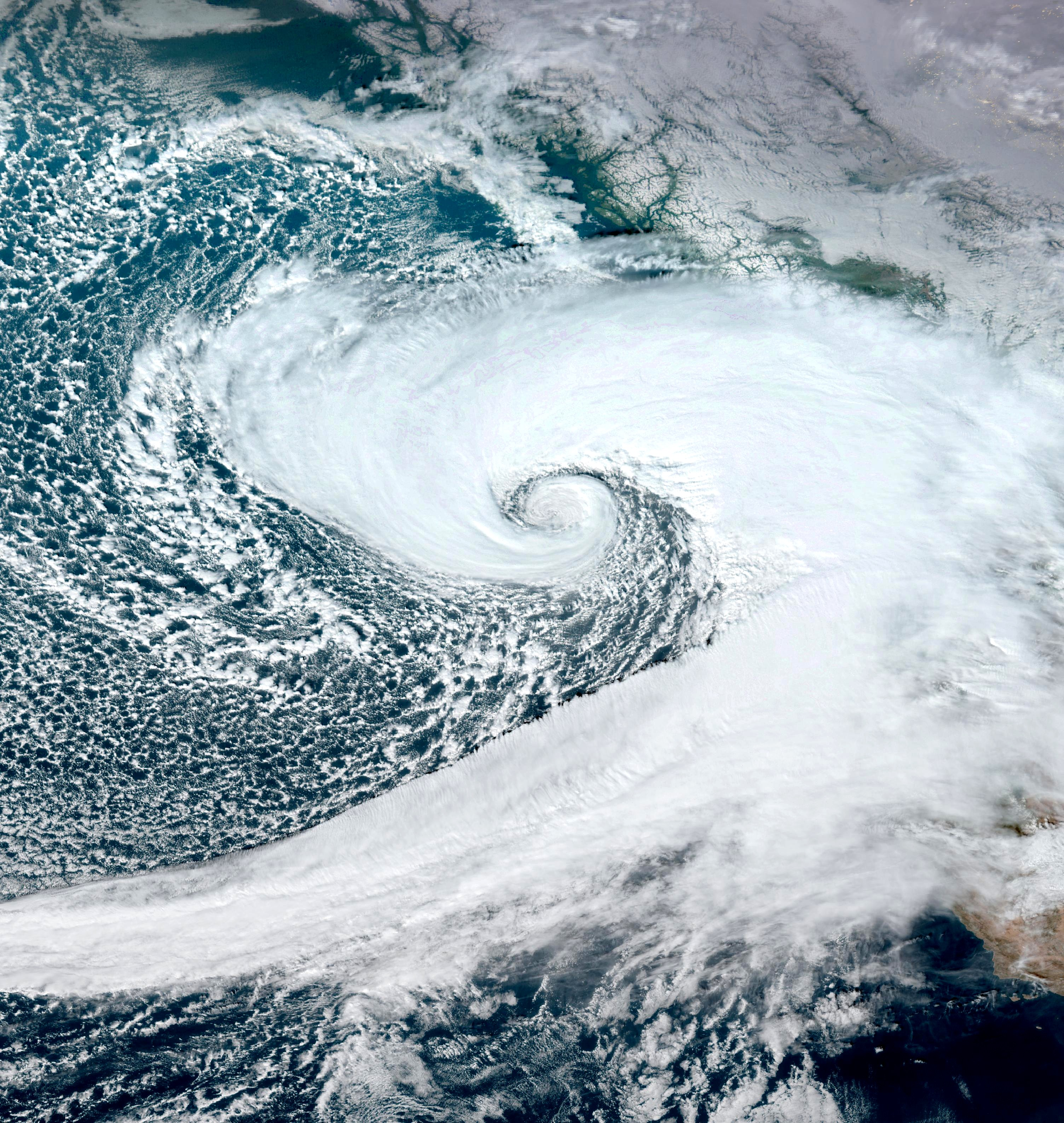
- Duration: November 19 – November 21, 2024
- Lowest pressure: 942 mb (27.82 inHg)
- Maximum snow: 20 in (51 cm)
- Fatalities: 4 fatalities

A very strong bomb cyclone struck the Pacific Northwest on November 19, resulting in the death of four people and 953,000 without electric power. The storm underwent bombogenesis, rapidly dropping its central pressure to a record-tying level of 942 millibars (27.8 inHg). The storm was associated with an atmospheric river that dropped large amounts of rain in Oregon and California.

The Storm Prediction Center (SPC) issued a rare high risk of excessive rainfall in parts of Northern California, warning of "life-threatening flooding". In British Columbia, Canada, over 270,000 customers of BC Hydro were left without power. Highways 4, 14, 18, and 28—all on Vancouver Island—were closed due to debris and downed power lines. On Sartine Island, a gust of 159 kilometres per hour (99 mph) was reported. Interstate 5 was closed due to heavy snow near the Oregon and California border. In California, some areas received up to ≥20 inches (508 millimeters) of rain.

=== Late November–early December lake-effect snow ===
Lake effect snow impacted portions of northeastern Ohio and Pennsylvania near Lake Erie, leaving accumulations of 2–5 ft (61–152 cm). In preparation of the storm, Interstate 90 shut down over 80 mi (130 km) of highway. Snow also resulted in portions of Interstate 94 and Pennsylvania State Route 5 closing. Snowfall totals reached 65.5 in (166 cm) in Pinckney, New York. In Erie, Pennsylvania, an all time single day snowfall record was set at 22.6 in (57 cm) with a total of 42.5 in (108 cm) of snowfall. Areas slightly further north in Ontario also were severely affected, with 100 cm (39 in) of snow being reported in Echo Bay and 73–82 cm (29–32 in) in Sault Ste. Marie. Within Ontario, many collisions and accidents were reported on major highways in the Muskoska region.

The winter storm resulted in two fatalities in Upstate New York, as well as 14,000 power outages in the state of Pennsylvania.

=== Pre-Christmas Northeast U.S. winter storm ===
- Category 0 "Nuisance" (RSI/NOAA: N/A)
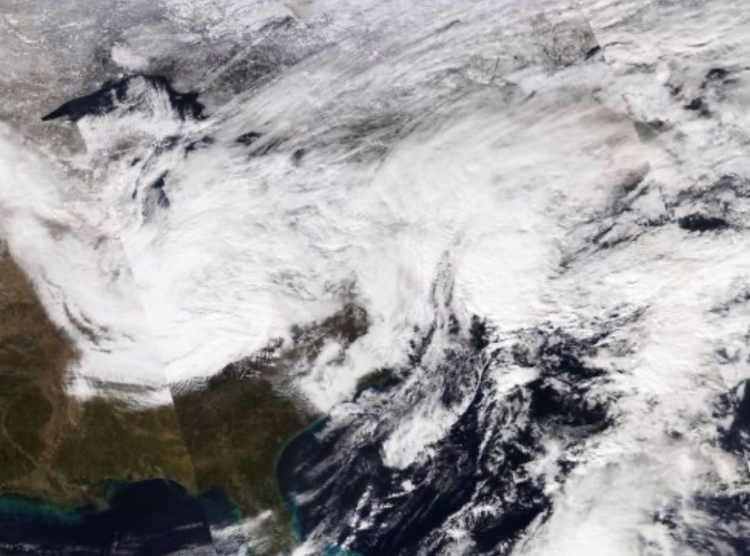
- Duration: December 19 – December 22, 2024
- Maximum snow: 9 in (23 cm)

At the start of the winter solstice on December 20–21, a developing winter storm off the coast of the United States ended up bringing the first accumulating snowfall to many regions of the Northeast and parts of New England as well. The system developed from an Alberta clipper that moved through the Upper Midwest which dropped 3–6 in (7.6–15.2 cm) to a majority of the region, before weakening and merging with a developing coastal low before spreading accumulating snow across the Northeast corridor.

Chicago O'Hare International Airport issued a ground stop in response to the winter weather on December 20, and the airport recorded 2.1 in (5.3 cm), with up to 5 in (13 cm) in parts of the state and up to 9 in (23 cm) fell in Wisconsin. In the Northeast, Central Park in New York City recorded 1.8 in (4.6 cm) of snow, which was their first December snowfall since 2021, and the first over an inch since a nor'easter in 2020. Both LaGuardia Airport at 2.8 in (7.1 cm) of snow and Islip at 2 in (5.1 cm) of snow set daily snowfall records. In New Jersey, close to 5 in (13 cm) fell in the northern and northwestern portions of the state. A ground stop was briefly issued at Newark Liberty International Airport. Further northeast, heavier snow of 6–9 in (15–23 cm) fell in and around Boston, Massachusetts, where several car crashes were reported, road closures occurred and Logan International Airport, which received 5.3 in (13 cm), canceled or delayed dozens of flights in and out of the airport. It was the heaviest snowfall in the city since a blizzard in 2022.

=== Early January blizzard ===
- Category 2 "Significant" (RSI/NOAA: 3.02)
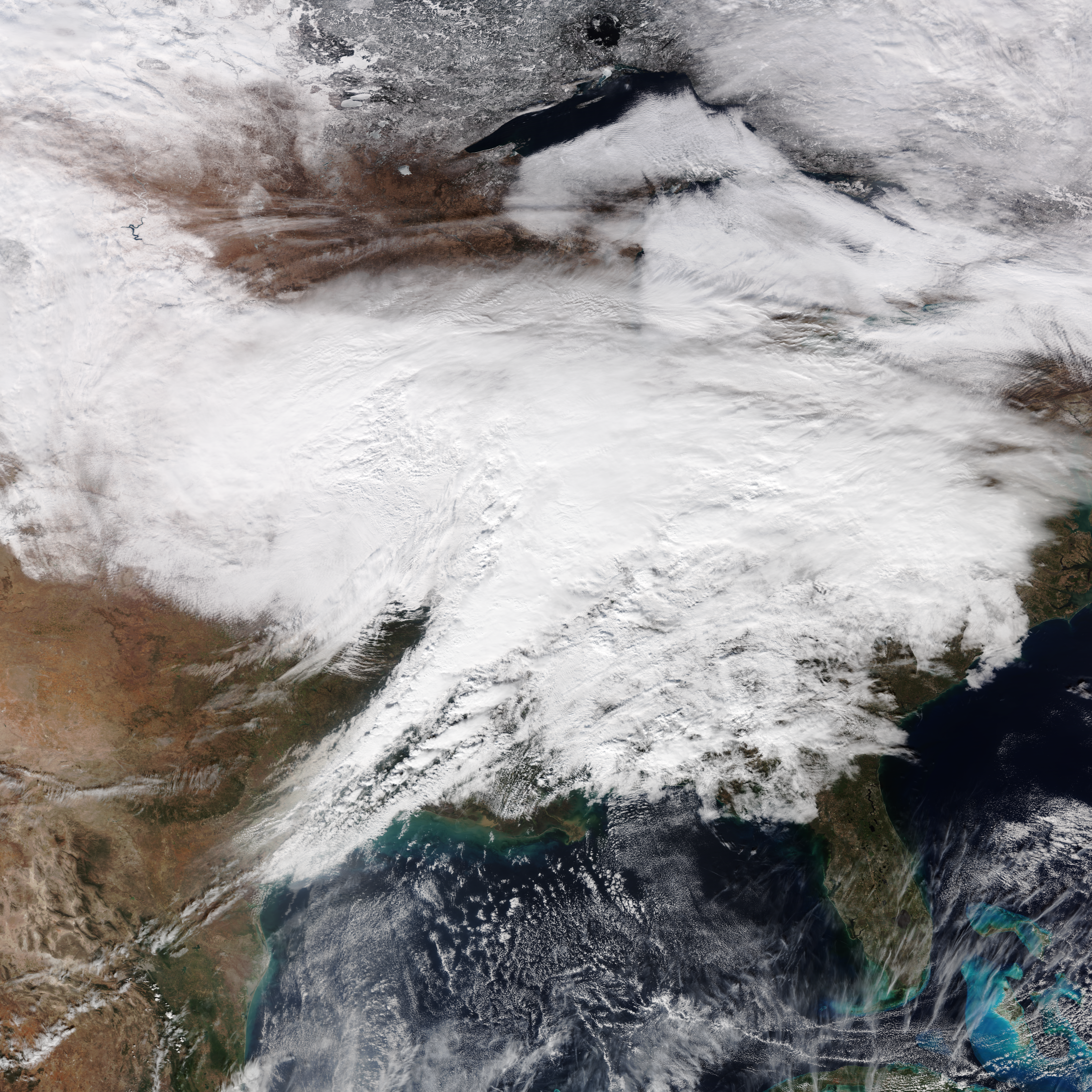
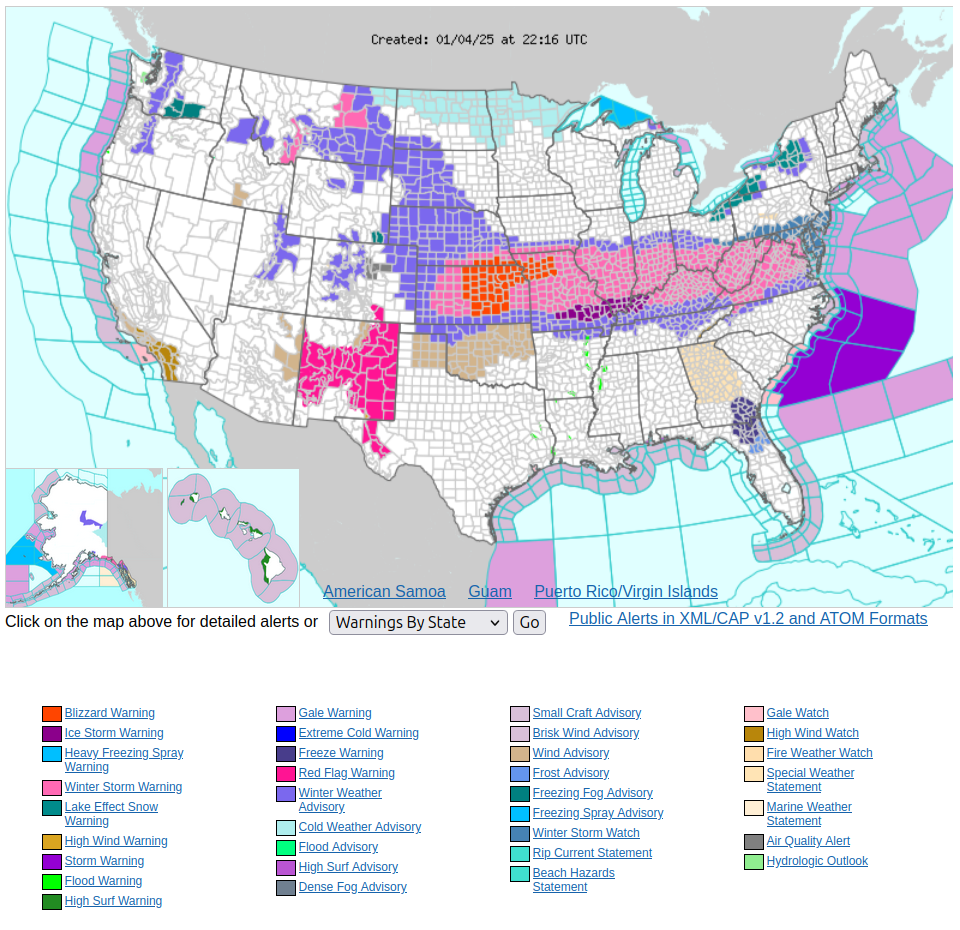
- Duration: January 3 – January 7, 2025
- Lowest pressure: 980 mb (28.94 inHg)
- Maximum snow: 20.5 in (52 cm)
- Fatalities: 7 fatalities
- Damage: $100 million (2025 USD)

A large-scale winter storm and blizzard began affecting the central U.S. in early January. On January 4, the interaction of the remnants from an extratropical cyclone that moved ashore the Pacific Northwest the previous day and the mountainous terrain of the Rocky Mountains led to the formation of a surface area of low pressure near the New Mexico–Texas border. Atmospheric convection generated by the system over cold air already in place led to wintry precipitation developing across parts of the High Plains later that night and into the early morning of January 5.

Across 27 states within the continental United States, approximately 60 million people across a 2,100 mi (3,400 km)-long path were put under various advisories, watches and warnings, including blizzard warnings, ice storm warnings and winter storm watches and warnings. In the city of Wichita and the surrounding regions, freezing rain led to icy conditions, causing accidents and slideoffs to occur on US 54.

=== January cold wave ===
Throughout the majority of January, a prolonged cold wave impacted most of the U.S. and parts of Canada, due to the breakdown of the polar vortex. On January 3, Saskatoon and Regina, Saskatchewan both recorded temperatures as low as −30 °C (−22 °F). On January 22, Kansas City, Kansas set a new daily record low of −8 °F (−22.2 °C), and Pueblo, Colorado set a new daily low of −19 °F (−28.3 °C).

Beaumont, Texas set an all time monthly record low of 11 °F (−11.7 °C) for January. New record low temperatures were set in Jennings, Louisiana, New Roads, Lafayette, New Iberia at 7 °F (−13.9 °C), 4 °F (−15.6 °C), 4 °F (−15.6 °C) and 2 °F (−16.7 °C) respectively. Baton Rouge and Lake Charles also set a monthly all time record low of 7 °F (−13.9 °C) and 6 °F (−14.4 °C) for January respectively.

Due to the freezing temperatures, U.S. president-elect Donald Trump announced on January 17 that his second inauguration ceremony would be moved indoors as a result, and would take place in the Capitol rotunda. This was the first time this occurred since the public second inauguration of Ronald Reagan on January 21, 1985.

=== Mid-January winter storm ===
- Category 2 "Significant" (RSI/NOAA: 4.13)
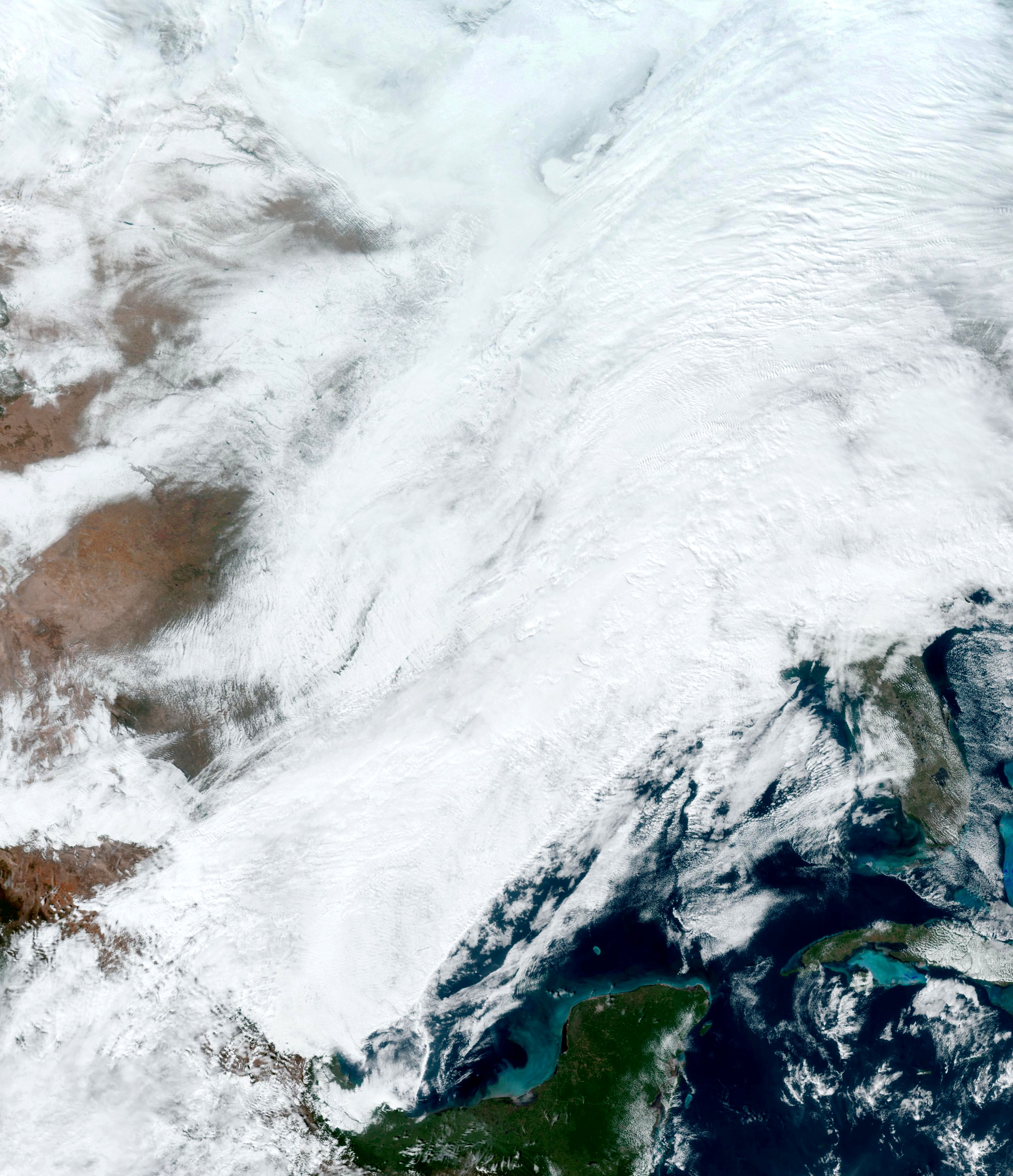
- Duration: January 8 – January 11, 2025
- Lowest pressure: 967 mb (28.56 inHg)
- Maximum snow: 14.3 in (36 cm)
- Fatalities: 1 fatalities
- Damage: $115 million (2025 USD)

A major winter storm began impacting the Deep South on January 8–10. Up to 14.3 in (36 cm) of snow fell in Mena, Arkansas, with 2.2 in (5.6 cm) of snow in Dallas, 3.5 in (8.9 cm) of snow in Oklahoma City and 2.1 in (5.3 cm) of snow in Atlanta, the largest snowstorm in years for these cities. Charlotte also reported 0.4 in (1.0 cm) of snow, breaking the longest snowless streak on record for the city. During the storm, a ground stop was issued at Hartsfield-Jackson International Airport, with over half of flights cancelled; significant cancellations also occurred at Dallas-Fort Worth International Airport and Charlotte Douglas International Airport. With over 3,000 flights cancelled, it represented the most significant daily delays since July. Four people were indirectly injured in the storm in Atlanta when a flight bound for Minneapolis aborted takeoff due to an engine failure. A basketball game hosted by the Atlanta Hawks was postponed due to the storm.

Approximately 80 million people were estimated to be impacted by the winter storm, with state of emergencies declared across several states in advance of the storm. Cities that rarely see much snowfall at all, such as Atlanta, Georgia, received accumulating snow in addition to other wintry precipitation, leading to very hazardous conditions and numerous flight delays as well as travel-related accidents. More than 120,000 people are estimated to have lost power as a result of the storm, the majority of which came from the state of Georgia near the city of Atlanta which suffered major impacts and the worst storm there since the 2014 winter storm. With over 3,000 flights cancelled, the winter storm was responsible for the most significant daily delays since July 2024.

=== Late January nor'easter ===
- Category 0 "Nuisance" (RSI/NOAA: N/A)
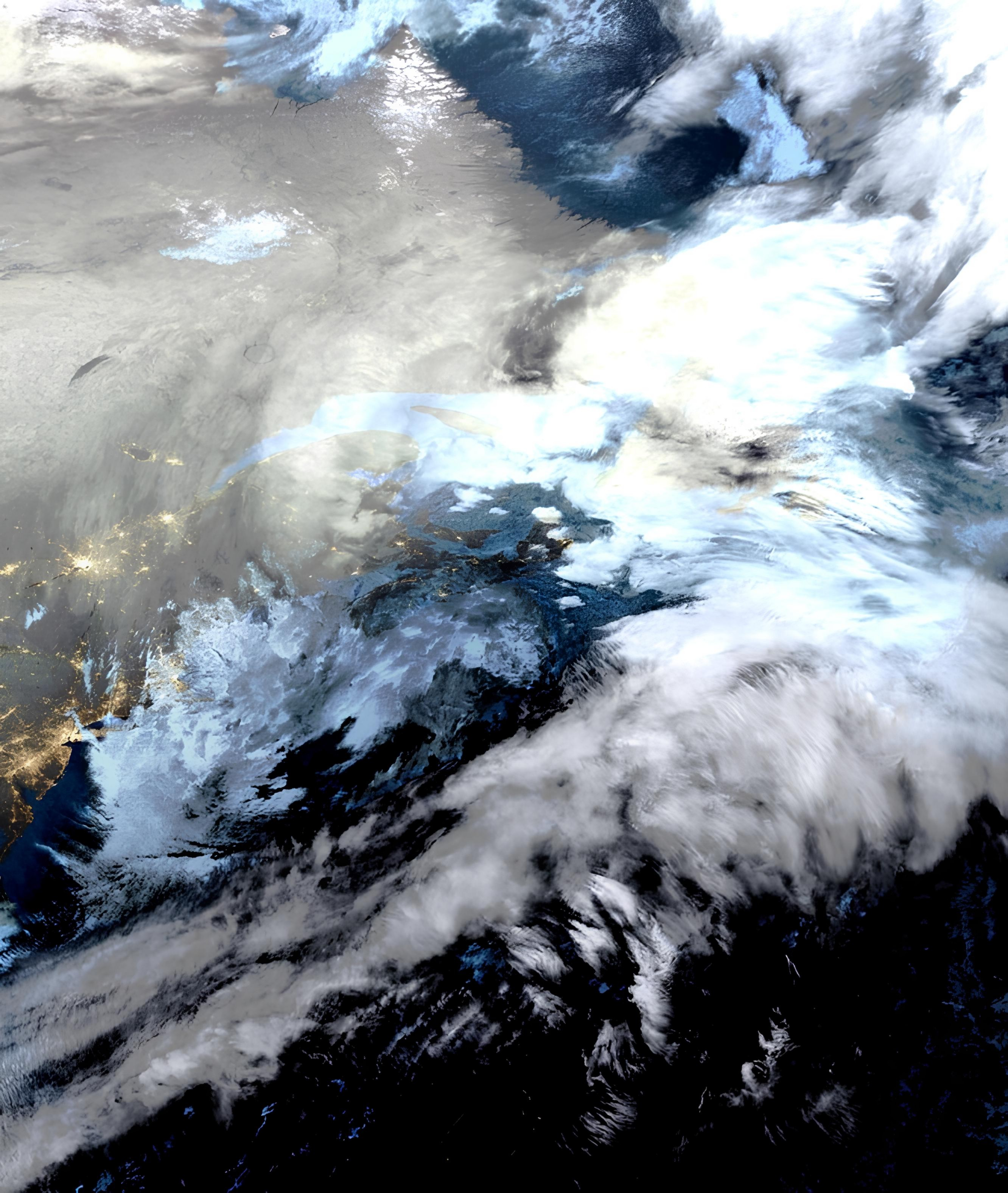
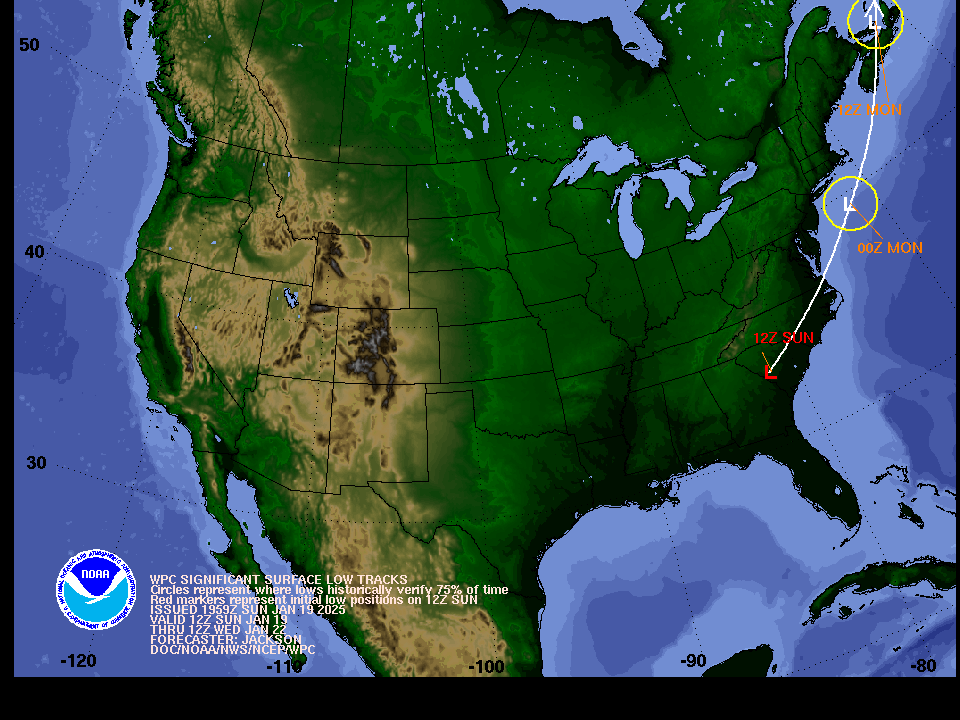
- Duration: January 18 – January 20, 2025
- Lowest pressure: 960 mb (28.35 inHg)
- Maximum snow: 16 in (41 cm)

On January 19, behind an arctic front that swept through the Northeastern United States, a weak surface low developed near the Georgia–South Carolina border. Throughout the day, precipitation blossomed across the Mid-Atlantic states as the system moved offshore into the Atlantic Ocean. By 03:00 UTC on January 20, the Weather Prediction Center (WPC) issued its first storm summary bulletin on the developing nor'easter. Because of its speed, the system's extent moved through the Northeast fast, which limited the extent of snow accumulation. As a result, snow from the nor'easter tapered off west to east, and by 12:00 UTC that day, the system was already located near Atlantic Canada. Three hours later, after the system had completely exited the U.S., the WPC issued its second and final storm summary bulletin on the storm.

New Jersey Governor Phil Murphy declared a state of emergency on January 18 for the entire state in advance of the nor'easter. The New Jersey Department of Transportation (NJDOT) issued a vehicle restriction on both lanes across most of the major roadways and interstates in the state, which included I-287, I-76, I-195, I-80, I-280, I-295 and I-676. A parking advisory was issued, and the New Jersey Department of Safety said it would respond to any incidents of burglary or other weather-related incidents during the storm. A snow alert was issued for New York City, expected to begin at 7 a.m. on January 19 at the onset of the storm. Plows and sanitation crews were prepared, with over 20 million pounds of salt ready for use on the roads. Alternate-side parking was suspended for the day of January 20, both due to the storm and also in observance of Martin Luther King Jr. Day. New York Governor Kathy Hochul said that residents further north from the city should also prepare. Additionally, at least 1,630 plow trucks were readied statewide. Several vehicles, including two tractor trailers were involved in a pileup on Interstate 80 in Pennsylvania in Clearfield County, Pennsylvania, with a state trooper's car also being involved in the wreck. At least one person was injured as a result. Within the state of New Jersey, thundersnow was officially reported within Essex County by the National Weather Service office in New York. Remarkably, no accidents occurred within the state, despite a majority of New Jersey receiving snow totals of 4–6 inches (10–15 cm), mainly in the northern half of the state. Near New York City, New York, a full ground delay program was enacted at the John F. Kennedy International Airport. Snowfall totals varied within the New York metropolitan area, due to precipitation mixing early on, with the highest being 8.1 in (21 cm) at Highland Mills. Comparetively, a total of only 1.6 in (4.1 cm) of snow had fallen at Central Park.

=== Late January U.S. Gulf Coast blizzard ===
- Category 1 "Notable" (RSI/NOAA: 2.937)
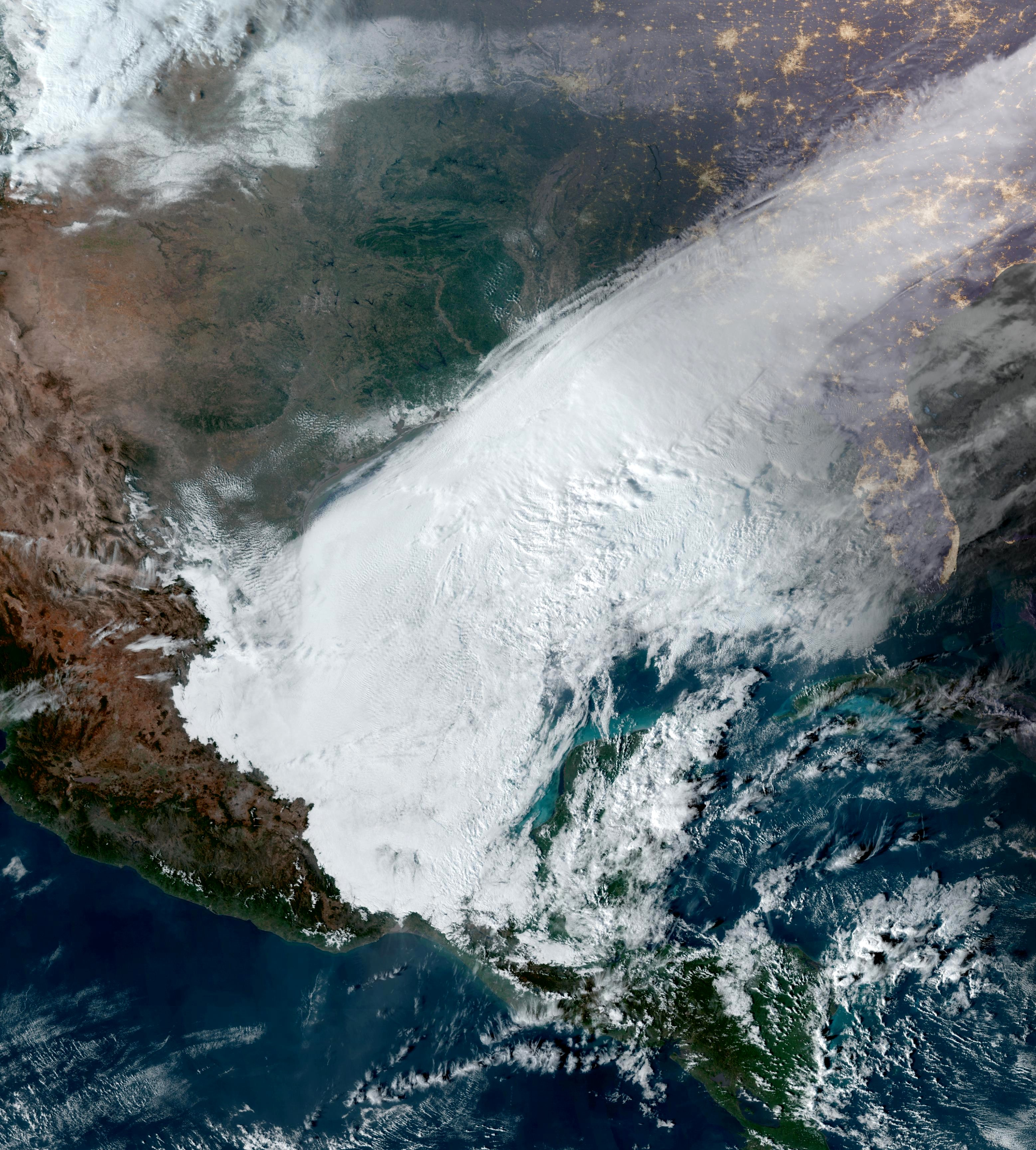
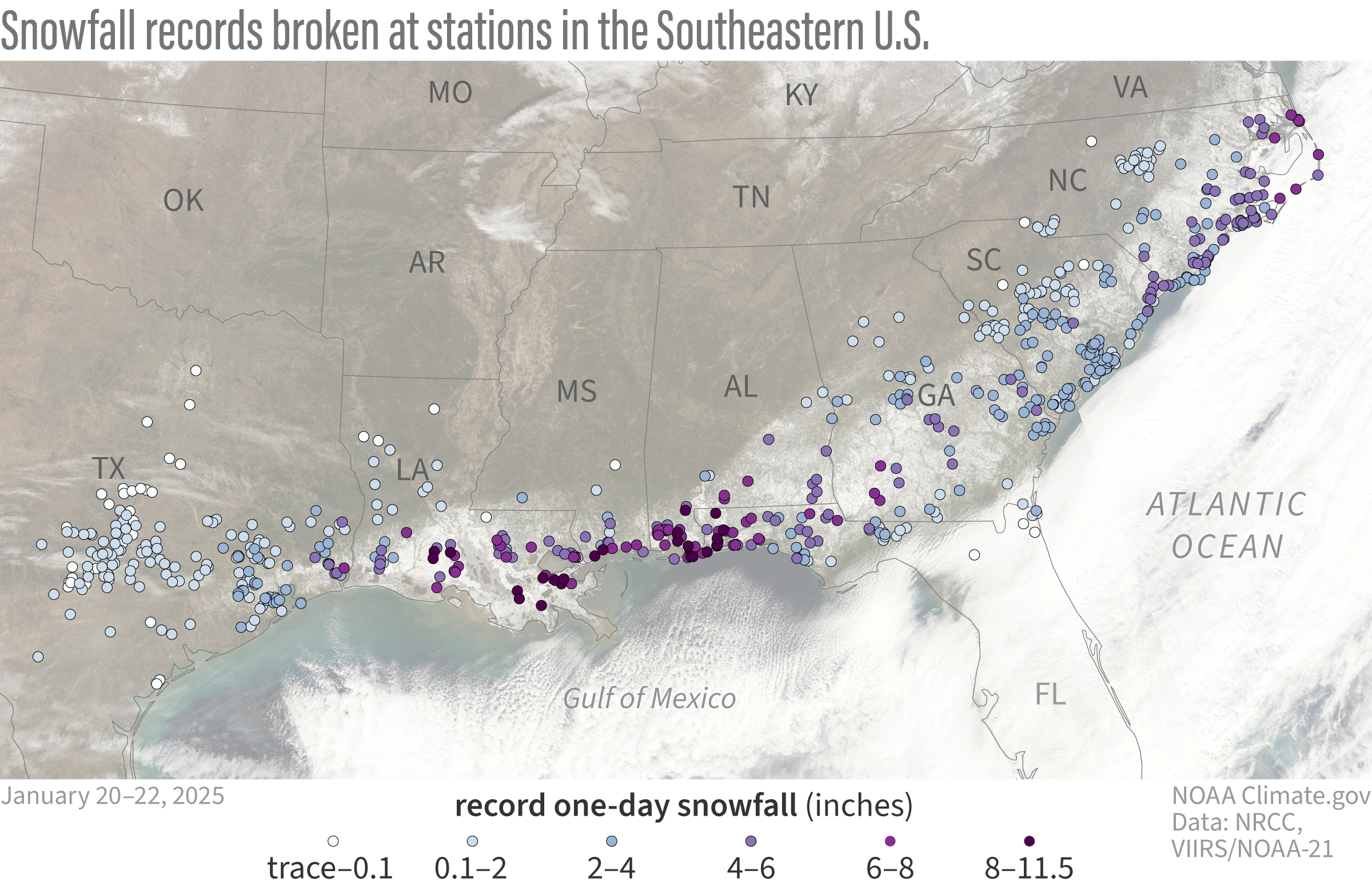
- Duration: January 20 – January 22, 2025
- Lowest pressure: 939 mb (27.73 inHg)
- Maximum snow: 13.4 in (34 cm)
- Fatalities: 10 fatalities
- Damage: $200 million (2025 USD)

On January 20, a rare and historic winter storm and blizzard began impacting the Gulf Coast of the United States. Early on January 21, a low pressure area was located in the western Gulf of Mexico, connected to a cold front. Fueled by an Arctic cold front moving through the southern United States, the low produced an area of snowfall, sleet, and freezing rain across the U.S. Gulf Coast from Texas to Florida. The Weather Prediction Center described it as an "impactful, rare winter storm". The remnants of the blizzard subsequently crossed the Atlantic Ocean and developed into Storm Éowyn, which brought historic impacts to Ireland, Isle of Man and the United Kingdom and mildly affected western Norway.

Ahead of the storm, state agencies in Texas mobilized resources in advance of the winter weather. Airports near Houston, Texas halted their flights on January 19 due to the storm. Starting on the evening of January 20 and continuing into January 21, freezing rain and snow took place in the Houston area, with up to 3 inches (7.6 cm) of snow falling near Liberty. As the system moved east, a blizzard warning was issued for southeastern Texas and southwestern Louisiana, the first on record for the latter state. Milton, Florida saw 10 in (25 cm) of snow, the most ever recorded in Florida history.

=== February winter storms & cold wave ===
An active weather pattern set up in the first two thirds of February, leading to multiple winter storms tracking across the northern half of the U.S. from California to much of the Northeastern United States, including the Mid-Atlantic states and New England. By February 21, all of the states in the continental United States had recorded at least 6 inches (15 cm) of seasonal snowfall, with the last time that occurred being during the 2009–10 North American winter.

Additionally, continued cold temperatures across the northern half of the United States eventually culminated with another blast of bitterly cold temperatures across a widespread portion of the Lower 48 by February 20 with an intensity not seen since the 2021 cold wave. On February 20, Oklahoma City, Oklahoma set a new daily record low of 4 °F (−16 °C). Bismarck, North Dakota reached a temperature of −39 °F (−39 °C) on February 18, marking their coldest temperature since January 2009 and very close to the all-time record there. The coldest temperature recorded during the arctic outbreak was −45 °F (−43 °C) in Antelope Creek and Hettinger on February 18 and 19, respectively. February 20 also saw cities such as Valentine, Nebraska, Kansas City also saw daily record lows with temperatures below 10 °F (−12 °C). Further east, the cold also set records on February 20, with Memphis, Tennessee recording a new daily record high of 23 °F (−5 °C). That same day, San Antonio, Texas also reached a daily record low of 21 °F (−6 °C). By the weekend of February 22, the persistent pattern causing the cold began to break down, paving the way for warmer temperatures to return.

==== First storm (February 4–6) ====
On February 2, an atmospheric river event began moving ashore on the West Coast of the United States, bringing very heavy rain and snowfall to several states there that previously experienced a dry January. Snowfall totals of up to 3 feet (36 in; 91 cm) were recorded in the Sierra Nevada Mountains, and gusty winds of up to 60–80 mph (97–129 km/h) were reported as well. One person was injured as a result of a tree falling down due to strong winds in San Francisco, California. The remaining energy from the system moved over the Midwest by February 5, contributing to an ice storm developing in the Ohio Valley. damages amounted to at least $160 million.

==== Second storm (February 6–9) ====
Another winter storm arrived on the California coastline on February 6. This storm also brought more snow to the Upper Midwest and Northeastern United States by February 9, although this one eventually moved off and even intensifying as a coastal storm, resulting in heavier snowfall accumulations of up to 1 foot (12 in; 30 cm) in parts of New England. Several churches in Massachusetts and New Hampshire did not hold services on February 9 due to the storm. Portions of Upstate New York recorded up to 9 in (23 cm) of snow, and further south, up to 4.8 in (12 cm) of snow fell on Long Island. Freezing rain and sleet fell in Washington D.C. and Philadelphia.

==== Third storm (February 10–12) ====
- Category 1 "Notable" (RSI/NOAA: 1.683)
- Duration: February 10 – February 12, 2025
- Lowest pressure: 1009 mb (29.80 inHg)
- Maximum snow: 14.5 in (37 cm)

Yet another winter storm developed in the central U.S. on February 11, this time bringing heavy snow to areas in the Mid-Atlantic states on February 11 as it moved swiftly to the east. Washington D.C. also saw its heaviest February snowfall since 2015, at 6.4 in (16 cm). Areas in West Virginia, Virginia, Maryland, Delaware and New Jersey recorded over 8 in (20 cm) of snow. The University of Maryland cancelled classes on February 12 due to the storm. While less snow fell on Long Island, there was still enough to lead to school delays on February 12. One person died in Nelson County, Kentucky due to icy roads, and over 190,000 customers lost power in Virginia alone, with an additional 13,000 customers losing power in North Carolina.

==== Fourth storm (February 11–13) ====
A fourth, more widespread winter storm began taking shape over the same areas on February 11, this time taking a more northerly track to the Upper Midwest and Ohio Valley. On February 11, a plane that landed at St. Louis Lambert International Airport skidded off the runway, but no one was injured.

The storm hit Southern Ontario and Quebec on the morning of February 13, with the system moving east hitting Atlantic Canada later in the day. Schools were closed across the region, including in all of New Brunswick. Some areas received over 30 cm (12 in) of snow. Lester B. Pearson International Airport in Toronto reported more snow than in all of January combined.

==== Fifth storm (February 13–16) ====
- Category 0 "Nuisance" (RSI/NOAA: N/A)
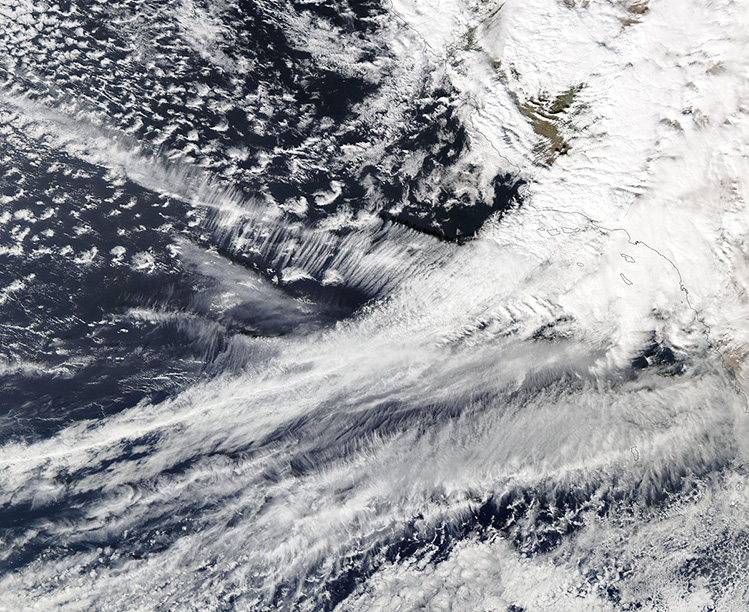
- Duration: February 13 – February 16, 2025
- Maximum snow: 55 in (140 cm)

The fifth winter storm, like the previous ones before, arrived on the West Coast on February 13, before moving into the Central U.S by February 15.

The storm hit southern Ontario and Quebec on February 16, causing flight delays and cancellations at Lester B. Pearson International and Pierre Elliott Trudeau International Airports, and blanketing the region with 20 to 40 centimetres of snow. Montreal and Laval reported around 40 cm of snow, while Quebec's Eastern Townships region received 35 cm. Meanwhile, the Greater Toronto Area received 25 to 30 cm of snow, Ottawa received 30 cm and Hamilton received 32 cm. Schools in the Greater Montreal area announced closures, while Ontarians already had the day off due to Family Day. The weather caused a major collision involving 20 vehicles on Autoroute 20 near Drummondville, Quebec. As the storm moved east into the Maritimes, it left the region with snow, freezing rain and high wind conditions. As a result, thousands of residents of Canada's Maritime provinces were left without power on February 17.

==== Sixth storm (February 18–21) ====
The sixth storm dropped heavy snow from the Plains and Ozarks to the Mid-Atlantic. Oates, Missouri reported 11 in (28 cm) of snow. Parts of eastern Oklahoma and Arkansas reported 0.10–0.15 in (0.25–0.38 cm) of ice. Norfolk, Virginia broke their daily maximum snowfall record for February 19, with 10.2 in (26 cm) falling, with the previous record being 0.6 in (1.5 cm) set back in 1989. The storm brought minimal snow to New York City on February 20, the last measurable snow of the season there.

=== March storm complexes ===
==== First storm (March 2–6) ====
- Category 0 "Nuisance" (RSI/NOAA: N/A)
- Duration: March 2 – March 6, 2025
- Lowest pressure: 980 mb (28.94 inHg)
- Maximum snow: 18 in (46 cm)
- Fatalities: 6 fatalities

A large scale blizzard began developing on March 2, the system developed as a Colorado low and rapidly strengthened on March 4. Very gusty winds were prevalent due to the immense size and strength of the system as a result.

Over 400,000 power outages have been reported to have been inflicted by the storm in the Dallas–Fort Worth metroplex, and at least five people have been killed, three in Mississippi. The storm is notably the first major weather event to hit the United States since the mass layoff of federal employees at the National Oceanic and Atmospheric Administration. Blizzard warnings were issued across the western and central parts of Iowa, with rain quickly transitioning to snow. Blizzard conditions were achieved over much of the warned area, with widespread wind gusts of 55-65 mph (89-105 kph) leading to visibilities of less than half a mile in most locations. During the morning of March 5, a 15+ vehicle pileup occurred on Interstate 35 in between Ames and Des Moines, leading to both directions of the interstate being shut down between those two cities. A separate pileup occurred on Interstate 80 near Newton. Interstate 80 was also shut down in both directions between Avoca and Des Moines due to widespread zero visibility and drifting snow.

==== Second storm (March 14–15) ====
On March 14 and 15, as a significant tornado outbreak unfolded across the Central United States, the colder side of the system produced heavy snow in the state of Minnesota. Blizzard warnings were issued there as well. The heaviest snow was expected to occur on the northwestern quadrant of the cyclone, specifically across central and western Minnesota, where snowfall rates were expected to exceed 1 in (2.5 cm) per hour.

==== Third storm (March 18–19) ====
- Category 0 "Nuisance" (RSI/NOAA: N/A)
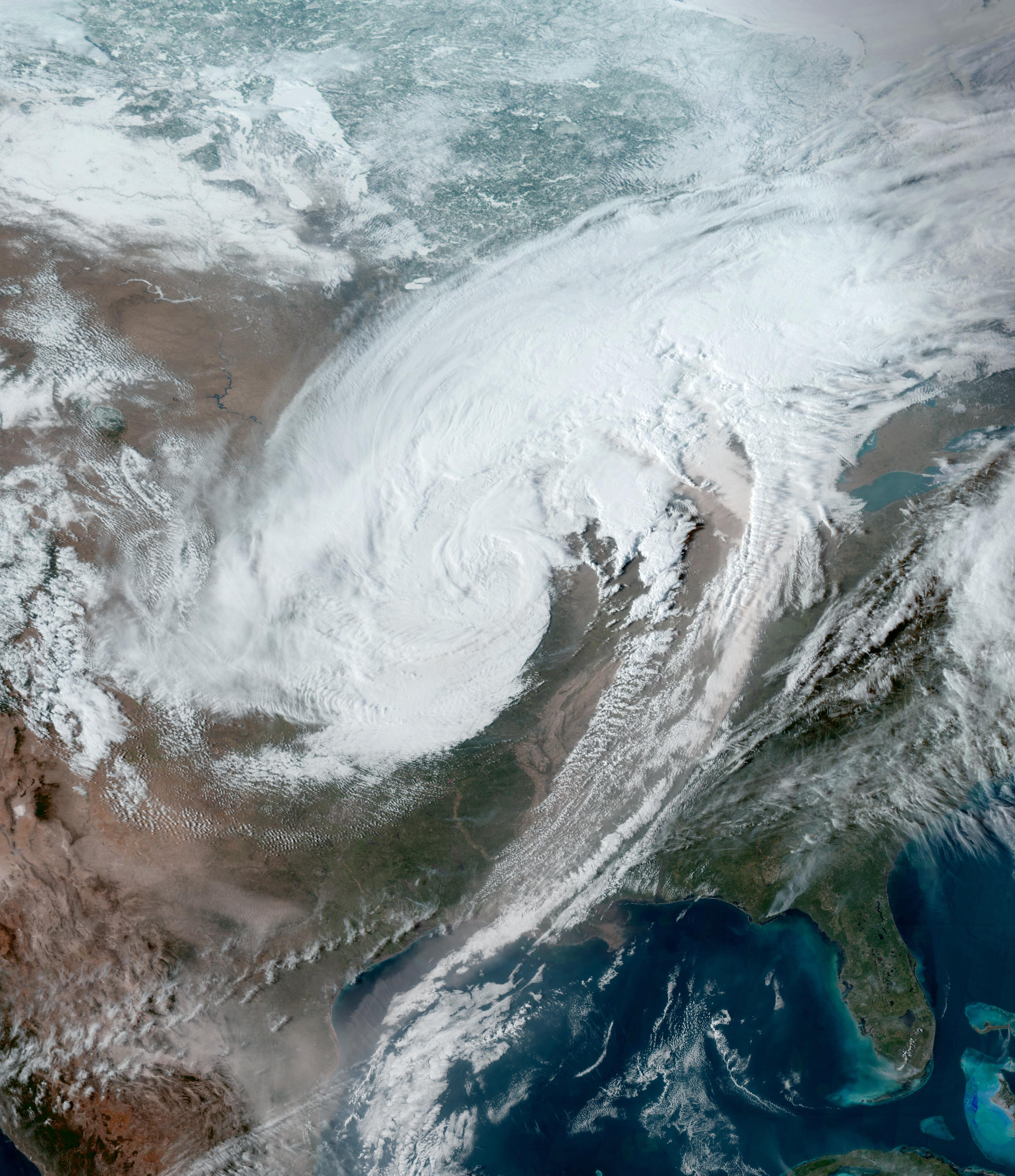
- Duration: March 18 – March 19, 2025
- Lowest pressure: 984 mb (29.06 inHg)
- Maximum snow: 26.77 in (68.0 cm)

A strong winter storm, nicknamed Winter Storm Nyla by The Weather Channel, produced significant impacts across the United States. Notably, a strong blizzard occurred over the High Plains and Midwest, where winter weather and blizzard warnings were issued. Thunderstorm development created the risk for severe weather and tornadoes, especially in northern Illinois and Indiana. At least 13 tornadoes touched down on March 19.

=== Late March ice storm ===
A rare and powerful ice storm impacted parts of the Great Lakes, the Northeast, and southern Canada, which was the worst ice storm to hit northern Michigan in over 100 years, where the worst impacts were observed. Temperatures consistently remained at around 31–32 °F (−1–0 °C) for days, causing the ice to not melt enough. Nearly 1 million customers were without power in both the U.S. and Canada, with hundreds of trees falling and snapping. Three children were killed in the Kalamazoo, Michigan area after a tree crushed a car. An additional fatality occurred in Stockbridge Township, Michigan where a man was crushed in his home after a tree fell on his house. 1.5 in (38 mm) of freezing rain fell in Elmira, Michigan, while 0.94 in (24 mm) of freezing rain fell in Marlow, New Hampshire. In Wisconsin, ice totals from 0.25–0.6 in (6.4–15.2 mm) were observed, with 0.5 in (13 mm) of ice being observed in Portage. In Michigan's Upper Peninsula, up to 20 in (51 cm) of snow fell, with Trowbridge Park seeing 17.7 in (45 cm) of snow, while 16.2 in (41 cm) of snow fell in Harvey. 0.25 in (6.4 mm) of ice fell in Newberry and Alpena. On April 1, Michigan governor Gretchen Whitmer declared a state of emergency in 10 counties in order to help with recovery efforts. damages amounted to roughly US$625 million.

=== Late May nor'easter ===
- Category 0 "Nuisance" (RSI/NOAA: N/A)
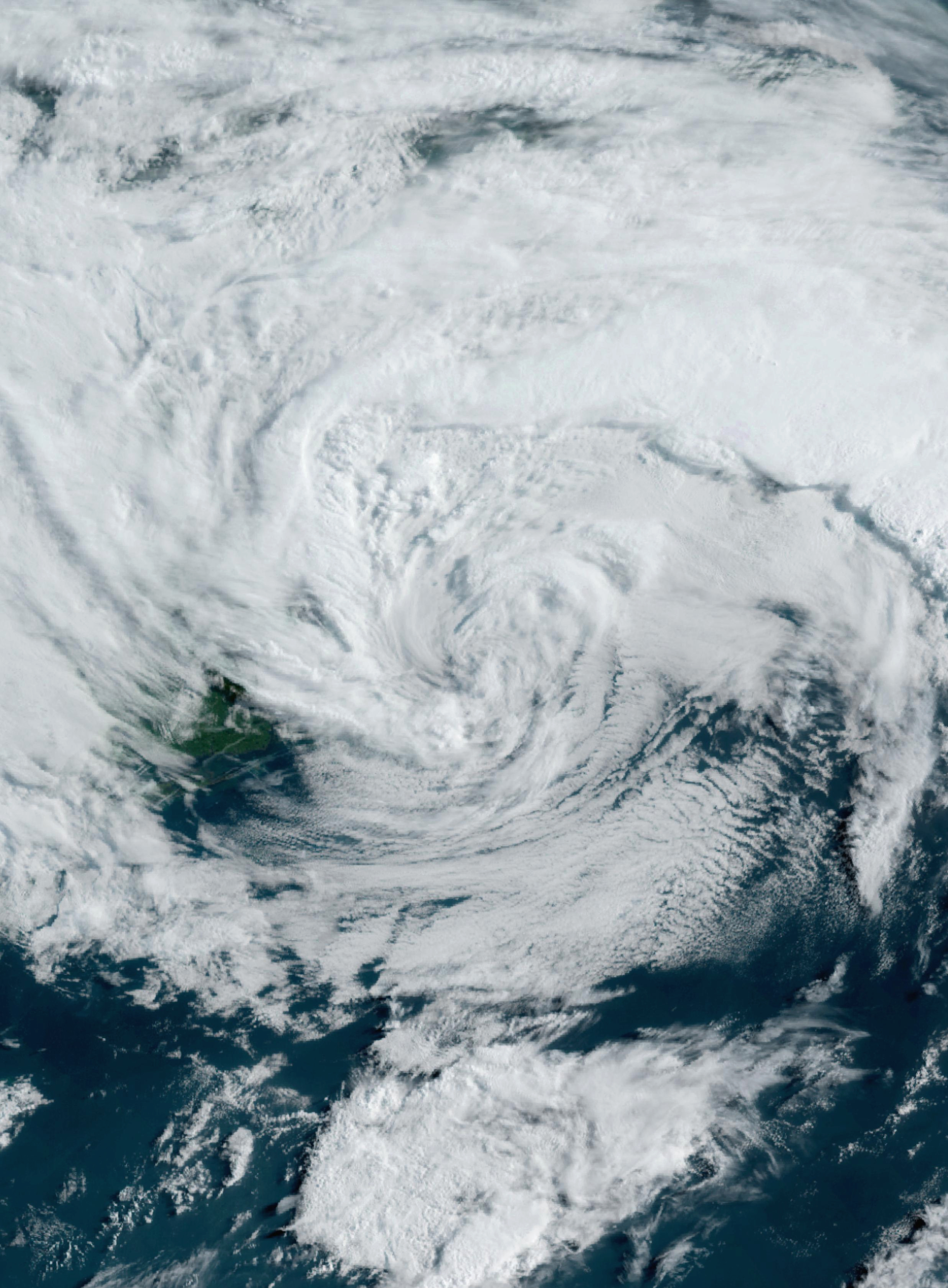
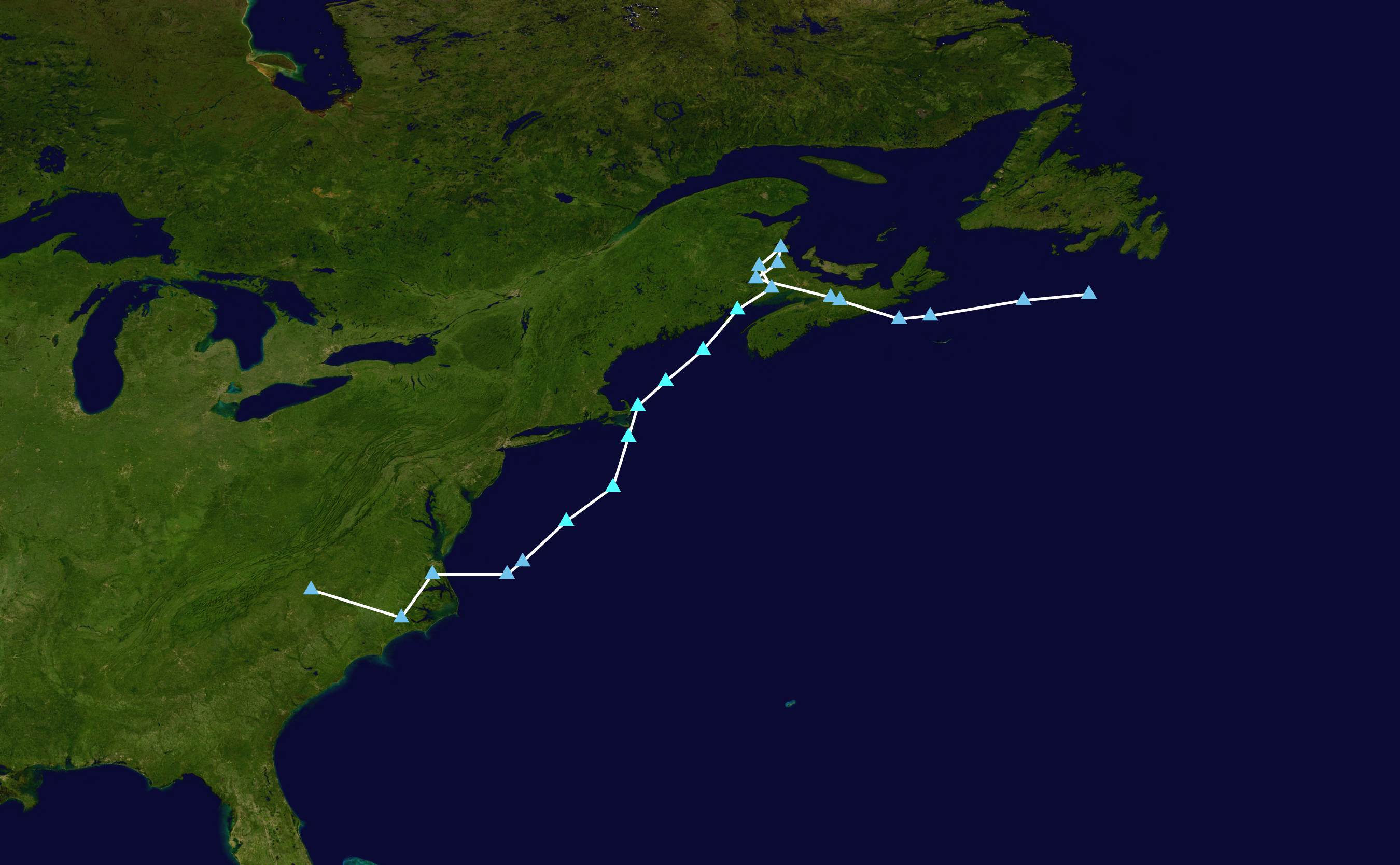
- Duration: May 21 – May 24, 2025
- Lowest pressure: 995 mb (29.38 inHg)
- Maximum snow: 12.4 in (31 cm)
- Fatalities: 2 indirect fatalities

An unusual late-season nor'easter impacted the Northeastern United States and Atlantic Canada. It was accompanied by unseasonably cold temperatures and set record cold daily high temperatures across New England and the New York metropolitan area. Significant snow fell in the mountains of New Hampshire and Mount Katahdin. These conditions on Mount Katahdin led to the deaths of two hikers on June 1. Further north, the storm brought snowfall to parts of Quebec and the Maritimes.

== Records ==
=== Eastern United States ===
Snowfall in Babbie, Alabama reached 11 in (28 cm) during the January Gulf Coast storm, while Mobile Regional Airport recorded 7.5 in (19 cm) of snowfall. This broke the most snowfall in the latter city, breaking the record of 6 in (15 cm) set in 1895. Milton, Florida recorded 9.8 in (25 cm) of snowfall. This was more than twice the highest amount of snowfall ever recorded in the state in a single storm.

=== Southwestern United States ===
Much of southern California experienced their driest winter-to-date by January 17, due to persistent ridging over the region, which contributed to multiple devastating wildfires there.

=== Canada ===
Montreal received a record amount of snowfall in a four-day period from February 13–17, receiving at least 75 centimetres (30 in). Orillia had its snowiest February on record, and its second-snowiest month overall, with approximately 180 centimetres (71 in) alone, with a grand total of 461 centimetres (181 in). This was a product of persistent lake-effect snow storms affecting the city. This accumulation was described as being as tall as a giraffe, which measures roughly the same height.

== Season effects ==
This is a table of all of the events that have occurred in the 2024–25 North American winter. It includes their duration, damage, impacted locations, and death totals. Deaths in parentheses are additional and indirect (an example of an indirect death would be a traffic accident), but were still related to that storm. All of the damage figures are in 2025 USD.

Regional snowfall index scale
C0	C1	C2	C3	C4	C5

2024–25 North American winter season statistics
Event name	Dates active	RSI category	RSI value	Highest gust mph (km/h)	Minimum pressure (mbar)	Maximum snow in (cm)	Maximum ice in (mm)	Areas affected	Damage (2025 USD)	Deaths
Early November blizzard	November 7–9	N/A	N/A	84 (135)	Unknown	40.7 (103)	N/A	Southern Rocky Mountains, High Plains	Unknown	None
November 2024 Northeast Pacific bomb cyclone	November 19–21	N/A	N/A	101 (163)	942	20 (51)	N/A	British Columbia, Washington, Oregon, California	Unknown	4
Late November–early December lake-effect snow	November 28–December 2	N/A	N/A	Unknown	Unknown	65.5 (166)	N/A	Northeastern United States	Unknown	2
Pre-Christmas Northeast U.S. winter storm	December 19–22	N/A	N/A	Unknown	Unknown	9 (23)	N/A	Midwestern United States, Eastern United States, Eastern Canada	Unknown	None
January 5–6, 2025 United States blizzard	January 3–7	Category 2	3.02	N/A	976	20.5 (52)	N/A	Pacific Northwest, Rocky Mountains, High Plains, Ohio Valley, Mid-Atlantic states	$100 million	10
January 9–11, 2025 United States winter storm	January 8–11	Category 2	4.13	N/A	967	14.3 (36)	0.5 (13)	Mexico, Southern United States, Ohio Valley	$115 million	None
January 19–20, 2025 nor'easter	January 18–20	N/A	3.407	45 (72)	960	16 (41)	0.50 (12.7)	Ohio Valley, Northeastern United States, New England, Atlantic Canada	Minimal	None
2025 Gulf Coast blizzard	January 20–22	Category 1	2.93	Unknown	939	13.4 (34)	0.25 (6.4)	Gulf Coast of the United States, Southeastern United States	$200 million	13
February 10–12, 2025 North American winter storm	February 10–12	Category 1	1.683	N/A	Unknown	Unknown	Unknown	Mid-Atlantic States	Unknown	Unknown
February 11–13, 2025 North American winter storm	February 11–13	Category 1	1.309	N/A	Unknown	Unknown	Unknown	Eastern United States	Unknown	Unknown
February 2025 North American storm complex	February 15–16	N/A	N/A	126 (203)	Unknown	55 (140)	Unknown	California, Ohio Valley	$1.735 billion	18
February 18–21, 2025 North American winter storm	February 18–21	Category 1	2.546	N/A	Unknown	Unknown	Unknown	Central United States	$110 million	Unknown
Early March 2025 North American blizzard	March 2–6	N/A	N/A	85 (137)	Unknown	18 (46)	Unknown	Southern United States	Unknown	6
March 13–16, 2025 North American winter storm	March 13–16	N/A	N/A	Unknown	Unknown	Unknown	Unknown	Upper Midwest	Unknown	None
Mid-March 2025 North American blizzard	March 17–21	N/A	N/A	Unknown	984	26.77 (68)	Unknown	Western United States, Great Plains, Midwestern United States	Unknown	None
Late March 2025 North American ice storm	March 28–30	N/A	N/A	Unknown	Unknown	Unknown	1.5 (38)	Great Lakes, Northeastern United States, Southern Canada	$625 million	None
May 2025 nor'easter	May 21–24	N/A	N/A	74 (119)	995	12.4 (31)	Unknown	Northeastern United States, Atlantic Canada	Unknown	0 (2)
Season aggregates
6 RSI storms	November 7 – May 24				939	65.5 (166)	1.5 (38)		≥ $3.385 billion	53 (2)

== See also ==
- List of major snow and ice events in the United States
- 2024–25 European windstorm season
- Tornadoes of 2024
- Tornadoes of 2025
- Weather of 2024
- Weather of 2025

Preceded by 2023–24	North American winters 2024–25	Succeeded by 2025-26
