= January 9–11, 2025 United States winter storm =

Weather event in the southern United States

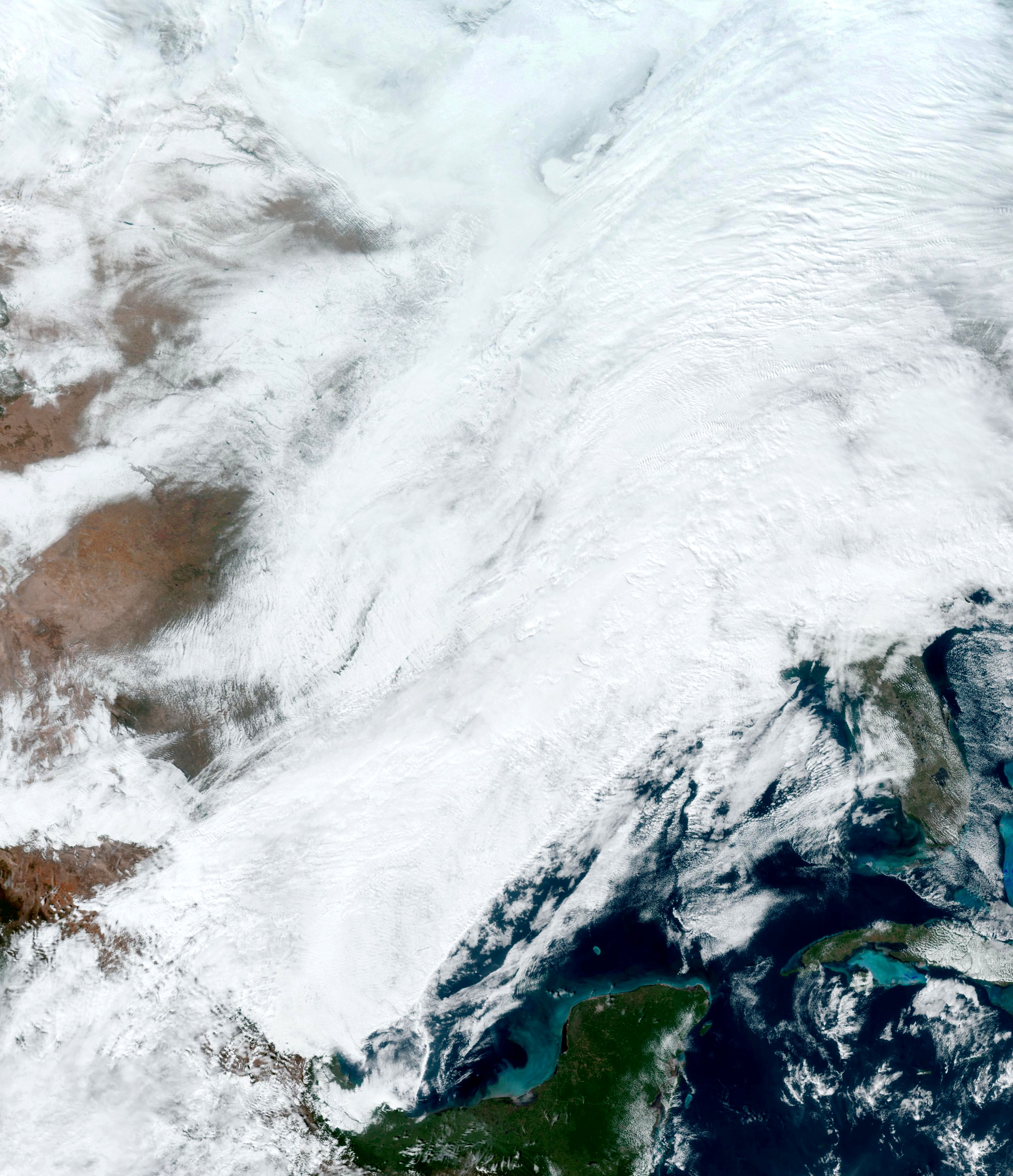
- The winter storm across the southern United States on January 10

Meteorological history
- Formed: January 8, 2025
- Exited land: January 11, 2025
- Dissipated: January 15, 2025

Category 2 "Minor" winter storm
- Regional snowfall index: 4.13 (NOAA)
- Lowest pressure: 967 mbar (hPa); 28.56 inHg
- Max. snowfall: Snowfall – 14.3 in (36 cm) in Mena, Arkansas; Ice – 0.5 in (13 mm) near Idabel, Oklahoma

Overall effects
- Fatalities: 1
- Damage: $115 million (2025 USD)
- Areas affected: Mexico, Southern United States, Ohio Valley
- Power outages: >120,000
- Part of the 2024–25 North American winter

A significant and widespread winter storm, unofficially named Winter Storm Cora by the Weather Channel, brought major impacts to the southern half of the United States from January 9 to 11, 2025. The system developed as a shortwave trough moved east across the southwestern United States. It developed into a Gulf low on January 8, and proceeded to bring upwards of up to 12 inches (30 cm) of snow to a large swath of the Ozarks as well as Texas all the way eastward to the Carolinas, with light snow accumulations as far north as southern New England. By January 11, most of the impacts from the storm had ended as it moved offshore.

Approximately 80 million people were estimated to be impacted by the winter storm, with state of emergencies declared across several states in advance of the storm. Cities that rarely see much snowfall at all, such as Atlanta, Georgia, received accumulating snow in addition to other wintry precipitation, leading to very hazardous conditions and numerous flight delays as well as travel-related accidents. More than 120,000 people are estimated to have lost power as a result of the storm, the majority of which came from the state of Georgia near the city of Atlanta which suffered major impacts and the worst storm there since the 2014 winter storm. With over 3,000 flights cancelled, the winter storm was responsible for the most significant daily delays since July 2024.

== Meteorological history ==
Map plotting the storm's track and intensity, according to the Saffir–Simpson scale Map key Saffir–Simpson scale Tropical depression (≤38 mph, ≤62 km/h) Tropical storm (39–73 mph, 63–118 km/h) Category 1 (74–95 mph, 119–153 km/h) Category 2 (96–110 mph, 154–177 km/h) Category 3 (111–129 mph, 178–208 km/h) Category 4 (130–156 mph, 209–251 km/h) Category 5 (≥157 mph, ≥252 km/h) Unknown Storm type Tropical cyclone Subtropical cyclone Extratropical cyclone, remnant low, tropical disturbance, or monsoon depression

A shortwave trough moved eastward through the Southwestern United States on January 7, from an upper-level disturbance that was partially associated with causing the wildfires in the state of California. This energy then moved eastwards into the western Gulf of Mexico the following day, drawing moisture into the state of Texas and eventually developing into a Gulf low south of Galveston. By 03:00 UTC on January 10, the Weather Prediction Center (WPC) began issuing storm summary bulletins for the developing winter storm as snowfall was already falling in northern Texas and southern Oklahoma.

== Preparations ==
=== Texas ===
The storm was the first significant winter storm threat for the state since the February 2021 storm. Governor Greg Abbott said that unlike that storm, he had more confidence in the state’s ERCOT power grid and would not be as severe. Schools were also closed within the northern portion of the state where the heaviest accumulations were expected. 350 warming centers were deployed across most of Texas as well. The Texas Department of Transportation had over 2,000 crews out treating the roads.

=== Deep South ===
In Arkansas, where Governor Sarah Huckabee Sanders declared a state of emergency, the National Guard was activated to help stranded residents on the roads.

=== Southeast ===
North Carolina, still recovering from the aftermath of Hurricane Helene, deployed more than 100 National Guard troops ready to assist in the western and central parts of the state.

== Impact ==
=== Greater Ark-La-Tex region ===
Jackknifed tractor trailers were reported within the states of Texas, as well as cars getting stuck on the freeways. Snowfall of up to 2.2 in (5.6 cm) in Dallas was reported.

In Oklahoma, cars also got stuck due to the wintry weather, and a crash on I-35 resulted in stranded motorists for hours. The Oklahoma Highway Patrol said on January 9 that they had responded to at least 500 collisions, of which 85 had resulted in an unknown amount of injuries. A total of 3.2 inches (8.1 cm) was recorded within Oklahoma City.

=== Southeast ===
In the city of Atlanta, Georgia, at least 1,200 flights were canceled and a full ground stop was issued, both as a result of snow and icy conditions on the morning of January 10. Georgia Department of Transportation Commissioner Russell McMurry also stated that there were "significant amount[s]" of spinouts reported on major roadways. Crashes were also reported on I-75 and I-285. Approximately 600 snowplows were activated to be used across the city. The state carried the majority of the power outages responsible from the winter storm, with at least 100,000 alone. Statewide, the Georgia Department of Public Safety reported about 225 crashes. Four people were injured in the storm within the city when a flight bound for Minneapolis aborted takeoff due to the storm. Officially, 2.1 inches (5.3 cm) of snow fell at the Atlanta airport, the largest snowstorm in years for the city, although areas stretching from Austell to Snellville (including Downtown, Midtown and Buckhead) generally recorded 3-5 inches of snow. The Atlanta Hawks home game against the Houston Rockets, scheduled for January 11, was postponed due to roads covered in ice and snow.

Charlotte, North Carolina also reported 0.4 in (1.0 cm) of snow, breaking the longest snowless streak on record for the city. In Alabama, a man died due to hypothermia during the storm.

=== Ohio Valley ===
While the majority of impacts from the storm were in the South, light snowfall was reported up north in the Ohio Valley, such as Ohio, Indiana and Kentucky, with accumulations of up to 1–2 inches (2.5–5.1 cm) or less. Impacts were generally minor.

== See also ==
- February 2015 Southeastern United States winter storm
- February 13–17, 2021 North American winter storm
- January 2014 Gulf Coast winter storm
