= January 19–20, 2025 nor'easter =

Weather event in the United States

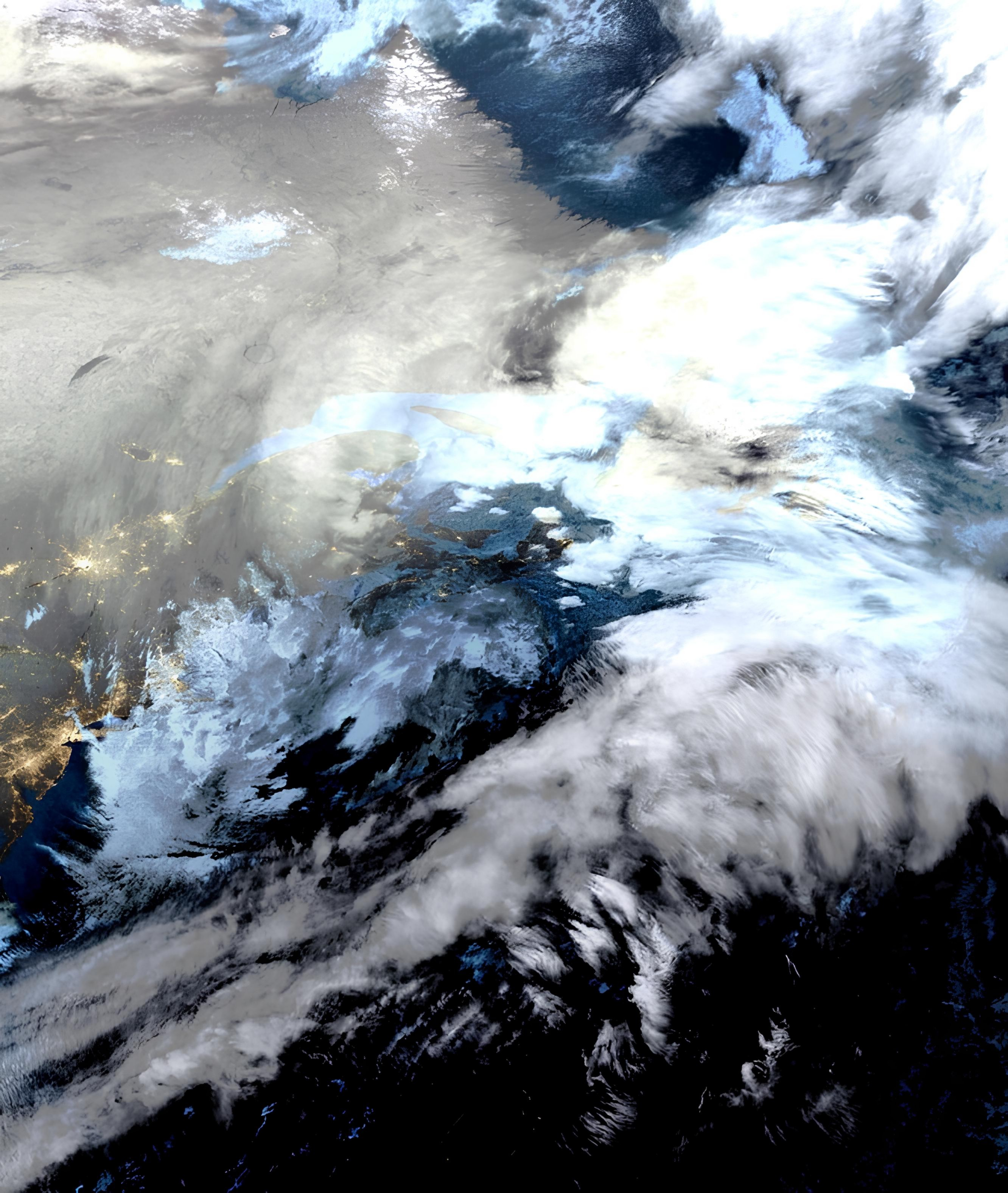
- GOES-16 infrared satellite image of the nor'easter intensifying over the Northeastern United States and Atlantic Canada at 08:50 UTC (3:50 a.m. EST) on January 20, 2025

Meteorological history
- Formed: January 18, 2025
- Exited land: January 20, 2025
- Dissipated: January 22, 2025

Winter storm
- Highest gusts: 45 mph (72 km/h) near Mount Desert, Maine
- Lowest pressure: 954 hPa (mbar); 28.17 inHg
- Max. snowfall: Snowfall – 16 in (41 cm) near Thomas and Elkins, West Virginia

Overall effects
- Damage: Unknown
- Areas affected: Ohio Valley, Northeastern United States, New England, Atlantic Canada
- Power outages: >6,000
- Part of the 2024–25 North American winter

From January 19 to 20, 2025, a fast-moving and quickly-developing nor'easter, unofficially named Winter Storm Demi by The Weather Channel, brought accumulating snowfall to much of the Northeastern United States. The origins of the storm were complex, with an area of low pressure developing on the backside of a cold front that had swept through the region on January 19. The system quickly organized, with snowfall breaking out across the Mid-Atlantic by later that day as the storm began moving offshore. By early the next day on January 20, the event had ended for most in the Northeast as the nor'easter moved out to sea, rapidly strengthened and then moved through Atlantic Canada, peaking in intensity on January 22 over the Arctic Sea before dissipating. Within the U.S., snowfall accumulations of 8–12 inches (20–30 cm) were common across much of the interior Northeast and into portions of eastern Canada as well.

Several states within the Northeast declared a state of emergency, both in anticipation for the storm and the very cold temperatures that were expected to follow in the coming days after the storm passed . Many flights were delayed or cancelled as a result of the storm, and a long stretch of winter storm warnings and winter weather advisories were issued for millions of U.S. residents across the Northeast. Approximately 6,000 people were estimated to have lost power as a result of the nor'easter, mainly in New York and Pennsylvania and at least one injury was confirmed from a vehicle pileup due to the snow.

== Meteorological history ==
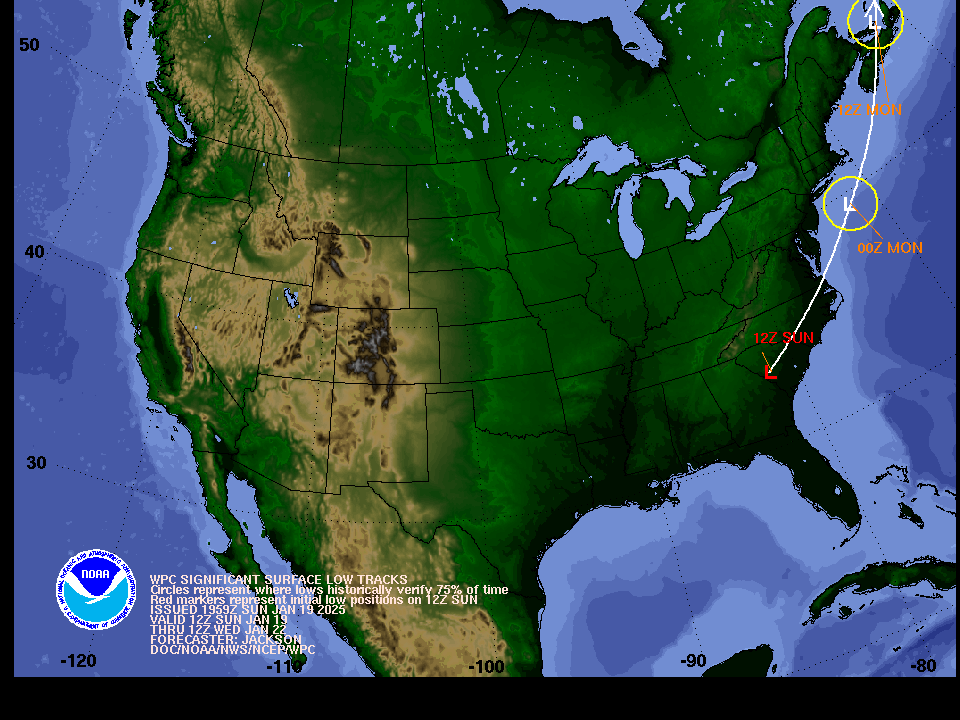
Weather Prediction Center (WPC) graphic showing the track of the low-pressure associated with the storm

Map plotting the storm's track and intensity, according to the Saffir–Simpson scale Map key Saffir–Simpson scale Tropical depression (≤38 mph, ≤62 km/h) Tropical storm (39–73 mph, 63–118 km/h) Category 1 (74–95 mph, 119–153 km/h) Category 2 (96–110 mph, 154–177 km/h) Category 3 (111–129 mph, 178–208 km/h) Category 4 (130–156 mph, 209–251 km/h) Category 5 (≥157 mph, ≥252 km/h) Unknown Storm type Tropical cyclone Subtropical cyclone Extratropical cyclone, remnant low, tropical disturbance, or monsoon depression

Beginning on January 14, meteorologists had anticipated that an area of low pressure would develop off the Northeastern United States and bring light snow to the region, but had lots of uncertainty in its strength and track. The anticipated feature was expected to develop as a frontal wave on the backside of an arctic front that would bring bitterly cold temperatures in its wake. Computer models began converging on a stronger system and heavier snowfall totals by January 17. The following day, a cold front moved through the Northeastern United States. By 09:00 UTC on January 19, behind the front, a weak surface low developed near the Georgia–South Carolina border. Throughout the day, precipitation blossomed across the Mid-Atlantic states as the system moved offshore into the Atlantic Ocean. Intensification ensued at a modest pace, with banding features developing over portions of Pennsylvania, New York and parts of New Jersey as well. By 03:00 UTC on January 20, the Weather Prediction Center (WPC) issued its first storm summary bulletin on the developing nor'easter as it steadily intensified.

Because of its speed, the system's extent moved through the Northeast fast, which limited the extent of snow accumulation. As a result, snow from the nor'easter tapered off west to east, and by 12:00 UTC that day, the system was already located near Atlantic Canada. Three hours later, after the system had completely exited the U.S., the WPC issued its second and final storm summary bulletin on the storm; by this time, rapid deepening was beginning to ensue as it made landfall on and pass through Atlantic Canada, with the central pressure down to 984 mb (29.1 inHg) – a drop of 24 millibars (0.71 inHg) from a day prior. Rapid strengthening continued, and the system peaked in intensity by 00:00 UTC on January 22 with a pressure of 954 mb (28.2 inHg), after it emerged into the Arctic Ocean. The system began weakening afterward, meandering around until it was absorbed by another nearby cyclone later that day.

== Preparations ==
=== Mid-Atlantic states ===
==== Virginia, Maryland and Delaware ====
The Virginia Department of Transportation (VDOT) advised residents to prepare for the storm, and said that residents should move their vehicles off of the streets so that snowplows could work. Approximately 2,500 pieces of equipment were ready to be deployed during the storm to clear roads and making the subdivisions accessible to citizens.

The Martin Luther King Jr. Day parade in the state of Maryland set to take place on January 20 was cancelled due to the expected winter storm and following bitterly cold temperatures after the storm passes through.

Delaware power grid operator PJM issued a cold weather alert ahead of the storm and arctic front on January 18. This was done in order to avoid a repeat of what happened after a winter storm in 2022 brought similarly bitter cold in its wake and caused massive demand to the power grid.

==== Washington D.C. ====
While not caused by the storm itself, but rather due to the freezing temperatures expected behind the nor'easter, president-elect Donald Trump announced on January 17 that his second inauguration ceremony would be moved indoors, and would take place in the Capitol rotunda. This was the first time this occurred since the public second inauguration of Ronald Reagan on January 21, 1985.

==== Pennsylvania, New Jersey and New York ====
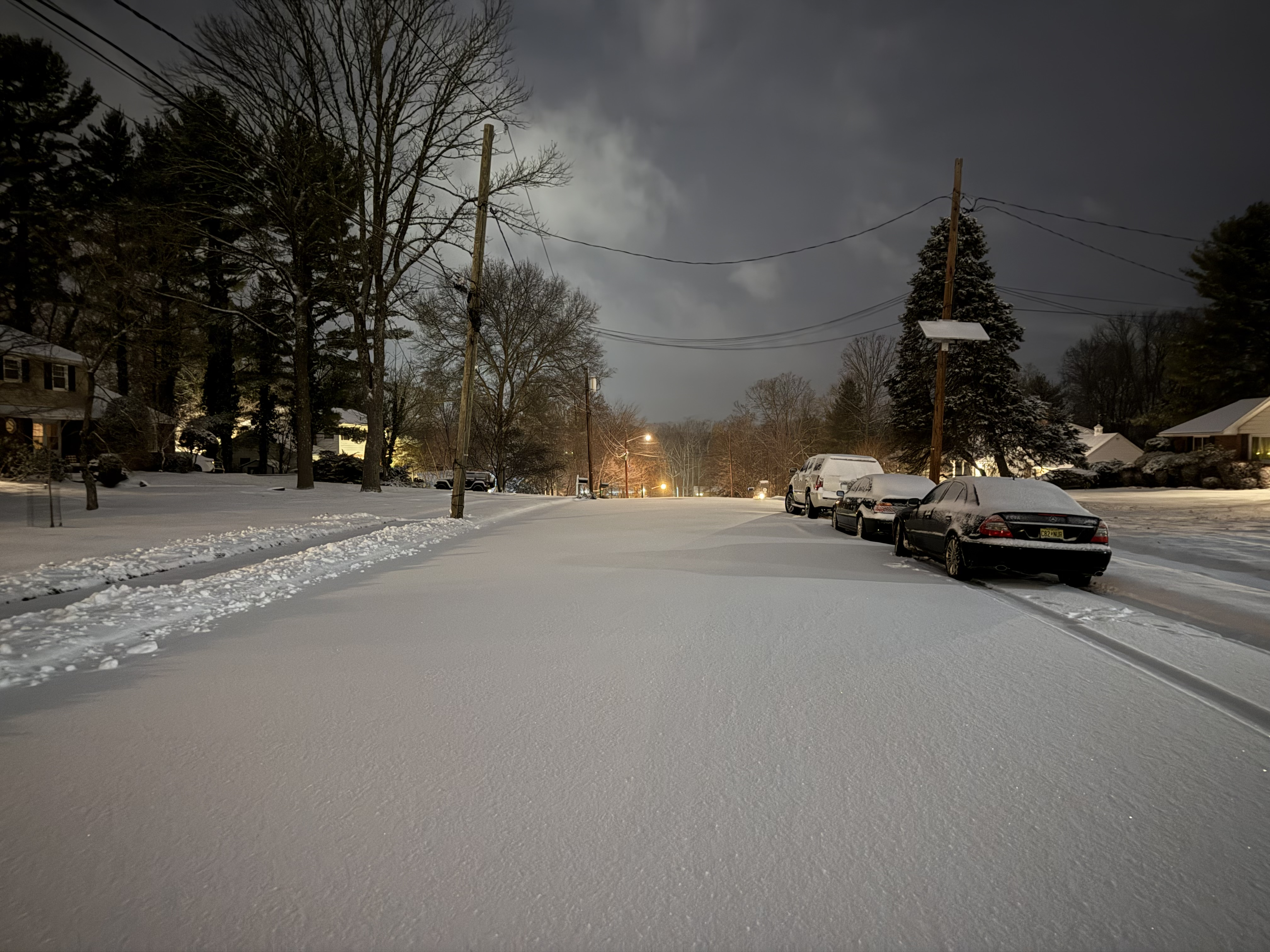
Snow from the storm covers a residential street in New Jersey on January 19, 2025

New Jersey Governor Phil Murphy declared a state of emergency on January 18 for the entire state in advance of the nor'easter. The New Jersey Department of Transportation (NJDOT) issued a vehicle restriction on both lanes across most of the major roadways and interstates in the state, which included I-287, I-76, I-195, I-80, I-280, I-295 and I-676. A parking advisory was issued, and the New Jersey Department of Safety said it would respond to any incidents of burglary or other weather-related incidents during the storm.

A snow alert was issued for New York City, expected to begin at 7 a.m. on January 19 at the onset of the storm. Plows and sanitation crews were prepared, with over 20 million pounds of salt ready for use on the roads. Alternate-side parking was suspended for the day of January 20, both due to the storm and also in observance of Martin Luther King Jr. Day. New York Governor Kathy Hochul said that residents further north from the city should also prepare. Additionally, at least 1,630 plow trucks were readied statewide.

=== New England ===
==== Connecticut to Massachusetts ====
Connecticut state governor Ned Lamont said residents should prepare for significant snowfall and advised people stay off the roads during the storm. The Connecticut Department of Transportation (CDOT) said it had 600 snowplows and snow removal equipment on standby as well.

In Massachusetts, a parking ban was enacted in the town of Fairhaven. In addition, state governor Maura Healey issued various tips to residents in order for them to stay safe during the storm.

== Impact ==
=== Mid-Atlantic states ===
==== Pennsylvania, New Jersey and New York ====
Several vehicles, including two tractor trailers were involved in a pileup on Interstate 80 in Pennsylvania in Clearfield County, Pennsylvania, with a state trooper's car also being involved in the wreck. At least one person was injured as a result.

Within the state of New Jersey, thundersnow was officially reported within Essex County by the National Weather Service office in New York. Remarkably, no accidents occurred within the state, despite a majority of New Jersey receiving snow totals of 4–6 inches (10–15 cm), mainly in the northern half of the state.

Near New York City, New York, a full ground delay program was enacted at the John F. Kennedy International Airport. Snowfall totals varied within the New York metropolitan area, due to precipitation mixing early on, with the highest being 8.1 in (21 cm) at Highland Mills. Comparatively, a total of only 1.6 in (4.1 cm) of snow had fallen at Central Park.

=== New England ===
==== Connecticut to Massachusetts ====
Slippery roads were reported within the state of Connecticut. Snowfall totals ended up being somewhat lower than expected, with 2–3 inches (5.1–7.6 cm) reported close to the coast, while 3–6 inches (7.6–15.2 cm) were reported in the interior parts of Connecticut.

Up to 100 crashes were reported on roadways in New Hampshire, where state troopers responded early in the morning on January 20. Road closures were also common as well. The highest total reported within the state was 7 inches (18 cm) in the town of Nashua.

In the state of Massachusetts, most impacts weren't large, particularly due to the storm's timing with Martin Luther King Jr. Day, which officials said kept most residents of the roads and reducing possible accidents. The largest accumulation of snowfall was 8 inches (20 cm) in Ashfield, while further east, the city of Boston saw a peak accumulation of 4.5 inches (11 cm).

== See also ==
- January 20–22, 2014 North American blizzard
- February 2024 nor'easter
