= List of major snow and ice events in the United States =

The following is a list of major snow and ice events in the United States that have caused noteworthy damage and destruction in their wake. The categories presented below are not used to measure the strength of a storm, but are rather indicators of how severely the snowfall affected the population in the storm's path. Some information such as snowfall amounts or lowest pressure may be unavailable due to a lack of documentation. Winter storms can produce both ice and snow, but are usually more notable in one of these two categories. The "Maximum accumulation" sections reflect the more notable category which is represented in inches of snow unless otherwise stated. Only category 1 and higher storms as defined by their regional snowfall index are included here.

- Note: A blizzard is defined as having sustained winds of at least 35 mph for three hours or more.

Regional snowfall index
Category	RSI value	Description
Five	18.0+	Extreme
Four	10–18	Crippling
Three	6–10	Major
Two	3–6	Significant
One	1–3	Notable
Zero	<1.0	Nuisance

== Seasonal summaries ==
The following is a table that shows North American winter season summaries dating back to 2007. While there is no well-agreed-upon date used to indicate the start of winter in the Northern Hemisphere, there are two definitions of winter which may be used. The first is astronomical winter, which has the season starting on a date known as the winter solstice, often on or around December 21. The season lasts until the spring equinox, which often occurs on or around March 20. The second has to do with meteorological winter which varies with latitude for a start date. Winter is often defined by meteorologists to be the three calendar months with the lowest average temperatures. Since both definitions span the start of the calendar year, it is possible to have a winter storm occur two different years.

Winter season	Maximum accumulation	Number of RSI events
2007–2008	132 inches (340 cm) (January 2–7)	6
2008–2009	35 inches (89 cm) (December 18–22, 2008)	10
2009–2010	53 inches (130 cm) (February 25–27, 2010)	17
2010–2011	50 inches (130 cm) (January 16–20, 2012)	12
2011–2012	53 inches (130 cm) (February 25–27, 2010)	3
2012–2013	40 inches (100 cm) (February 7–18, 2013)	19
2013–2014	58 inches (150 cm) (October 3–7, 2013)	11
2014–2015	88 inches (220 cm) (November 13–21, 2014)	11
2015–2016	51.3 inches (130 cm) (April 15–23, 2016)	3
2016–2017	58 inches (150 cm) (March 11–15, 2017)	4
2017–2018	39.3 inches (100 cm) (March 1–3, 2018)	7
2018–2019	52 inches (130 cm) (March 8–16, 2019)	10
2019–2020	114 inches (290 cm) (March 18–22)	1
2020–2021	107 inches (270 cm) (January 25–February 3, 2021)	6
2021–2022	60 inches (150 cm) (December 13–18, 2021)	6
2022–2023	81.2 inches (206 cm) (November 16–20, 2022)	5
2023–2024	49.5 inches (126 cm) (January 13–16, 2024)	2
2024–2025	65.5 inches (166 cm) (November 28–December 3, 2024)	6
2025–2026	115 inches (290 cm) (February 15-20, 2026)	6
2026–2027	19 inches (48 cm); October 10-12, 2026	0

== 18th–19th century ==
Year	Date	Maximum accumulation	Lowest pressure	Type
1717 (Note: This event included multiple different storms.)	February 27 – March 7	—N/a	—N/a	Storm
1804	October 4–11	48 inches (120 cm)	977 hPa (28.9 inHg) (Note: The 1804 New England hurricane caused a major snow event.)	Blizzard
1886	January 6–11	18.5 inches (47 cm)	—N/a	Blizzard
1888	January 12–13	6 inches (15 cm)	—N/a	Blizzard
1888	March 11–14	58 inches (150 cm)	982 hPa (29.0 inHg)	Blizzard
1899	February 10–14	—N/a	—N/a	Blizzard

== 20th century ==
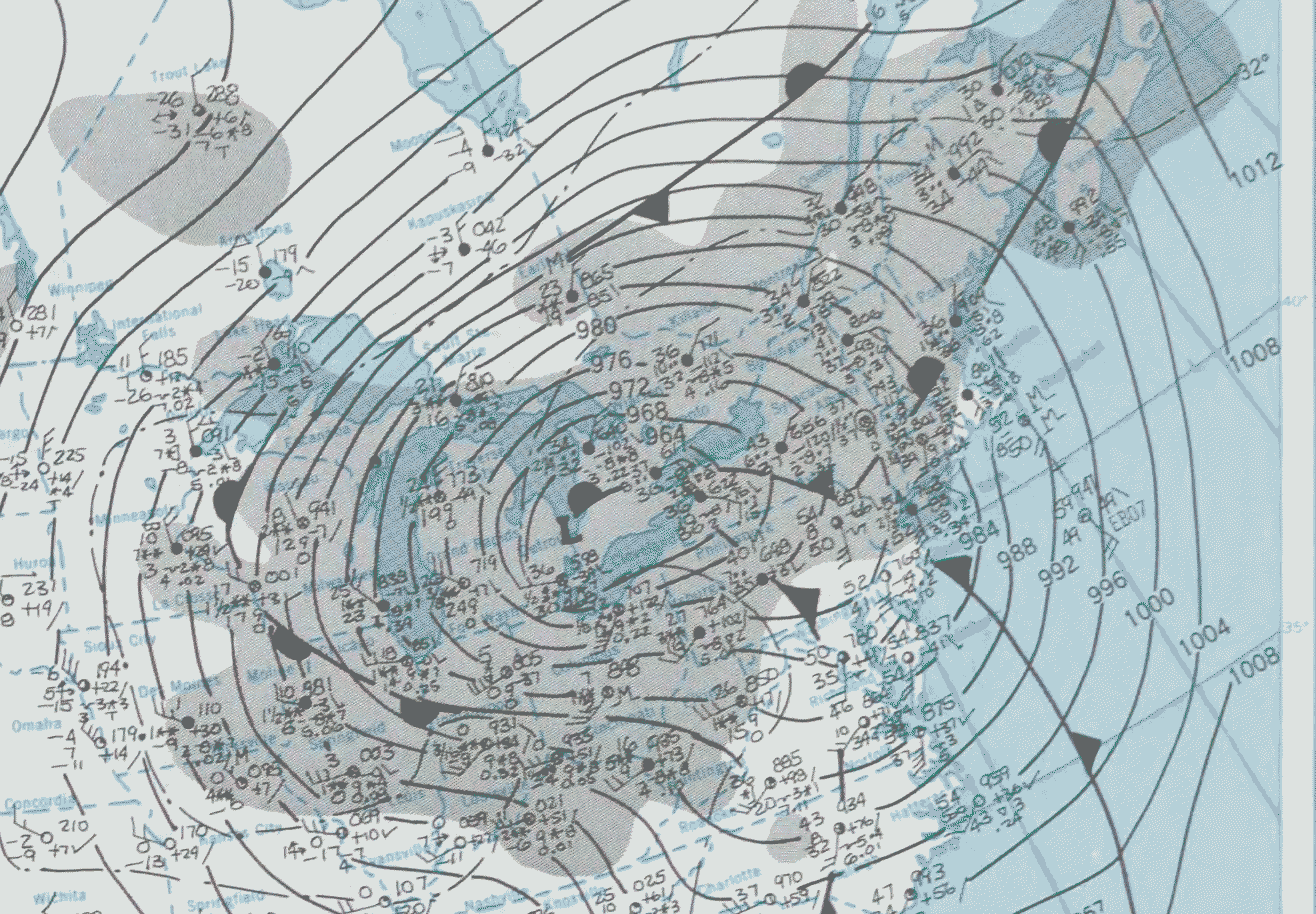
The Great Blizzard of 1978 was the most intense storm of the 20th century.

Year	Date	Maximum accumulation	Lowest pressure	Type	Category (RSI)
1905	November 27–28	—N/a	991 hPa (29.3 inHg)	Storm	—N/a
1913	November 6–11	24 inches (61 cm)	968.5 hPa (28.60 inHg)	Blizzard	—N/a
1920	March 15–18	—N/a	—N/a	Blizzard	—N/a
1922	January 27–29	—N/a	—N/a	Blizzard	Category 5
1940	November 10–12	27 inches (69 cm)	971 hPa (28.7 inHg)	Blizzard	—N/a
1944	December 10-13	36 inches (91 cm)	—N/a	Storm	Category 3
1947	December 25–26	26.4 inches (67 cm)	—N/a	Blizzard	Category 3
1950	November 24–30	57 inches (140 cm)	978 hPa (28.9 inHg)	Blizzard	Category 5
1952	February 17–18	—N/a	—N/a	Storm	—N/a
1956	March 18–19	—N/a	—N/a	Blizzard	—N/a
1958	March 18–22	—N/a	—N/a	Storm	Category 3
1960	December 11–12	21.4 inches (54 cm)	966 hPa (28.5 inHg)	Blizzard	Category 2
1961	January 1–3	8 inches (20 cm) (Note: Freezing rain)	—N/a	Ice storm	—N/a
1963	October 25–30	48 inches (120 cm)	948 hPa (28.0 inHg) (Note: Hurricane Ginny caused a major snow event.)	Storm	—N/a
1966	January 27–31	103 inches (260 cm)	—N/a	Blizzard	Category 4
1967	January 26–27	23 inches (58 cm)	997 hPa (29.4 inHg)	Blizzard	Category 5
1969	February 8–10	—N/a	970 hPa (29 inHg)	Blizzard	Category 2
1969	March 5–8	—N/a	—N/a	Storm	—N/a
1969	December 25–28	—N/a	976 hPa (28.8 inHg)	Storm	—N/a
1971	March 3–5	—N/a	—N/a	Blizzard	—N/a
1973	December 16–17	1 inch (2.5 cm)	992 hPa (29.3 inHg)	Ice storm	—N/a
1975	January 9–12	27 inches (69 cm)	961 hPa (28.4 inHg)	Blizzard	Category 3
1976	February 2	56 inches (140 cm)	957 hPa (28.3 inHg)	Blizzard	—N/a
1977	January 28 – February 1	100 inches (250 cm)	—N/a	Blizzard	—N/a
1978	January 25–27	52 inches (130 cm)	955.5 hPa (28.22 inHg)	Blizzard	Category 5
1978	February 5–7	40 inches (100 cm)	—N/a	Blizzard	Category 5
1979	January 12–15	21 inches (53 cm)	—N/a	Blizzard	Category 4
1991	October 31 – November 3	37 inches (94 cm)	984 hPa (29.1 inHg)	Blizzard	Category 5
1992	January 2–4	—N/a	993 hPa (29.3 inHg)	Storm	Category 2
1992	December 10–12	48 inches (120 cm)	985 hPa (29.1 inHg)	Blizzard	Category 2
1993	March 12–15	69 inches (180 cm)	960 hPa (28 inHg)	Blizzard	Category 5
1995	February 2–6	20 inches (51 cm)	962 hPa (28.4 inHg)	Storm	Category 2
1996	January 6–10	48 inches (120 cm)	980 hPa (29 inHg)	Blizzard	Category 5
1997	March 31 – April 1	—N/a	979 hPa (28.9 inHg)	Blizzard	Category 2
1997	October 24–26	—N/a	—N/a	Storm	—N/a
1998	January 4–10	5 inches (13 cm)	—N/a	Ice storm	—N/a
1999	January 2–4	21.6 inches (55 cm)	—N/a	Storm	Category 4
1999	January 14–15	—N/a	—N/a	Ice storm	—N/a

== 21st century ==
=== 2000s ===
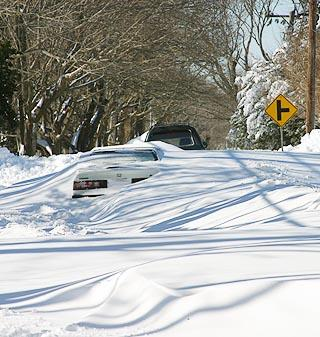
Abandoned cars in Yarmouth, Massachusetts after the North American blizzard of 2005

Year	Date	Maximum accumulation	Lowest pressure	Type	Category (RSI)
2000	January 18–30	30 inches (76 cm)	—N/a	Blizzard	Category 3
2000	October 20–30	24 inches (61 cm)	—N/a	Storm	—N/a
2000	December 27–31	30 inches (76 cm)	—N/a	Storm	Category 2
2002	January 29–31	3 inches (7.6 cm)	—N/a	Ice storm	Category 2
2002	February 7	—N/a	994 hPa (29.4 inHg)	Storm	—N/a
2002	December 4–5	—N/a	—N/a	Ice storm	—N/a
2003	February 14–19	44 inches (110 cm)	999 hPa (29.5 inHg)	Blizzard	Category 4
2003	December 5–8	35.6 inches (90 cm)	992 hPa (29.3 inHg)	Blizzard	Category 3
2004	December 21–24	39 inches (99 cm)	984 hPa (29.1 inHg)	Storm	Category 4
2004	December 24–28	18 inches (46 cm) (Note: This storm was significant for its snow impact on Texas.)	964 hPa (28.5 inHg)	Storm	—N/a
2005	January 20–23	40.5 inches (103 cm)	—N/a	Blizzard	Category 4
2005	December 14–16	0.75 inches (1.9 cm)	—N/a	Ice storm	—N/a
2006	February 11–13	30.2 inches (77 cm)	971 hPa (28.7 inHg)	Blizzard	Category 2
2006	October 11–13	24 inches (61 cm)	980 hPa (29 inHg)	Storm	—N/a
2006	November 20–24	5 inches (13 cm) (Note: While this nor'easter was not a major snow event, it was notable for the earliest snowfall ever recorded in Charleston, South Carolina and Savannah, Georgia.)	944 hPa (27.9 inHg)	Storm	—N/a
2006	November 26 – December 1	—N/a	—N/a	Storm	—N/a
2006	December 20–31	32 inches (81 cm)	—N/a	Blizzard	—N/a
2007	January 11–24	4 inches (10 cm)	961 hPa (28.4 inHg)	Ice storm	Category 2
2007	February 12–20	48 inches (120 cm)	970 hPa (29 inHg)	Blizzard	Category 3
2007	April 13–17	23 inches (58 cm)	969 hPa (28.6 inHg)	Storm	Category 1
2007	November 29 – December 4	14 inches (36 cm)	952 hPa (28.1 inHg)	Storm	—N/a
2007	November 29 – December 5	44 inches (110 cm)	976 hPa (28.8 inHg)	Storm	—N/a
2007	December 8–18	24 inches (61 cm)	974 hPa (28.8 inHg)	Various	—N/a
2008	January 3–11	—N/a	956 hPa (28.2 inHg)	Blizzard	—N/a
2008	March 6–10	28.5 inches (72 cm)	984 hPa (29.1 inHg)	Blizzard	—N/a
2008	December 11–12	—N/a	—N/a	Ice storm	—N/a
2008	December 19–25	—N/a	—N/a	Storm	—N/a
2009	January 25–30	2.5 inches (6.4 cm)	999 hPa (29.5 inHg)	Ice storm	—N/a
2009	October 13–20	23 inches (58 cm)	966 hPa (28.5 inHg)	Blizzard	—N/a
2009	December 16–20	26.3 inches (67 cm)	968 hPa (28.6 inHg)	Blizzard	Category 4
2009	December 22–28	40 inches (100 cm)	985 hPa (29.1 inHg)	Blizzard	Category 5

=== 2010s ===
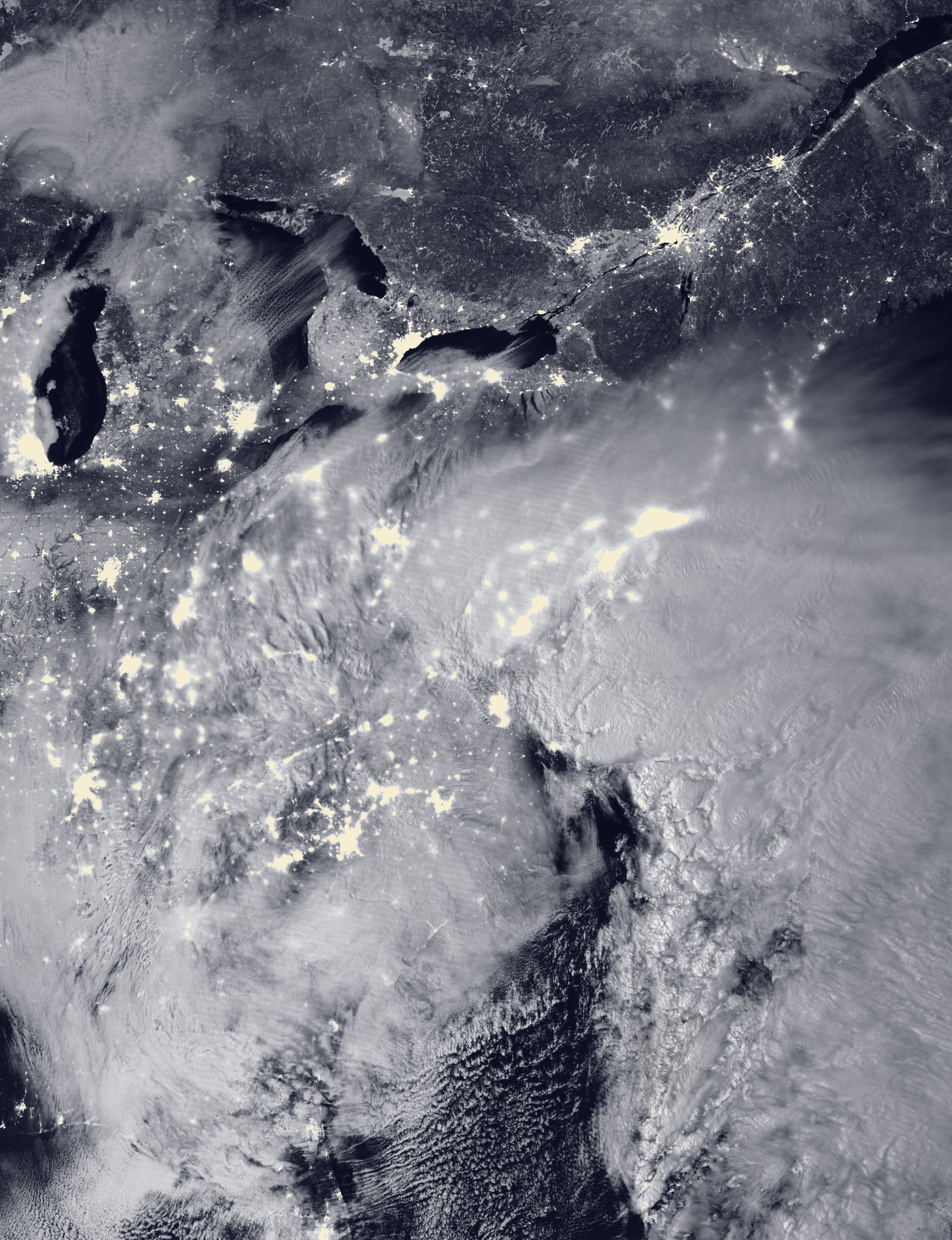
The blizzard as seen in moonlight early on January 23, 2016

Year	Date	Maximum accumulation	Lowest pressure	Type	Category (RSI)
2010	February 5–6	38.3 inches (97 cm)	978 hPa (28.9 inHg)	Blizzard	Category 4
2010	February 9–10	27.5 inches (70 cm)	969 hPa (28.6 inHg)	Blizzard	Category 2
2010	February 25–27	53 inches (130 cm)	972 hPa (28.7 inHg)	Blizzard	Category 4
2010	March 12–16	—N/a	993 hPa (29.3 inHg)	Storm	—N/a
2010	October 23–28	9 inches (23 cm)	955.2 hPa (28.21 inHg)	Blizzard	—N/a
2010	December 25–29	36 inches (91 cm)	960 hPa (28 inHg)	Blizzard	Category 2
2011	January 8–13	40.5 inches (103 cm)	—N/a	Blizzard	Category 2
2011	January 25–27	—N/a	—N/a	Blizzard	Category 1
2011	January 31 – February 2	27 inches (69 cm)	996 hPa (29.4 inHg)	Blizzard	Category 5
2011	October 28 – November 1	32 inches (81 cm)	971 hPa (28.7 inHg)	Blizzard	Category 1
2011	November 8–10	6.4 inches (16 cm)	943 hPa (27.8 inHg)	Blizzard	—N/a
2012	January 16–20	50 inches (130 cm)	992 hPa (29.3 inHg)	Blizzard	—N/a
2012	October 29 – November 2	36 inches (91 cm)	940 hPa (28 inHg) (Note: Hurricane Sandy caused a major snow event.)	Storm	—N/a
2012	November 7–10	13.5 inches (34 cm)	984 hPa (29.1 inHg)	Storm	Category 1
2012	December 17–22	15.2 inches (39 cm)	971 hPa (28.7 inHg)	Blizzard	Category 2
2012	December 25–28	27 inches (69 cm)	968 hPa (28.6 inHg)	Blizzard	Category 1
2013	February 7–18	40 inches (100 cm)	968 hPa (28.6 inHg)	Blizzard	Category 3
2013	March 1–10	36 inches (91 cm)	986 hPa (29.1 inHg)	Blizzard	Category 2
2013	October 3–5	58 inches (150 cm)	999 hPa (29.5 inHg)	Blizzard	Category 3
2013	November 22–27	48 inches (120 cm)	N/A	Storm	—N/a
2013	December 19–23	14 inches (36 cm)	997 hPa (29.4 inHg)	Storm	—N/a
2014	December 30 – January 6	23.8 inches (60 cm)	936 hPa (27.6 inHg)	Storm	Category 2
2014	January 19–24	18.3 inches (46 cm)	962 hPa (28.4 inHg)	Blizzard	Category 1
2014	January 27–31	10 inches (25 cm)	999 hPa (29.5 inHg)	Blizzard	Category 1
2014	February 11–24	27.5 inches (70 cm)	968 hPa (28.6 inHg)	Blizzard	Category 4
2014	November 7–13	—N/a	—N/a	Blizzard	—N/a
2014	November 13–21	88 inches (220 cm)	961 hPa (28.4 inHg)	Storm	—N/a
2015	January 23–30	36 inches (91 cm)	970 hPa (29 inHg)	Blizzard	Category 3
2015	January 31 – February 2	24.1 inches (61 cm)	978 hPa (28.9 inHg)	Blizzard	Category 3
2015	February 12–17	27.4 inches (70 cm)	958 hPa (28.3 inHg)	Blizzard	Category 1
2015	March 1–6	54.6 inches (139 cm)	993 hPa (29.3 inHg)	Blizzard	—N/a
2015	November 24–27	1.5 inches (3.8 cm)	994 hPa (29.4 inHg)	Ice storm	—N/a
2015	December 26–30	41 inches (100 cm)	989 hPa (29.2 inHg)	Blizzard	—N/a
2016	January 21–24	42 inches (110 cm)	983 hPa (29.0 inHg)	Blizzard	Category 5
2016	January 29 – February 7	41 inches (100 cm)	—N/a	Blizzard	Category 2
2016	February 7–10	11 inches (28 cm)	976 hPa (28.8 inHg)	Blizzard	—N/a
2016	February 23–24	17 inches (43 cm)	—N/a	Storm	—N/a
2016	March 21–25	32.5 inches (83 cm)	989 hPa (29.2 inHg)	Blizzard	—N/a
2016	April 15–23	51.3 inches (130 cm)	999 hPa (29.5 inHg)	Blizzard	—N/a
2017	January 4–8	56 inches (140 cm)	987 hPa (29.1 inHg)	Blizzard	Category 2
2017	January 7–13, 19–24; February 8–22	—N/a	—N/a	Storm	—N/a
2017	January 10–17	1 inch (2.5 cm)	999 hPa (29.5 inHg)	Ice storm	—N/a
2017	February 6–10	24 inches (61 cm)	969 hPa (28.6 inHg)	Blizzard	Category 1
2017	February 12–15	40 inches (100 cm)	968 hPa (28.6 inHg)	Blizzard	—N/a
2017	March 11–15	58 inches (150 cm)	974 hPa (28.8 inHg)	Blizzard	Category 4
2017	October 29–31	8.4 inches (21 cm)	975 hPa (28.8 inHg)	Storm	—N/a
2017	December 8-10	25 inches (64 cm)	—N/a	Storm	Category 2
2018	January 2–4	22 inches (56 cm)	949 hPa (28.0 inHg)	Blizzard	Category 1
2018	March 1–3	39.3 inches (100 cm)	974 hPa (28.8 inHg)	Blizzard	Category 1
2018	March 6–8	36 inches (91 cm)	986 hPa (29.1 inHg)	Blizzard	Category 1
2018	March 20–22	20.1 inches (51 cm)	988 hPa (29.2 inHg)	Storm	Category 2
2018	April 13–15	33 inches (84 cm)	985 hPa (29.1 inHg)	Storm	Category 4
2019	January 16–21	52 inches (130 cm)	—N/a	Storm	Category 1
2019	February 11–13	26.5 inches (67 cm)	—N/a	Blizzard	—N/a
2019	March 8–16	52 inches (130 cm)	968 hPa (28.6 inHg)	Blizzard	Category 1
2019	April 10–14	30 inches (76 cm)	982 hPa (29.0 inHg)	Blizzard	Category 3
2019	November 26 – December 3	—N/a	973 hPa (28.7 inHg)	Blizzard	Category 2

=== 2020s ===
A visible satellite loop of a snow-covered South Central U.S. in the aftermath of a winter storm on February 15, 2021

Year	Date	Maximum accumulation	Lowest pressure	Type	Category (RSI)
2020	January 15–18	37 inches (94 cm)	979 hPa (28.9 inHg)	Blizzard	—N/a
2020	February 2–5	23.5 inches (60 cm)	943 hPa (27.8 inHg) (Note: Storm Ciara caused a major snow event.)	Storm	—N/a
2020	February 9–13	13 inches (33 cm)	920 hPa (27 inHg) (Note: Storm Dennis caused a major snow event.)	Blizzard	—N/a
2020	October 29–30	6.5 inches (17 cm)	970 hPa (29 inHg) (Note: Hurricane Zeta caused a moderate snow event.)	Storm	—N/a
2020	November 29–December 2	24 inches (61 cm)	989 hPa (29.2 inHg)	Storm	—N/a
2020	December 4–6	18 inches (46 cm)	976 hPa (28.8 inHg)	Blizzard	—N/a
2020	December 14–18	44 inches (110 cm)	995 hPa (29.4 inHg)	Storm	Category 2
2020	December 30–January 2, 2021	24 inches (61 cm)	1,001 hPa (29.6 inHg)	Storm	Category 1
2021	January 25–February 3	36.1 inches (92 cm)	984 hPa (29.1 inHg)	Blizzard	Category 3
2021	February 6–8	14 inches (36 cm)	960 hPa (28 inHg)	Storm	—N/a
2021	February 13–17	26 inches (66 cm)	960 hPa (28 inHg)	Blizzard	Category 3
2021	February 15–20	24 inches (61 cm)	948 hPa (28.0 inHg)	Storm	Category 3
2021	March 10–16	52.5 inches (133 cm)	980 hPa (29 inHg)	Blizzard	Category 3
2021	March 16–17	6.2 inches (16 cm)	997 hPa (29.4 inHg)	Blizzard	—N/a
2021	April 15–17	14 inches (36 cm)	988 hPa (29.2 inHg)	Storm	—N/a
2022	January 3–4	15.5 inches (39 cm)	980 hPa (29 inHg)	Storm	—N/a
2022	January 14–17	27.5 inches (70 cm)	981 hPa (29.0 inHg)	Storm	Category 2
2022	January 28–30	30.4 inches (77 cm)	969 hPa (28.6 inHg)	Blizzard	Category 1
2022	February 1–5	37 inches (94 cm)	1,004 hPa (29.6 inHg)	Storm	Category 2
2022	February 22–26	12.2 inches (31 cm)	N/A	Storm	—N/a
2022	April 11-13	47 inches (120 cm)	983 hPa (29.0 inHg)	Storm	—N/a
2022	November 16–20	81.6 inches (207 cm)		Storm	—N/a
2022	December 21–26	56.5 inches (144 cm)	963 hPa (28.4 inHg)	Blizzard	Category 4
2023	January 31–February 2	N/A	1,016 hPa (30.0 inHg)	Storm	—N/a
2023	February 21–28	N/A	N/A	Blizzard	Category 2
2023	March 9–15	42.1 inches (107 cm)	N/A	Storm	Category 2
2024	January 7–10	21 inches (53 cm)	N/A	Storm	Category 1
2024	January 10–14	41.3 inches (105 cm)	N/A	Storm	—N/a
2024	January 12–18	49.5 inches (126 cm)	983 hPa (29.0 inHg)	Storm	Category 1
2024	February 10-13	15.7 inches (40 cm)	956 hPa (28.2 inHg)	Storm	—N/a
2024	November 19–21	20 inches (51 cm)	942 hPa (27.8 inHg)	Storm	—N/a
2025	January 3–7	20.5 inches (52 cm)	976 hPa (28.8 inHg)	Blizzard	Category 2
2025	January 8–11	14.3 inches (36 cm)	967 hPa (28.6 inHg)	Storm	Category 2
2025	January 18–20	16 inches (41 cm)	960 hPa (28 inHg)	Storm	—N/a
2025	January 20–22	13.4 inches (34 cm)	939 hPa (27.7 inHg)	Blizzard	Category 1
2025	October 12-13	N/A	962 hPa (28.4 inHg)	Storm	—N/a
2025	December 12–15	23.7 inches (60 cm)	938 hPa (27.7 inHg)	Storm	—N/a
2025	December 17–20	9.8 inches (25 cm)	945 hPa (27.9 inHg)	Storm	—N/a
2026	January 22–27	31 inches (79 cm)	958 hPa (28.3 inHg)	Storm	Category 3
2026	January 30–February 2	22.5 inches (57 cm)	964 hPa (28.5 inHg)	Storm	Category 2
2026	February 20–24	37.9 inches (96 cm)	965 hPa (28.5 inHg)	Blizzard	Category 3
2026	March 13–17	52 inches (130 cm)	944 hPa (27.9 inHg)	Blizzard	Category 5
2026	September 23–29	N/A	986 hPa (29.1 inHg)	Nor'easter	—N/a
2026	October 10–12	19 inches (48 cm)	996 hPa (29.4 inHg)	Storm	—N/a

== See also ==
- List of blizzards
- List of regional snowfall index category 5 winter storms
- List of regional snowfall index category 4 winter storms
- List of Northeast snowfall impact scale winter storms
- Winter storm naming in the United States
