= Mid-December 2007 North American winter storms =

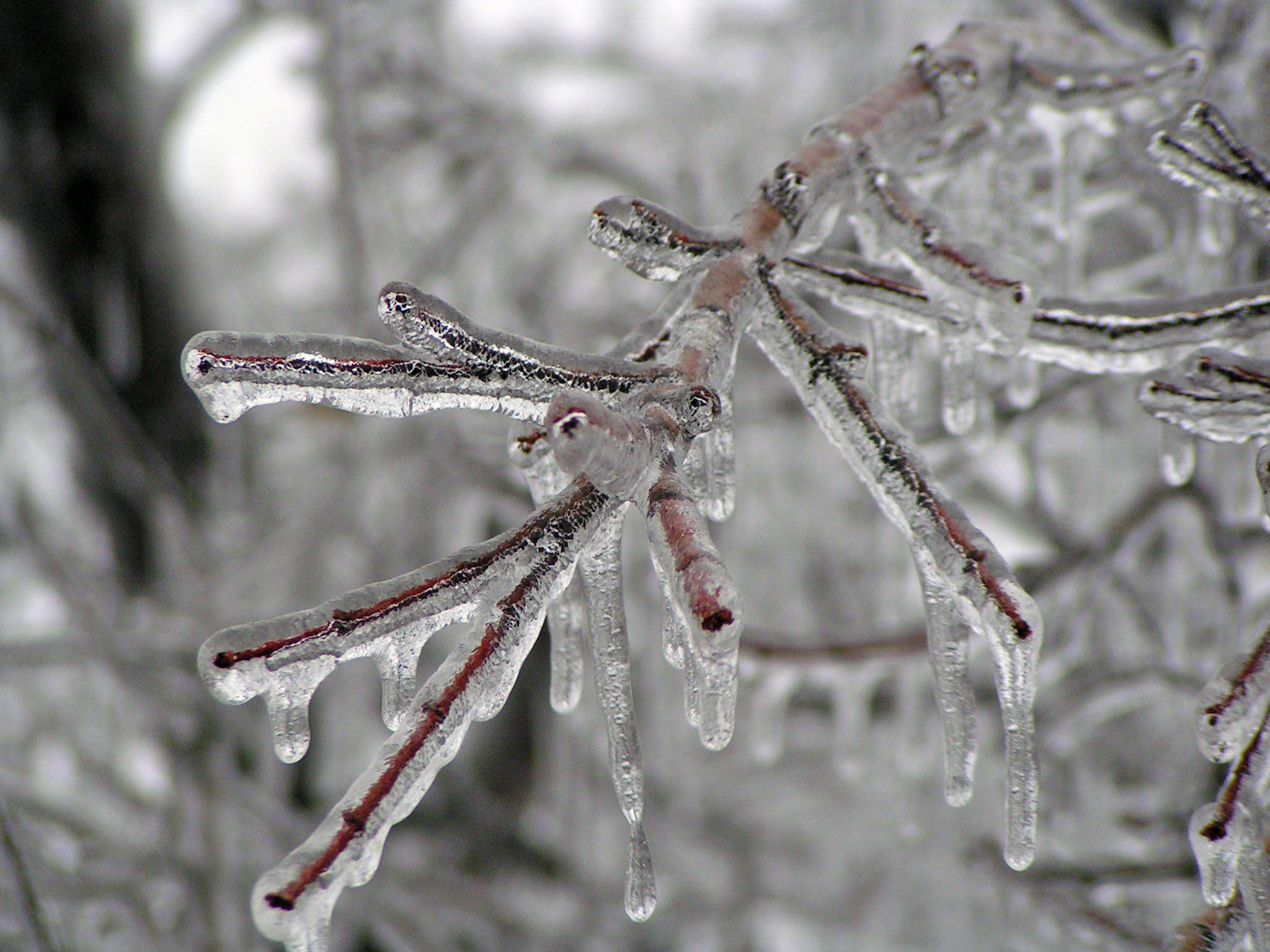
- Ice on a tree in Kansas City

Meteorological history
- Formed: December 8, 2007
- Dissipated: December 18, 2007

Winter storm
- Lowest pressure: 974 millibars (28.8 inHg)
- Max. snowfall: 24 inches (61 cm) of snow (Northern Park City, Utah), 1.5 inches (3.8 cm) of ice (Pittsburg, Kansas)

Tornado outbreak
- Tornadoes: 9
- Max. rating: EF2 tornado

Overall effects
- Fatalities: At least 64, including 38 from ice storm and 1 from tornadoes
- Damage: Unknown, $3.16 million in tornado outbreak
- Areas affected: Central and Eastern North America
- Power outages: >1.68 million
- Part of the winter storms of 2007–08

The Mid-December 2007 North American winter storms were a series of two winter storms that affected much of central and eastern North America, from December 8 to 18, 2007. The systems affected areas from Oklahoma to Newfoundland and Labrador with freezing rain, thunderstorms, sleet, snow, damaging winds, and blizzard-like conditions in various areas. The first two storms produced copious amounts of ice across the Midwestern United States and Great Plains from December 8 to 11, knocking out power to approximately 1.5 million customers from Oklahoma north to Iowa. The second storm moved northeast, producing heavy snow across New York and New England. A third storm was responsible for a major winter storm from Kansas to the Canadian Maritimes, bringing locally record-breaking snowfalls to Ontario, an icestorm across the Appalachians, and thunderstorms and 9 tornadoes to the Southeastern United States.

The ice storms were responsible for at least 22 deaths across three states. At least 25 additional deaths were blamed on the December 15–16 Midwest and Eastern snowstorm, and its aftermath across six US States and three Canadian provinces; 1 additional death was caused by the severe weather outbreak in the Southeast.

== Meteorological synopsis ==
Much of the affected areas were already hit by a significant winter storm during the weekend of December 1 and 2. Many areas had received close to three-quarters of an inch of ice from Nebraska to Illinois, causing tens of thousands of power outages and at least 16 deaths across nine states and the Canadian province of Quebec, the latter receiving a major snow storm.

Following that winter storm, a large dome of cold air penetrated the Midwest, following an Alberta clipper, which was responsible for major flooding across the Pacific Northwest and moderate snows from Alberta to Maryland. The first low-pressure system, which developed across the Southwest on December 8, produced light freezing rain throughout much of the Midwest and southern Ontario on December 9. A second stronger storm developed across the southwest on December 10 and produced significant snowfall in the higher elevations of Arizona near Flagstaff, as well as in Colorado.

Storm Ice Accumulations (Maximum By State, through 8:00 pm CST December 11, 2007)
Total	Location
1.50 in (3.8 cm)	Pittsburg, Kansas
1.50 in (3.8 cm)	Joplin, Missouri
1.25 in (3.2 cm)	Vinita, Oklahoma
1.00 in (2.5 cm)	Ottumwa, Iowa
0.75 in (1.9 cm)	Danbury, Nebraska
0.50 in (1.3 cm)	Spearman, Texas
0.50 in (1.3 cm)	Rensselaer, Indiana
0.30 in (0.8 cm)	Niskayuna, New York
0.25 in (0.6 cm)	Sparta, Illinois
0.25 in (0.6 cm)	Montpelier, Ohio
All totals are freezing rain only

The storm then proceeded to produce a significant swath of ice across much of the Central Plains. Both storms in total produced between a half-inch to an inch of ice from Oklahoma to Wisconsin, while 8 to 24 inches of snow (20–60 cm) fell over the mountains of Utah, the highest amount being reported in northern Park City; 6 to 12 inches (15 to 30 centimetres) fell over Colorado and New Mexico, while generally less than 6 inches fell on the northern side of the system from Nebraska to Quebec, although 10 inches (25 cm) fell in the Saguenay region of Quebec due to the orographic effect and Lake Saint-Jean. A mixture of snow, sleet, ice, and rain also fell across many of the affected areas. The main energy of the system responsible for the ice storm later moved east and affected portions of the Northeast and Middle Atlantic States with snow and rain on December 13, with the heaviest snow falling across southern and central New York and central New England. Portions of Massachusetts, Connecticut and New York received as much as 12 inches (30 cm) of snow from the storm, including 7 inches (18 cm) in Boston.

Another major winter storm developed on December 14, east of the Rockies and across the Southern States, and traveled across many of the same areas, bringing significant snows to areas that were affected by both ice storms. Portions of Kansas received over a foot (30 cm) of snow on top of the accumulated ice. The system moved across the Great Lakes region on December 15 and 16 and intensified while adding moisture from a developing coastal low as well as residual moisture from what was Tropical Storm Olga that affected most of the Antilles and Caribbean. Several areas in the Midwest and eastern North America received close to a foot of snow including Chicago, some areas of the Toronto and Detroit areas, Montreal, and Ottawa. Accumulations of as much as 20 inches (51 cm) fell across northern New England, northern New York, eastern Ontario from rural eastern Ottawa to Cornwall, and north of the Saint Lawrence River in the province of Quebec into the Charlevoix region. Thundersnow was even reported across portions of southern Ontario and Quebec. Widespread amounts of snow between 8 and 14 inches (20 and 36 centimetres) were reported across Ontario, Quebec, most of New England and the Canadian Maritimes as well as in several areas of the Midwest including Kansas and Missouri, while between a half-inch to an inch (13–25 mm) of ice fell across higher elevations in Maryland and Virginia with significant icing as well over West Virginia and Pennsylvania. This was accompanied by heavy rain between 2 and 4 inches (51 and 102 millimetres) south of the Mason–Dixon line towards the Carolinas and the Southeast, with significant rainfall across the Middle Atlantic Coast, coastal sections of Nova Scotia, and the Avalon Peninsula of Newfoundland and Labrador. Additionally, heavy thunderstorms developed across the Southern states near the Gulf of Mexico coast, where tornado watches were issued for portions of Alabama, Florida, Georgia, and South Carolina on December 15 with several tornadoes later confirmed. The storm finally exited off the coast into the Atlantic Ocean on December 18.

The series of storms that affected the Midwest and East are similar to those that took place during January 2007 as several storms traveled across the same areas, killing at least 85 across several states and Canadian provinces. It was also similar to (but much less severe than) the historic Ice Storm of 1998 which blanketed much of eastern Canada from Ontario to New Brunswick.

== December 8 to 11 Midwest ice storm ==
=== Fatalities ===
At least 38 people were killed by the storm including 27 in Oklahoma, four in Kansas, three in Missouri and one in Nebraska; most of the fatalities were from traffic accidents caused by the icy weather, including four people in a single accident on Interstate 40 west of Okemah, Oklahoma. Two people died from a falling tree branch and from hypothermia.

=== Power outages ===
Overall, nearly 1.5 million customers lost power in total. The storm caused the largest power outage in Oklahoma history, where more than 600,000 homes and businesses, accounting for approximately 40% of the population, lost power during the peak of the storm; 350,000 customers were without power in other states, including 100,000 in Missouri, 17,000 in Iowa, 25,000 in Kansas, with scattered power outages also reported in Nebraska and Illinois. It was predicted that it could take 7–10 days to restore power to everybody. The city of Jones, Oklahoma, was left with no electricity to feed high pressure water into the city, while most of its high school was heavily damaged due to a fire. Several other storm-related structural fires occurred, with one smoke-inhalation death from a storm-related fire in Tulsa. FEMA and the Army Corps of Engineers shipped generators and bottled water to Oklahoma, where some hospitals were running on backup generators.

=== States of emergency ===
Snowfall amounts Dec 8–11
City	Snowfall Amounts
Northern Park City, UT	24 in (61 cm)
Pagosa Springs, CO	11 in (27 cm)
Los Alamos, NM	7–11 in (17–27 cm)
Washburn, ME	10 in (25 cm)
Saguenay, QC	10 in (25 cm)
Boulder, CO	6–8 in (10–20 cm)
Cozad, NE	6 in (15 cm)
Ottawa, ON	5 in (12 cm)
All amounts are snowfall only

Kansas Governor Kathleen Sebelius declared a statewide state of emergency prior to the storm's arrival while President George W. Bush issued a similar state of emergency for the state of Oklahoma before declaring a federal emergency. The city of Norman was declared to be a disaster area by Mayor Cindy Rosenthal. Oklahoma Governor Brad Henry cut short a vacation to tour up the hardest hit areas by the storm including northwestern Oklahoma City and later signed a federal disaster declaration. It was reported that damage to utility equipment alone was estimated at over $30 million in seven counties alone including the Oklahoma City and Tulsa metropolitan areas. After the initial round of ice on Sunday, Governor Matt Blunt issued a state of emergency for parts of Missouri.

=== Cancellations ===
The storm, as did the previous storm, disrupted events scheduled by presidential hopefuls for the 2008 US presidential election including Republican Candidate Mike Huckabee as his plane was unable to land in western Iowa but did so in Omaha, Nebraska. An appearance by former President Bill Clinton on behalf of Hillary Clinton's campaign was also canceled due to the weather. One event scheduled by former North Carolina Senator and Democratic candidate John Edwards was also canceled.

Chicago O'Hare International Airport canceled at least 560 flights, while Tulsa International Airport was forced to halt flights on the 10th after losing power for 10 hours while nearly 100 flights were grounded at Kansas City International Airport. Ice forced schools to close from Oklahoma to upstate New York.

== Northeastern United States December 13 storm ==
Snowfall amounts Dec 13–14
City	Snowfall Amounts
Bloomingburg, NY	10.9 in (26 cm)
Boston, MA	10.5 in (26 cm)
Penn Yan, NY	10 in (25 cm)
Binghamton, NY	9.5 in (24 cm)
Waterbury, CT	8.4 in (21 cm)
Montrose, PA	8.3 cm (21 cm)
Emporium, PA	8 in (20 cm)
Goshen, NY	7.3 in (19 cm)
All amounts are snowfall only

As the system moved northeast towards New England and New York on December 13, several delays were reported across several airports while 200 flights were canceled at Newark International Airport and 450 at Boston Logan International Airport. Numerous accidents on several Interstate Highways were reported across Connecticut forcing at times the partial or complete closures of portions of certain highways. In Monroe County, New York, which includes the city of Rochester, the emergency dispatch center received 1,800 calls for collisions but no serious injuries were reported. During the worst of the storm double-trailer rigs and propane tankers were banned from Interstate 90 in western Massachusetts. There were no weather-related fatalities reported across the Northeast for this storm system.

Schools and government offices from Massachusetts to New Jersey and Pennsylvania were closed early or for all day, and locally some students were stranded for a few hours at various schools particularly in the Boston area where there was criticism over the management of the storm. In Providence, RI, students who had been dismissed early were stranded on school buses for up to eight hours. The storm did not affect professional sporting, as the National Hockey League game between the New Jersey Devils and the Boston Bruins went ahead as scheduled in Boston despite a game attendance of about 1500 at TD Banknorth Garden.

== December 15–16 storm ==
=== Impact and flight cancellations ===
Snowfall amounts Dec 15–16 storm
City	Snowfall Amounts
Ottawa, ON	33–50 cm (13–20 in) region 37 cm (15 in) Ottawa airport 33 cm (13 in) Gatineau airport
Quebec, QC	30–40 cm (12–16 in)
Burlington, VT	12–16 in (30–41 cm)
Syracuse, NY	12–14 in (30–36 cm)
Montreal, QC	30 cm (12 in)
Toronto, ON	18–35 cm (7.1–13.8 in) region 20 cm (8 in) Toronto airport 33 cm (13 in) Downtown Toronto
Chicago, IL	2–12 in (5.1–30.5 cm) region 3 inches (7.6 cm) O'Hare Airport
Detroit, MI – Windsor, ON	9 inches (23 cm)
Moncton, NB	23 cm (9.1 in)
Boston, MA	8 inches (20 cm)
St. Louis, MO	6–8 in (15–20 cm)
All amounts are snowfall only

Heavy snow up to one foot in total hampered recovery efforts across areas that were hit by the ice storm in Kansas as tens of thousands were still without power during the winter storm. In Chicago, more than expected snowfall along with fog and wind caused an additional 200 flight cancellations at O'Hare and Midway Airports. Numerous cancellations were reported in Buffalo, Toronto (nearly 300 flights in total), Ottawa Macdonald–Cartier International Airport (over 100 flights), Quebec City, Montreal (300 total flights), Boston (about 300 additional flights), Portland, Maine, and other major airports. A U.S. Airways plane carrying 31 passengers slid off a runway at an airport in Rhode Island without causing any injuries. At Cleveland-Hopkins International Airport, the NFL's Buffalo Bills airplane got stuck on a runway because of accumulating snow due to a Lake Erie snowsquall after their game against the Cleveland Browns so the team was forced to return to Buffalo by bus.

=== Snow records ===
In Ottawa, the 37 centimeters of snow that fell on December 16 broke a new 24-hour December snowfall record set on December 21, 1977, while it fell 3 centimeters short of the all-time one day snowfall record of 40.4 centimeters set on March 2, 1947, which was part of its worst all-time snowfall event of 73 centimeters set on March 2–3, 1947. It also brought its season snowfall total to 5 feet (150 cm) in just over 3 weeks, the same amount of the entire 2006–07 winter. The city would end up breaking a new all-time December snowfall that was previously set in 1970 with a total of just over 120 centimeters (3.9 feet) after additional snowfalls following the blizzard. In Toronto, the 26 centimeters that fell down was just 2 shy of the all-time 24-hour snowfall set on December 11, 1944, where 28 centimeters and a 2-day storm total of 57 centimeters and which it killed 21. In Boston, the weekend snowfall combined with those of December 14's storm surpass the total snowfall of 2006–07. The snowstorm event coupled with previous snow events on November 22 and December 3 was the third top weather story in Canada in 2007 according to Environment Canada after the ice melting over the Canadian Arctic and the British Columbia floods of December 3.

=== Damage and power outages ===
North America radar loop of the December 16 winter storm

In Brighton, Massachusetts, the heavy snows and rains caused the roof of a pharmacy to collapse under the heavy weight of the snow but only minor injuries were reported because of falling debris. Several areas across New York, Michigan and Indiana declared snow emergencies.

Heavy ice across the Poconos and Pennsylvania was responsible for the collapse of two television towers at Penobscot Mountain in Luzerne County near Scranton that knocked out transmission for several nearby television stations. Strong winds in excess of 40 mph (64 km/h) also caused localized damage to roofs, power lines and trees across several states including Pennsylvania, Massachusetts and Rhode Island. Strong winds in excess of 100 km/h was also reported across much of Eastern Canada, particularly in Cape Breton, the shore of the Gulf of Saint Lawrence and most of the island of Newfoundland where a peak gust of 181 km/h was reported in the Wreckhouse region with other gusts measuring over 120 km/h in Bonavista, Port-aux-Basques and Long Pond. In Matane, Quebec strong winds along the Saint Lawrence River caused storm surge waves that crashed ashore and flooded over 10 homes. Over 160,000 customers in Pennsylvania lost power due to ice and sleet, 20 000 in the Canadian Maritimes due to strong winds while scattered power outages were reported in Illinois, Vermont, Ontario and Quebec. In eastern Quebec, 3 000 customers were left without power while roads were mostly inaccessible to maintenance and Hydro-Québec crews because of near zero visibility and heavy snow accumulations.

=== Ground travel impact ===
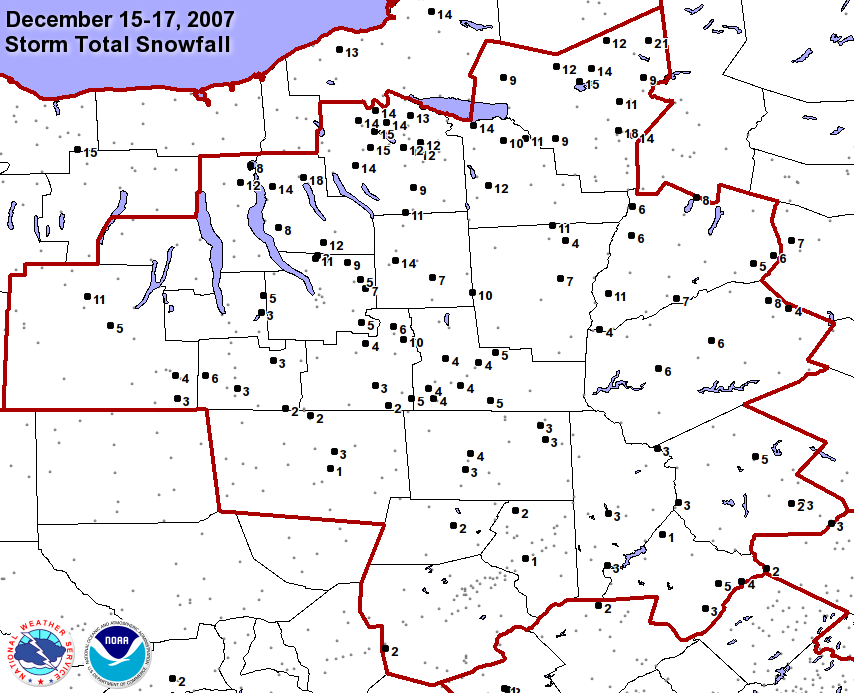
Snowfall Map for December 16 storm across central New York

Hundreds of accidents (including two fatal ones) were reported by Ontario Provincial Police by the Sûreté du Québec across Ontario, Quebec and across several US States including a pile-up that involved at least seven tractor-trailers on Highway 401 near Cornwall which temporarily closed the road. A second pile-up on Highway 401 near Kingston caused a rig to leaked over 300 liters of fuel into a creek. Another pile-up involving a tractor-trailer was reported on Autoroute 40 west of Montreal forcing the shutdown of it as the trailer overturned and spilled kerosene on the roadway. Autoroutes 20 and 440 and Highways 132, 138 and 175 north and east of Quebec City were shut down due to heavy and blowing snow.

=== Cancellations ===
The storm also led to the postponement of several events and concerts across various areas including numerous church services as well as a winter commencement ceremony scheduled at both the University of Connecticut and University of Michigan where undergraduate students were expected to receive their diplomas. The Canadian Broadcasting Corporation also postponed a fund-raising concert in Summerside, Prince Edward Island. Several schools across the Northeastern United States, Quebec, Ontario and the Maritimes were closed and mornings sessions at Université Laval were also suspended.

=== Professional sports impact ===
The storm also had impact in professional sports action as National Football League Games between the New England Patriots and the New York Jets in Foxborough, Massachusetts, the Cleveland Browns and the Buffalo Bills in Cleveland and the Pittsburgh Steelers and Jacksonville Jaguars in Pittsburgh were played in difficult conditions with snow, sleet and strong winds. At Giants Stadium in East Rutherford, New Jersey, where the New York Giants and Washington Redskins played the Sunday Night match-up, strong winds collapsed a fabric dome used for hospitality events before and after games but no one was injured on the incident. In the National Basketball Association game between the Boston Celtics and the Toronto Raptors, the game was delayed due to a leak coming the roof of Toronto's Air Canada Centre during the peak of the snowstorm while many seats were empty despite an announced sellout for the game.

=== Fatalities ===
The snow storm and its aftermath were responsible for at least 25 fatalities across six states and three Canadian provinces including five in Indiana including four in a single crash, two in Kansas (both in Montgomery County), one in Wisconsin, seven in Michigan, three in Massachusetts, one in Maine three in Ontario, one in Nova Scotia and two in Quebec Most fatalities were as a result of motor vehicle accidents, but deaths due to heart-attacks while shoveling and being buried by snow were also reported.

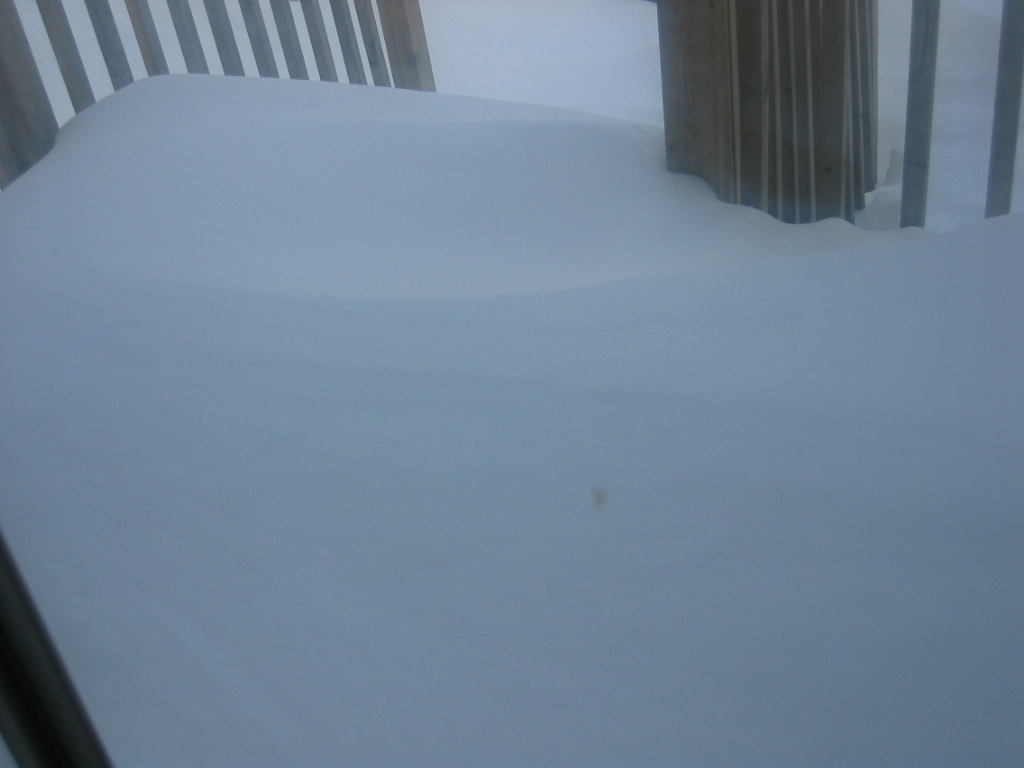
Snowdrifts covering deck outside a front door in Southern Ontario.

=== Southeastern tornado event ===
In addition to producing a severe winter storm, the same storm system was responsible for a small tornado outbreak across the southeast which was produced by a cold front associated with the storm and residual moisture from Tropical Storm Olga which killed 35 across Haiti and the Dominican Republic. 12 tornadoes were reported with an EF2 being the strongest one confirmed in the Lothair, Georgia area. Another tornado in Georgia was responsible for the death of a truck driver on Interstate 75 when the strong winds overturned his tractor-trailer. Significant damage was reported in several areas from several different tornadoes including one that damaged the Pasco County Jail in Florida.

==== Confirmed tornadoes ====
Confirmed tornadoes by Enhanced Fujita rating
EFU	EF0	EF1	EF2	EF3	EF4	EF5	Total
0	4	4	1	0	0	0	9

=== December 15 event ===
List of confirmed tornadoes –Saturday, December 15, 2007 (Note: All dates are based on the local time zone where the tornado touched down; however, all times are in Coordinated Universal Time for consistency.)
EF#	Location	County / Parish	State	Start Coord.	Time (UTC)	Path length	Max width	Summary
EF0	Warren	Tyler	TX	30.6101°N 94.411°W	13:39–13:40	0.25 mi (0.40 km)	50 yd (46 m)	A brief tornado uprooted pine trees, damaged sheet metal roofing and blew a fence down.
EF0	W of Blakely	Early	GA	31.38°N 85.0348°W	22:55–23:00	3.83 mi (6.16 km)	75 yd (69 m)	A tornado destroyed an old shed store and an outbuilding and damaged a mobile home.
EF0	WNW of Sylvester to Isabella	Worth	GA	31.5522°N 83.9128°W	02:03–02:06	3.9 mi (6.3 km)	75 yd (69 m)	A tornado destroyed a peanut warehouse and damaged 29 homes.
EF1	Ashburn	Turner	GA	31.6898°N 83.682°W	02:20–02:22	3.5 mi (5.6 km)	125 yd (114 m)	1 death - A tornado destroyed 4 mobile homes and damaged 39 homes. A semi-truck traveling on I-75 was blown off the road and the driver was killed.
EF1	W of Owensboro	Wilcox	GA	31.87°N 83.4641°W	02:30–02:31	0.5 mi (0.80 km)	100 yd (91 m)	A brief tornado tore the roof off an old dairy shed and destroyed a cinder block
EF0	ENE of Jay Bird Springs	Dodge	GA	32.1577°N 82.921°W	03:18–03:19	0.5 mi (0.80 km)	25 yd (23 m)	One mobile home was damaged and numerous trees and power lines were knocked down.
EF2	Lothair	Treutlen	GA	32.3398°N 82.6621°W	03:41–03:47	3.5 mi (5.6 km)	200 yd (180 m)	A strong tornado touched down in a heavily forested area. Significant tree damage was noted within the forested area as a result of the tornado. The tornado then strengthened as it moved northeast and reached the town of Lothair where a fire department building was destroyed. A mobile home northeast of Lothair, was completely destroyed by the tornado and another home was moved off its foundation. Right before the tornado lifted, it ripped a carport off a home and threw it approximately 50 yd (46 m) across the street.

=== December 16 event ===
List of confirmed tornadoes –Sunday, December 16, 2007
EF#	Location	County / Parish	State	Start Coord.	Time (UTC)	Path length	Max width	Summary
EF1	SSE of Hague	Alachua	FL	29.73°N 82.41°W	07:45–07:47	0.75 mi (1.21 km)	200 yd (180 m)	A brief tornado downed numerous pine trees and a few were uprooted. A portion of a masonry brick wall on a small farm outbuilding was knocked over and the metal roof was ripped off and strewn across a field. A farm truck was flipped on its side near the outbuilding. Another house had a damaged carport, minor wall damage, a toppled TV antenna mast and many of the roof shingles were stripped.
EF1	NNW of Land o' Lakes	Pasco	FL	28.3129°N 82.509°W	10:20–10:27	3.2 mi (5.1 km)	100 yd (91 m)	A housing annex at the county jail was destroyed. There was also roof damage to a fire station, four vehicles were flipped and there were numerous trees and power poles downed.

== See also ==
- January 2007 North American ice storm
- Global storm activity of 2007
- Tornadoes of 2007
