= December 2008 North American snowstorms =

Weather event in Canada and the United States

The December 2008 North American snowstorms were a series of snowstorms that struck across Canada and the US. The snowstorms caused snow to fall across Canada and many parts of the United States, and broke records for the amount of snow accumulated in many cities on Christmas Day.

== Canada ==
The snowstorms caused Canada to have the first "nationwide" white Christmas since 1971.

=== British Columbia ===
==== Vancouver ====
The series of snowstorms broke a 44-year-old record for the snowiest Christmas ever, with up to 28 inches (71 cm) of snow accumulated in some parts of the South Coast. It was the first "official" white Christmas in Vancouver since 1998. In fact, Vancouver would be the Canadian city with the greatest snow depth for the Christmas Day of 2008. Vancouver experienced many snowfalls including snowstorms on December 21 and on the 24th, breaking daily snowfall records.

Vancouver International Airport recorded 22.4 centimeters (9 in) and 26.8 centimeters (11 in) on the 21st and on the 24th respectively. Higher elevations and cities northeast of Vancouver, such as Coquitlam, received over 30 centimeters (12 in) of snow with each of the storms. The snow, however, was also accompanied by frigid temperatures such as the −15.2 °C (5 °F) on the 20th, which broke the daily low temperature record at the airport which is situated at sea level. It happened to be the coldest temperature recorded in December for 40 years; dating back to the −17.8 °C (0 °F) on the 29th in 1968.

Another snowstorm on the 26th brought an additional 15.6 centimeters (6 in) of snow at the airport, which led to some roof collapses. When recorded, the monthly snowfall for December stood at an astonishing near 90 centimeters (35 in) .

==== Fernie ====
Two avalanches occurred near Fernie, British Columbia, as a result of the snowstorms that dumped approximately 27 inches (69 cm) in the region. The first avalanche buried a group of seven men, and a second avalanche buried a group of four that were trying to help the first group. Three men pulled themselves out of the snow, but eight died in the avalanches.

=== Ontario ===
Areas of Southern Ontario saw above average snowfall throughout much of December 2008. Areas like Toronto saw over 60 cm (24 in) in December and near Lake Huron and Georgian Bay snowfall amounts were in excess of 100+cm. Many areas near London, Ontario, and near the shorelines of Lake Huron had seen above average snowfall as well.

=== Quebec ===
Many areas in Quebec received more than 15 centimeters (5.9 in) of snow during December 20–21, 2008. Visibility was reported as zero in parts the Laurentides and Lanaudière regions, which contributed to accidents on various highways in the Montreal metropolitan area. Opération Nez rouge services in Montreal were also interrupted during the snowfall.

== United States ==
=== Illinois ===
==== Chicago ====
Thick fog caused by the storms were responsible for flight cancellations in both the Chicago Midway Airport and the US's second busiest airport, O'Hare International Airport. On December 26, hundreds of flights were canceled. Operations began to return to normal the following day, though over a hundred flights were still canceled.

=== Oregon ===
==== Portland ====
The snowstorms were responsible for the greatest December snowfall in Portland, Oregon, in 40 years (the snowiest December in Portland was 1884, with more than 31 inches (79 cm) of snow). The City of Portland reported spending an estimated $2.17 million on snow removal, deicing of roads, and employee overtime due to the record snowfall.

Tri-Met suspended two-thirds of its bus lines. Hundreds of flights arriving and departing from Portland International Airport were canceled, leaving passengers and luggage stranded. Garbage services, privately run in the Portland area, were also canceled for over two weeks.

=== Washington ===
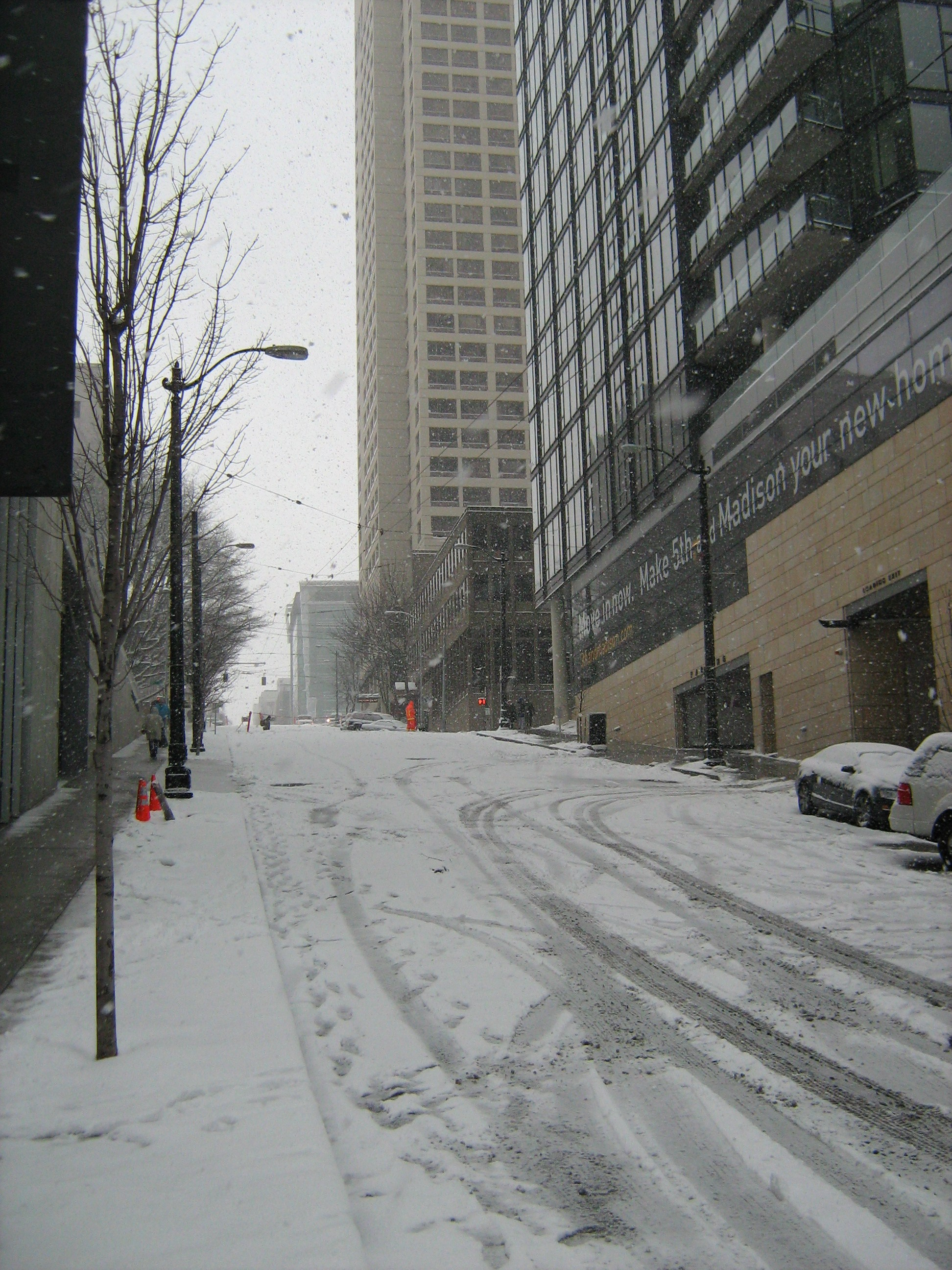
A snowy hill in downtown Seattle in December 2008.

==== Seattle ====
The winter weather greatly affected the Seattle area, where snow brought the city to a standstill and temperatures reached record lows. Many holiday travelers were unable to reach their destinations when Greyhound canceled bus service, airlines canceled flights at Seattle–Tacoma International Airport, and Amtrak shut down passenger service between Eugene, Oregon, and Vancouver, British Columbia.

The city of Seattle was criticized over its response to the snowfall. Mayor Greg Nickels initially gave the city a "B" for its response to the snowstorm, but the director of the Department of Transportation admitted the city should have done things differently. The Seattle Department of Transportation did not use salt on the icy roads, opting instead to put sand and a chemical de-icer on the roads. The snowplows used by the city did not clear the roads entirely of snow, instead creating a hard snow-packed surface; this was done to minimize damage to the roads. The mayor later stated the city would use salt during future snowstorms, but the heavy criticism may have contributed to incumbent Mayor Nickels coming in third place in the next primary election.

=== Las Vegas ===
A deep, upper-level trough had become established over the western United States during the weekend of December 13–14, 2008. Reanalysis data obtained online from Penn State University shows 700 mb temperatures across the area dropped to between −10 °C (14 °F) and −12 °C (10 °F) across southern Nevada by 06Z on December 14 and remained there through 12Z on December 17. An upper-level low moved southward along the West Coast of the United States, reaching the coast of southern California by 06Z on December 17. The low moved southeastward through the base of the upper-level trough axis and by the morning of December 17 was located along the coast of southern California. By 12Z on December 17, the low was accompanied by a 120+ knot jet stream that was located across the Mojave Desert (Figure 1). As the low approached southern California, the Mojave Desert was located under the left front quadrant of the jet, an area of typically favorable for lift. An area of diffluence, associated with this jet, was noted over southern California and western Arizona ahead of the upper low around 00Z on December 18, which also helped to further enhance lift across the area.

As a southwesterly flow aloft pushed moist air over the Mojave Desert, surface analysis indicated a north to northeast pressure gradient was also present in this area due to high pressure centered over eastern Utah. The 12Z sounding from Desert Rock (KDRA) indicated low-level northeasterly flow was present up through 850 mb with primarily southwesterly flow above that level (Figure 2). Between 12Z on December 17 and 00Z on December 18, a plume of subtropical moisture accompanied by precipitable water values of 0.30 to 0.50 of an inch was streaming northeastward toward the Mojave Desert. By 18Z on December 17, the jet stream had strengthened to 140 knots over Arizona, which placed southern Nevada near the left rear quadrant of the jet. Typically, the left rear quadrant of the jet corresponds to an area of subsidence, but in this case the curvature effects of the jet resulted in additional vertical motion in this quadrant. The upper low by then had moved towards the coast of southern California, with a distinct area of maximum Positive Vorticity Advection (PVA) at 500 mb having moved inland across the Mojave Desert (Figure 3).

Snow and a mix of snow and rain began to fall in the Las Vegas Valley shortly before 20Z on December 17. Radiosonde data from Desert Rock depicted warm advection took place between 12Z on December 17 and 00Z on December 18 with temperatures at 700 mb rising from −12 °C (10 °F) to −8 °C (18 °F) during that period. By around 02Z on December 18, precipitation generally became more intermittent as the area of maximum PVA had moved away from the area. Rain or a mixture of rain and snow tapered off between 05Z and 08Z on December 18 as warmer air finally infiltrated the lower levels and the upper low moved northeast over the Mojave Desert. Snow levels and amounts varied tremendously across the Las Vegas Valley with the greatest amounts located in the southeastern portion of the valley (Figures 4 and 5). Officially 3.6 inches of snow fell at the National Weather Service Office, which is located 2 miles southwest of McCarran International Airport. Generally 3 to 6 inches fell across the southern half of the valley. A maximum of 10 inches of snow was measured at the residence of a National Weather Service employee in southeast Henderson, near Railroad Pass, at an elevation of just under 2400 feet. The Henderson Executive Airport, located at an elevation of 2464 feet, in the southwestern part of Henderson received 8 inches. Snow amounts were highly variable along the famous Las Vegas Strip with the heaviest amounts on the southern end. At the “Welcome to Fabulous Las Vegas” sign on the far south end 1.7 inches of snow was measured while central and northern parts of The Strip saw snow barely coat some grassy surfaces and a few rooftops and metal objects at best. This corresponded well to a sharp-cut off noted overall across the center of the valley, where snow amounts decreased markedly. Across the northern half of the valley, snow levels were about 500 feet higher thus resulting in little to no snow accumulating here.

== See also ==
- Global storm activity of 2008
- Hanukkah Eve windstorm of 2006
- Great Coastal Gale of 2007
- Snowstorm
