= December 13–15, 2025 North American winter storm =

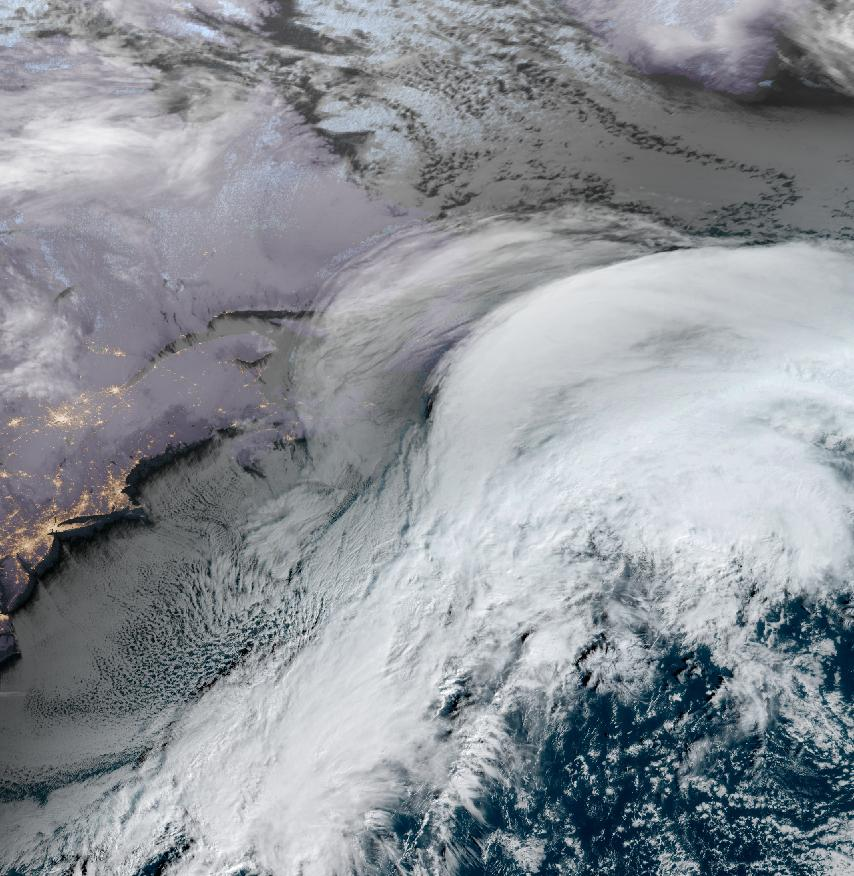
- Satellite image of the winter storm rapidly intensifying near the Northeastern United States and affecting Atlantic Canada at 12:50 UTC (7:50 a.m. EST) early on December 15

Meteorological history
- Formed: December 12, 2025
- Exited land: December 15, 2025
- Dissipated: December 19, 2025

Winter storm
- Highest winds: 90 mph (150 km/h) (1-minute sustained winds)
- Highest gusts: 102 mph (164 km/h) in Cape Race, Newfoundland
- Lowest pressure: 938 mbar (hPa); 27.70 inHg
- Max. snowfall: Snowfall – 23.7 in (60 cm) near Perrysburg, New York

Overall effects
- Fatalities: 6 total
- Injuries: 27
- Damage: Unknown
- Areas affected: Northern Great Plains, Ohio Valley, Northeastern United States, New England, Atlantic Canada
- Power outages: >64,100
- Part of the 2025–26 North American winter

From December 13 to 15, 2025, a fast-moving but disruptive winter storm impacted North America and brought the heaviest snowfall accumulations to areas near and within the cities of Philadelphia and New York City since 2022. The system originated near the Canada–United States border on December 12 as a disturbance along an arctic front that was quickly moving southeastwards towards the Great Plains. After dropping a wide swath of moderate snowfall stretching from the state of North Dakota to Ohio the following day, the system eventually redeveloped off the coast of the Delmarva Peninsula overnight as a coastal low on December 13–14, bringing widespread snowfall accumulations of 6–12 inches (15–30 cm) across the Mid-Atlantic and New England states, ending by the afternoon. The storm proceeded to explosively deepen afterwards and strike Atlantic Canada with near-blizzard conditions on December 15, causing severe impacts there. The winter storm eventually moved out into the North Atlantic, gradually weakening before dissipating on December 19.

A large swath of winter weather advisories, including winter storm warnings, were issued from Montana to New Jersey; the latter of which was the first such warning issued for the central part of the state in three years. Multiple disruptions to travel occurred across the affected regions, including at least 1,000 delayed flights and well over 100 cancellations at airports. The storm was responsible for at least 6 deaths, primarily as a result of weather-related car crashes, and at least 41,000 people in the U.S. were estimated to have lost power from the winter storm. The provinces of Atlantic Canada and Newfoundland saw strong hurricane-force wind gusts in conjunction with the heavy snowfall, some of which reached as high as 90–100 mph (140–160 km/h), with heavy snowfall accumulations peaking at 18 inches (46 cm). In both the U.S. and Canada, a combined total of 64,100 people were estimated to have lost power due to the storm. Following the departure of the winter storm, very cold temperatures settled into most of the eastern U.S. in its aftermath.

== Meteorological history ==
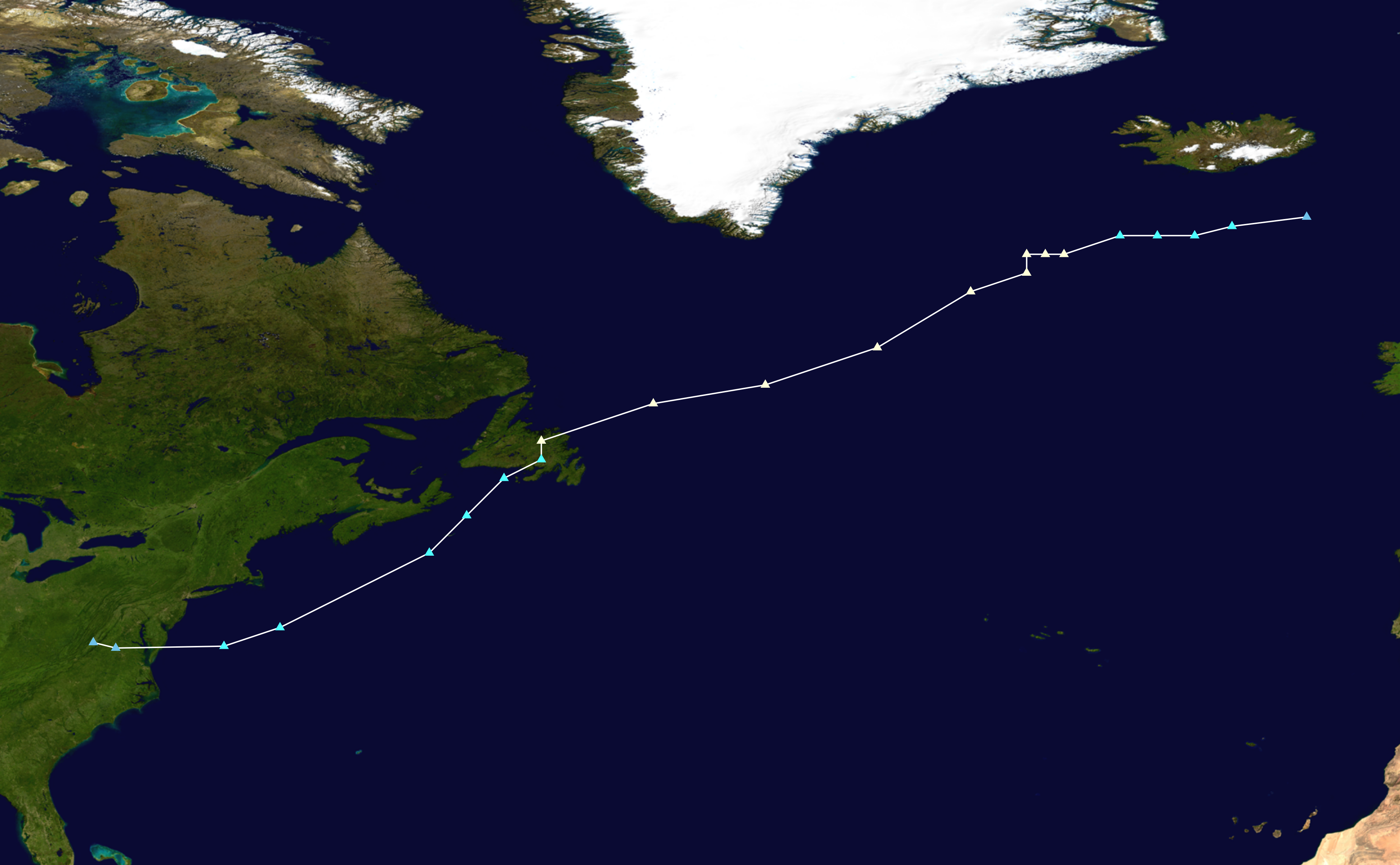
Map plotting the storm's track and intensity, according to the Saffir–Simpson scale Map key Saffir–Simpson scale Tropical depression (≤38 mph, ≤62 km/h) Tropical storm (39–73 mph, 63–118 km/h) Category 1 (74–95 mph, 119–153 km/h) Category 2 (96–110 mph, 154–177 km/h) Category 3 (111–129 mph, 178–208 km/h) Category 4 (130–156 mph, 209–251 km/h) Category 5 (≥157 mph, ≥252 km/h) Unknown Storm type Tropical cyclone Subtropical cyclone Extratropical cyclone, remnant low, tropical disturbance, or monsoon depression

A stationary front first developed late on December 12 near the Canada–United States border which led to precipitation forming along the periphery of the front; very cold temperatures allowed it to remain as snow. The disturbance moved at a fast rate as a result of traveling along the polar jet stream, the strength of which the Weather Prediction Center (WPC) estimated was in excess of 140 kn (160 mph; 260 km/h) in the upper levels of the atmosphere. Frontogenesis resulted in heavier snowbands developing across localized regions. By the afternoon of December 13, the winter storm was over the Ohio Valley. As the initial disturbance, along an anafront, tracked eastwards, it began to redevelop as a separate area of low pressure off the Delmarva Peninsula by 03:00 UTC on December 14; snowfall had already spread into the Mid-Atlantic states by this point.

Initially weak, the storm then began rapidly deepening, with the pressure dropping from 1,015 mb (30.0 inHg) to 994 mb (29.4 inHg) in a day from December 14–15. As it accelerated eastwards away from the U.S. and snowfall ended after producing snowfall rates of 1–2 inches (2.5–5.1 cm) an hour there, explosive cyclogenesis occurred afterwards as the storm struck Atlantic Canada as a hurricane force-low with near-blizzard conditions a result, with the pressure dropping to a minimum of 938 mb (27.7 inHg) at 06:00 UTC on December 16, a 50 millibars (1.5 inHg) drop in just a day. By the following day, steady weakening began as it pulled away from North America as a whole, until eventually being absorbed into another system near the United Kingdom on December 19.

== Preparations and impact ==
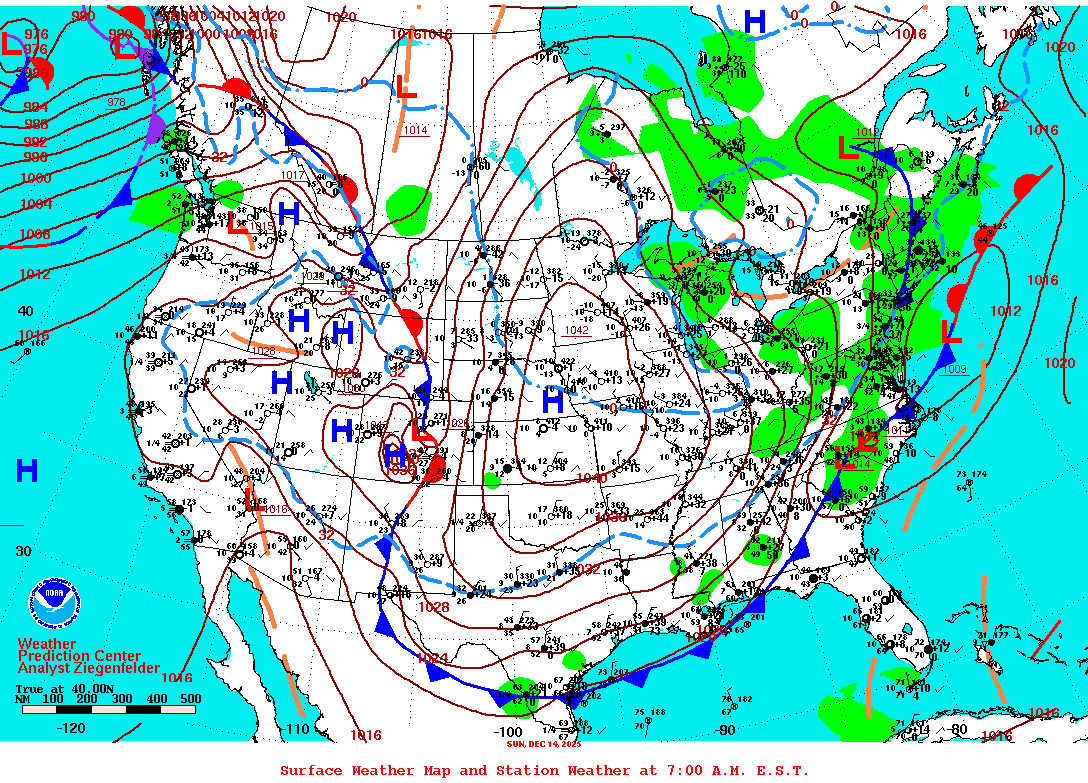
Surface weather map of the winter storm moving off the Northeastern United States coastline on December 14

=== United States ===
In total, roughly 41,100 people across Pennsylvania, New Jersey, New York, and Ohio were estimated to have lost power. Over 1,000 flights were delayed and over 100 were cancelled across the United States.

==== Midwest and Ohio Valley ====
Light snow and freezing drizzle led to slippery roads on the morning of December 12. The Minnesota State Patrol reported 128 crashes, with 14 causing injuries, as well as 5 spin-outs and 89 going off the road by 12 P.M. A part of Interstate 80 was closed in Iowa due to multiple crashes that resulted in several injuries on December 13. Iowa State Patrol responded to 206 calls and covered 88 crashes. A fatality as well as 13 injuries occurred.

Snowfall led to dangerous conditions on roads in Illinois. I-55 was closed near Springfield, Illinois due to a multi-vehicle crash that in a fatality. Another multi-vehicle crash resulted in a death on I-57 due to slick conditions. In Ohio, a daily record snowfall of 5.4 in (14 cm) occurred in Columbus. Cold weather advisories were issued for December 15 for central Ohio. Temperatures at 6:30 A.M in John Glenn International Airport were −22 °F (−30 °C). Schools were cancelled or delayed in central Ohio, Kentucky, and West Virginia on December 15. A rideshare rolled over a man in Louisville, Kentucky on a slippery road, killing him. Indiana State Police responded to over 315 crashes and slide-offs as well as helped 81 stranded motorists since the morning of December 13.

==== Northeastern United States ====
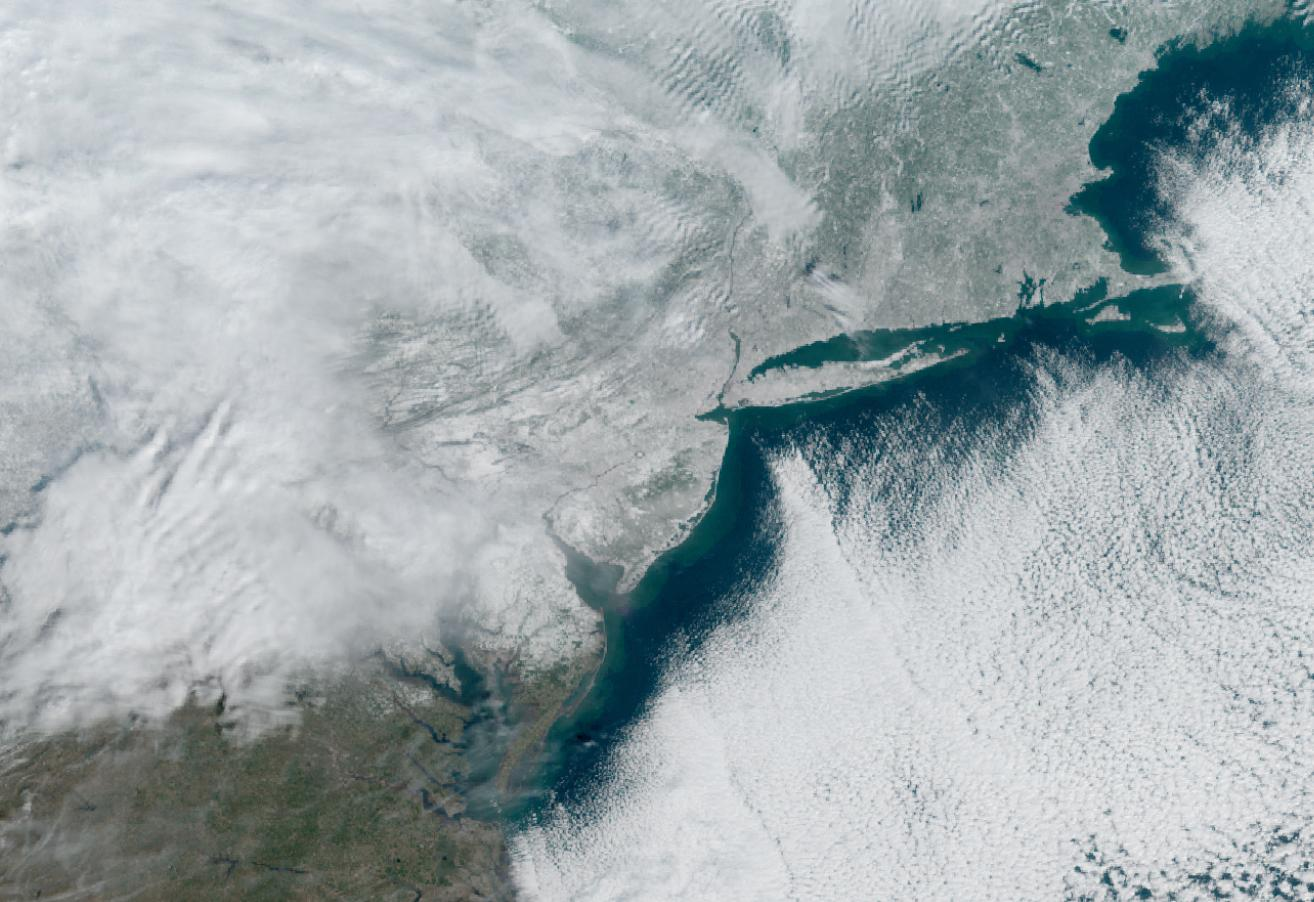
Snow cover over the Northeast after the winter storm on December 15

The winter storm left at least 2,000 people without power in Mercer County, New Jersey on December 14. Governor Phil Murphy advised residents to travel with extreme caution. Speed limits on certain interstates in Pennsylvania were reduced. Heavy snowfall totals ranged from 6–8 inches (15–20 cm) across a majority of the central portion of the state, with a maximum of 8.6 in (22 cm) reported in Howell Township. Schools in New Jersey and Pennsylvania saw closures and delays on December 15.

In New York City, the 1, A and R lines experienced delays. Central Park recorded their earliest in-season inch of snow since 2019, the total accumulation was 2.7 in (6.9 cm). Ground stops were implemented at both John F. Kennedy International Airport and Philadelphia International Airport. John F. Kennedy International Airport set a daily snowfall record of 4.6 inches (12 cm). Islip also reported a daily record of 5.8 in (15 cm), which was the snowiest day at the site since January 29, 2022. Perrysburg, New York, saw 23.7 inches (60 cm) of snow. A 20-year-old man was killed in a fatal crash occurred on the Southern State Parkway on Long Island early on the morning of December 14 after crashing into a tree, attributed to the wintry weather. Another fatality was reported due to a crash on Merrick Road. On December 15, schools had closures or delays in New York.

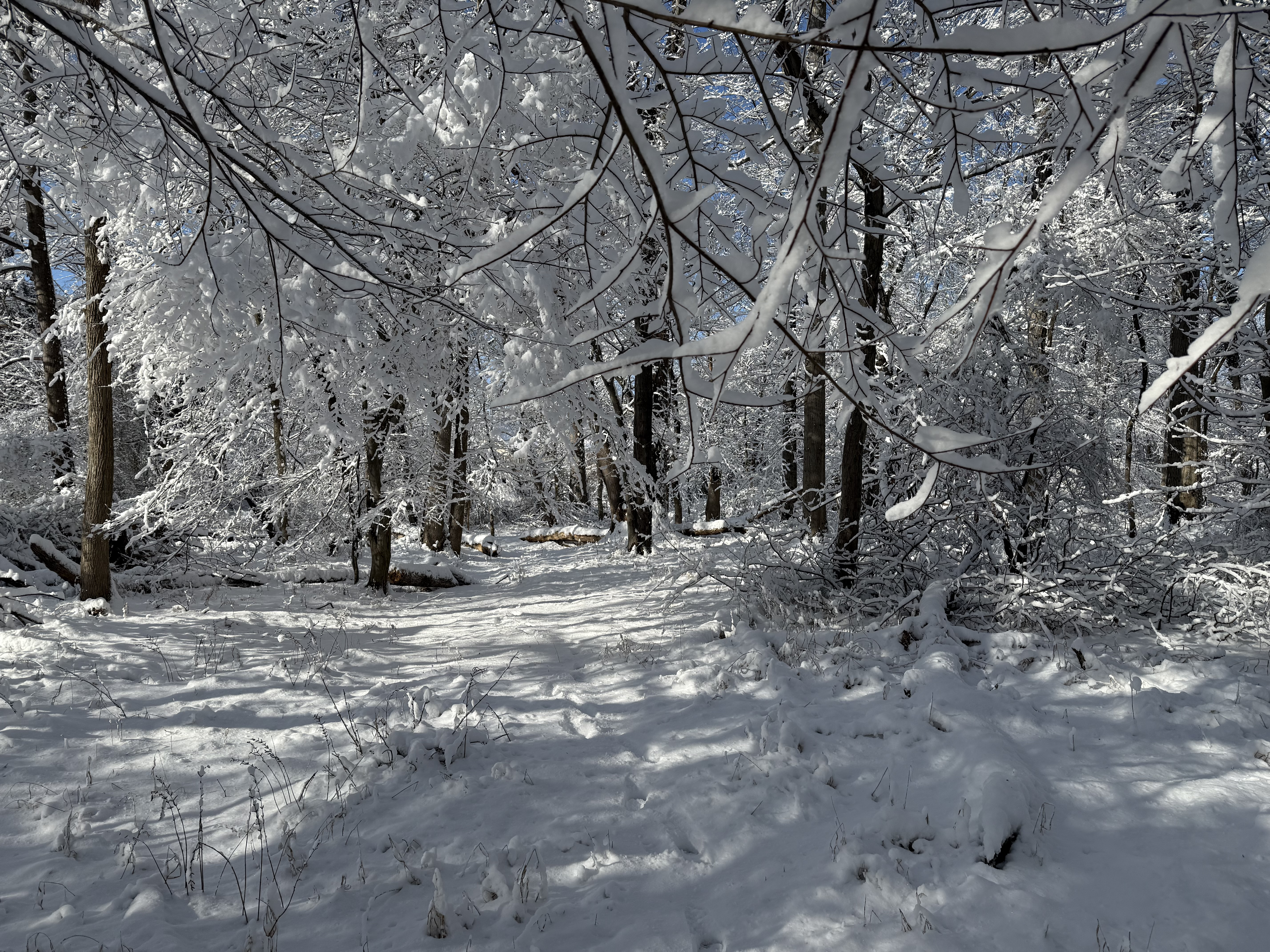
Heavy snow on trees after the storm's end in New Jersey

Light snow fell in parts of New England. Up to 5 in (13 cm) of snow fell in some areas of Connecticut and some schools saw delayed openings in the state on December 15. Slippery roads as well as high speeds led to a driver losing control and crashing into a pole in Southington, Connecticut.

Washington D.C. recorded 0.4 in (1.0 cm) of snow, however parts of the metro area recorded up to 5 in (13 cm) of snow. Thundersnow was also reported in parts of southern Maryland.

=== Canada ===
A total of around 23,000 across Nova Scotia and Newfoundland lost power.

==== Atlantic Canada and Newfoundland ====
Yellow alerts and special weather statements were issued by Environment and Climate Change Canada for parts of the Maritimes. Northumberland Ferries and Marine Atlantic cancelled ferry crossings for December 15. Snowfall began on December 15. Many schools in Nova Scotia had delays or were closed. Most schools were closed in Prince Edward Island while a few opened with delays. Health services were cancelled or had delayed openings. Less than 1,000 customers were without power by 8 A.M in Nova Scotia. No major crashes occurred. Two ferries were cancelled for December 16.

Warnings were issued in most of Newfoundland and the coast of Labrador. Northern Newfoundland were under orange winter storm or wind warnings as well as a coastal flooding statement for the eastern and northeastern coastline. Snowfall began on the night of December 14. The precipitation then transitioned to rain across the Avalon and Burin peninsulas by the morning of December 15. 18–35 mm (0.71–1.38 in) of rain fell on the Avalon before transitioning back to snow. Schools across were delayed or closed on December 15. The Gander and Grand Falls-Windsor supreme courts were closed for the day. Provincial government offices were closed in the morning for the Clarenville area. A power outage occurred in Carbonear which affected 102 customers. The storm caused Hurricane-force gusts in Newfoundland. A gust of 164 km/h (102 mph) was recorded in Cape Race. Heavy snowfall occurred. Up to 45 cm (18 in) of snow fell on the Baie Verte Peninsula. In total, roughly 22,000 were without power due to strong winds and snow. Power was restored by 10 P.M. on December 16.

== Aftermath ==
The winter storm then brought below zero temperatures across the Midwest in its wake. Extreme cold warnings were in effect until the afternoon of December 14. Minneapolis-Saint Paul International Airport saw temperatures of −10 °F (−23 °C) on the morning of December 14, with some areas as low as −22 °F (−30 °C). Cold temperatures also occurred in Fargo, North Dakota which saw −29 °F (−34 °C), as well as Milwaukee which saw −15 °F (−26 °C). Extreme Cold Watches were in place on the morning of December 14 from eastern Georgia to the Carolinas. Cold weather advisories were in effect for parts of southeastern Georgia and southwestern North Carolina as well. School closures and delays occurred on December 15 in Virginia.

== See also ==
- January 20–22, 2014 North American blizzard – similar but more intense storm that dropped heavier snowfall along the Interstate 95 corridor
