= March 18–20, 1956 nor'easter =

Winter storm in the United States

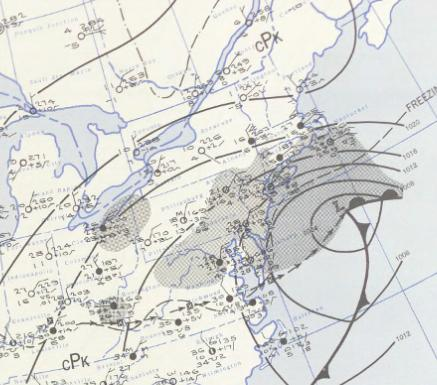
A surface weather analysis of the nor'easter

The March 18–20, 1956 nor'easter was a significant winter storm in the United States that affected the Mid-Atlantic States and southern New England. The storm ranked as Category 1, or "notable", on the Northeast Snowfall Impact Scale. A high-pressure area north of New York State, developing in the wake of another system on March 15–16, provided cold air for the snowfall. It was among a series of snowstorms to affect the region during the month.

The initial low pressure center moved southeastward into the Ohio Valley as a weak cyclone between March and March 17. As it approached the U.S. East Coast, a secondary low formed over Virginia on March 18 and gradually intensified. The primary storm dissipated shortly thereafter, and the new low emerged over the western Atlantic Ocean as it drifted northeastward. It intensified to reach a minimum barometric pressure of 1000 millibars before moving out of the region.

Precipitation began late on March 18 and ended across southern New England late the next day. Areas of northern New Jersey, southern New York, Connecticut, and Massachusetts received snowfall totals exceeding 20 in (51 cm). According to local newspaper reports, the storm was poorly forecast and caught travelers off-guard. The storm was not widespread, but it dropped heavy snowfall throughout densely populated areas. It had a severe and deadly impact, killing approximately 162 people. In Connecticut, it was considered the worst March blizzard of the century, having left drifts of snow 14 ft (4.3 m) high.

== See also ==
- Climate of the United States
- List of NESIS storms
