= Early December 2007 North American winter storm =

Weather event in the United States and Canada

Meteorological history
- Formed: November 29, 2007
- Dissipated: December 5, 2007

Winter storm
- Lowest pressure: 976 mbar (hPa)
- Max. snowfall: 44 inches at Wolf Creek Pass, Colorado

Overall effects
- Fatalities: At least 16
- Areas affected: Central and Eastern North America
- Power outages: more than 245,000

The Early December 2007 North American winter storm was a major winter storm which affected the majority of the United States and portions of southern Canada from November 29 to December 5, hitting the Intermountain West and Midwestern United States, the Great Lakes region and the Northeast. The storm brought significant snows to portions of the Upper Midwest, Great Plains and Great Lakes regions of the United States and Canada on December 1 with a major winter storm for Quebec, Ontario and parts of the Northeast region on December 2 and 3 as well as the Canadian Maritimes on December 4 and 5. The system was also responsible for a major ice storm across the Midwestern states which caused disruptions to several major cities including Des Moines, Chicago, Detroit, Milwaukee and Toronto. The storm was blamed for at least 16 deaths across nine US states and one Canadian province. 10 traffic deaths had been reported, as of 2 December 2007.

== Meteorological synopsis ==
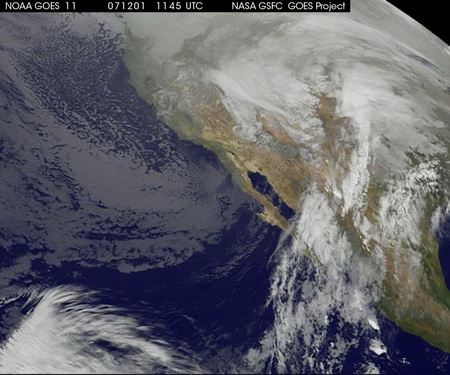
Extratropical cyclone pumping subtropical moisture into the Southwestern United States December 1, 2007

A low-pressure system developed across the southwestern United States on November 30 and brought significant rainfall for portions of the Desert Southwest as well as portions of southern California from Los Angeles to the Mexico border, where destructive fires took place in October 2007 near San Diego and Los Angeles.

The rain band then moved across the Rockies and formed a Colorado Low just southeast of Denver on the early hours of December 1. Most of the northern half of the country was under a dome of very cold air which was triggered by a weak Alberta clipper and associated front that crossed the continent prior to the storm and which brought significant lake-effect snows across the Great Lakes on November 29 and 30.

The newly formed storm then moved across the central parts of North America from Colorado to the Great Lakes bringing significant snows from the Dakotas to northern Ontario as well as in the mountain regions of New Mexico and Colorado. The storm was expected to strengthen as it approached the Atlantic Coast on December 3 and affected New England, Quebec, eastern Ontario and the Canadian Maritimes with a major winter storm, primarily snow, with some mixing in the southernmost areas. On December 5, the storm departed Newfoundland and Labrador, an area that was previously hit with a powerful storm which caused extensive power outages.

After the passage of the storm, more cold air was funneled across most of the eastern half of the country where additional lake-effect snows occurred for portions of Upper Michigan, New York state and south-central Ontario.

== Impact ==
=== Intermountain west ===
On November 29 and November 30, as the storm moved out of the Pacific region, it dumped up to four feet (1.2 m) of snow in the San Juan Mountains of southwestern Colorado. There was widespread rain at lower elevations throughout Colorado. The storm forced a men's World Cup Super-G skiing event at Beaver Creek, where the total was 15 inches (380 mm), to be canceled. 44 inches was reported at Wolf Creek Pass and 36 inches (910 mm) at Gunnison, Colorado. One person also died in an automobile accident in Colorado. As the storm skirted Utah on November 30 and December 1, it dropped up to 2 feet (0.61 m) of snow in the mountains and widespread amounts of 4–10 inches (10–25 centimetres) in the valleys as far north and west as the Wasatch Front. It also killed 1 person in a traffic accident between Santaquin and Payson.

=== Midwest ===
The storm moved into the Corn Belt in the morning of December 1, affecting the states of Nebraska, South Dakota, Kansas, Iowa, and Missouri. The storm produced a wintry mix across much of the region, including significant icing due to freezing rain of up to three-quarters of an inch (near 20 mm) thick locally in Iowa and Nebraska. Icing on the runways shut down Des Moines International Airport for several hours, after an American Airlines flight with 44 passengers skidded off a taxiway. Several events were also canceled throughout the day across much of the area. In Iowa, several presidential campaigns were forced to cancel events, including a rally near Des Moines by Bill Clinton for his wife, presidential hopeful Hillary Clinton, as well as three campaign stops planned by presidential hopeful Mitt Romney in southern Iowa. Most areas of Iowa saw about a half an inch of ice, with isolated reports as high as 2 inches (51 mm). The storm knocked out power to as much as 65,000 customers in Iowa, according to MidAmerican.

The storm moved into Illinois and Wisconsin in the afternoon of December 1. An inch or two of snow fell in many areas, before a wintry mix of icy precipitation (up to a half-inch of ice accumulation) made things even more treacherous. Numerous highway accidents were reported, resulting in three deaths in Wisconsin and one in Illinois, as well as numerous injuries. In addition, a Mesa Airlines plane with 25 passengers slid off the runway at Dane County Regional Airport in Madison, but no injuries were reported. 400 flights were canceled at Chicago's O'Hare International Airport, 28 at Midway International Airport and dozens more at Milwaukee's General Mitchell International Airport. At the height of the storm, 140,000 customers were without power in Illinois, due to the storm.

In Madison, the University of Wisconsin–Madison’s Department of Atmospheric and Oceanic Sciences department postponed its annual Solstice Party.

The storm also affected parts of Michigan, where three traffic deaths were reported, and Indiana, where one member of the Purdue University ice hockey team was killed and seven others were injured when the team van overturned 20 miles (32 km) southwest of Lafayette. Nearly 8 inches (200 mm) fell over parts of Lower Michigan (with higher amount towards the Upper Peninsula) along with one-quarter of an inch of ice.

Farther north, portions of North Dakota, Minnesota, northern Wisconsin, and northern Michigan received between 6 and 12 inches of snow. Twenty inches (fifty-one centimetres) of snow fell in Grand Marais on the north shore of Lake Superior, and a December 1st record of 10.3 inches (260 mm) was reported at Duluth. In the Twin Cities metropolitan area, 4 to 8 inches (20 cm) were reported across the area. Snow emergencies were declared for both Minneapolis and St. Paul. The Minnesota State Patrol reported 338 accidents, but no fatalities. In North Dakota, numerous traffic accidents were reported, including one fatality.

=== Northeast ===
As the storm moved into the Northeastern United States and portions of Ontario and Quebec on December 2, six inches (150 mm) of snow fell in portions of central New York, while three inches (76 mm) of snow fell across New Jersey with a dusting in several other areas. A second band of precipitation during the late hours produced areas of rain and freezing rain (of up to four-tenths of an inch of ice) across several valley areas from New York to Pennsylvania, with rain further to the east and south, while locally over a foot of snow fell across parts of Upstate New York, Vermont and New Hampshire, causing several accidents which forced the shutdown of northbound Interstate 89.

With the re-intensification of the system off the Atlantic Coast, it produced a significant winter storm for northern New England and Maine where as much as 18 inches (46 cm) fell. Most schools were closed while Governor John Baldacci sent all Maine public workers home during the afternoon of December 3. The storm system caused two traffic-related fatalities, including one in Saco, Maine and another in Saranac, New York.

=== Canada ===
During the overnight of December 1 to December 2, several areas received between 4 and 8 inches (10 and 20 centimetres) across southern Ontario including London, Kitchener-Waterloo, Guelph, Barrie and Toronto before the changeover to mixed precipitation and rain for most areas. Over northern Ontario, the town of Marathon received as much as 50 cm (19.5 in) while Thunder Bay received over 1 ft (30 cm). Ontario Provincial Police had reported over 200 accidents before Sunday afternoon alone across southern Ontario and a total of nearly 500 province-wide. Greyhound, GO and Via Rail service experienced delays of nearly one hour while several flights from Toronto's Pearson International Airport were canceled.

During the overnight of December 2 to December 3, a large zone of precipitation across the Ohio Valley moved across the Great Lakes and into eastern Ontario and southern Quebec where 12 to 14 inches (30 to 36 centimetres) fell over the cities of Montreal and Ottawa in 12 hours with freezing rain along the north shores of Lake Ontario. London received 60 cm (23.5 in) from the storm proper, followed by several days of unrelenting snowsqualls. The snow amounts broke records for most snow for the day of December 3. The old one was set in 1991 when about 6 inches fell over both regions. It was also the third biggest fall snowstorm in Montreal behind December 16, 2005 and November 30, 1944. For Ottawa, it was the biggest snowfall since nearly 14 inches (36 cm) fell on February 23, 2003, but fell well short of its all-time snowfall record of 29 inches (74 cm) set on March 2–3, 1947. In Quebec City, the 16 inches (41 cm) received in 24 hours were 4 centimeters short of its worst in such a period, the record being the same date as Montreal's worst 24-hour snowfall, March 4, 1971.

General accumulations in Quebec and northeastern Ontario were between 8 and 16 inches (20 and 41 centimetres) from the Timmins region to east of Quebec City. Numerous schools were closed across western Quebec including all schools in the Gatineau area while all school transportation was cancelled across Ottawa and Eastern Ontario. OC Transpo's articulated bus fleet experienced similar problems as during the Winter Storm of December 2005 when some buses jackknifed or were stuck in the snow in many areas across the city, although the problem was less severe than in 2005. That incident however involved similar accumulations of about one foot. Numerous flights from Macdonald–Cartier International Airport and Pierre-Elliott Trudeau International Airport (133 flights) were canceled.

The storm was blamed for three deaths in Quebec including two in car accidents on Quebec Route 153 near Yamachiche and Quebec Autoroute 955 near Victoriaville. One day later, in the aftermath of the storm, a third person died in Val-des-Monts when a temporary garage structure collapsed and trapped the victim under a heavy load of snow that was in process of being removed.

As the storm redeveloped off the Atlantic Coast on December 3 and 4, it gave another round of heavy and mixed precipitation for New Brunswick, Prince Edward Island and Nova Scotia. Areas of northern and eastern New Brunswick received over a foot of snow, causing the city of Moncton to shut down all services, while several flights from airports in Moncton, Saint John, Fredericton and Halifax were cancelled. In Fredericton, a unique phenomenon consisting of blowing and heavy snow along with winds produced several giant snowballs, called snow rollers, across several front lawns. About 24,000 homes in New Brunswick, 8,000 in Nova Scotia, and 14,500 in Prince Edward Island were without power due to the snow, mixing and strong winds.

== See also ==
- Winter storms of 2007-08
