= April 2021 nor'easter =

Slow-moving nor'easter in April 2021

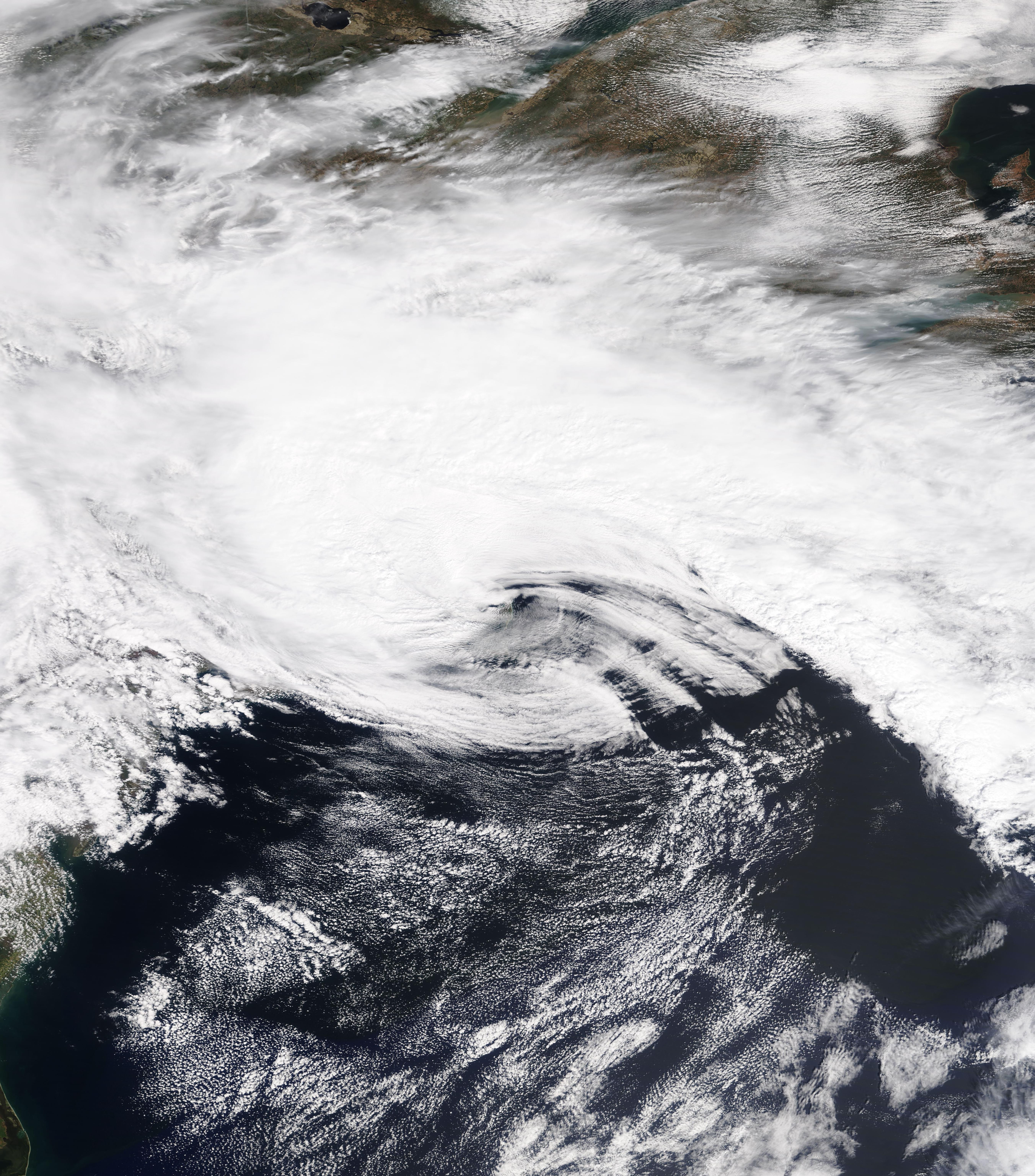
- NASA satellite imagery of the nor'easter near peak intensity over Cape Cod at 18:58 UTC (2:58 p.m. EDT) on April 16

Meteorological history
- Formed: April 14, 2021
- Exited land: April 17, 2021
- Dissipated: April 20, 2021

Nor'easter
- Highest winds: 50 mph (85 km/h) (1-minute sustained winds)
- Highest gusts: 68 mph (109 km/h) at Mount Washington, New Hampshire
- Lowest pressure: 988 mbar (hPa); 29.18 inHg
- Max. rainfall: 2.59 in (66 mm) at Rockland, Maine
- Max. snowfall: Snow – 14 in (36 cm) at Lempster, New Hampshire

Overall effects
- Areas affected: Northeastern United States, New England, Atlantic Canada
- Power outages: > 20,000
- Part of the 2020–21 North American winter

A significant late-season nor'easter, sometimes referred to as the 2021 Spring nor'easter, impacted much of New England with heavy snowfall, gusty winds, thundersnow, and near-whiteout conditions from April 15–17, 2021. The system originated from a weak frontal system late on April 14 over North Carolina, which moved into the ocean the next day and began to strengthen. The low-pressure steadily deepened as it moved up the East Coast, and developed an eye-like feature just prior to peak intensity. It prompted a fairly large area of Winter Storm Warnings across interior sections of New England, with Winter Weather Advisories being issued closer to the coast. Over 20,000 customers lost power at the height of the storm on April 16 due to heavy wet snow, and near-whiteout conditions were reported in many areas. Several injuries, some serious, occurred as well, mostly due to traffic incidents on poorly-treated roadways during the storm. Damage estimates from the system are currently not calculated.

== Meteorological history ==
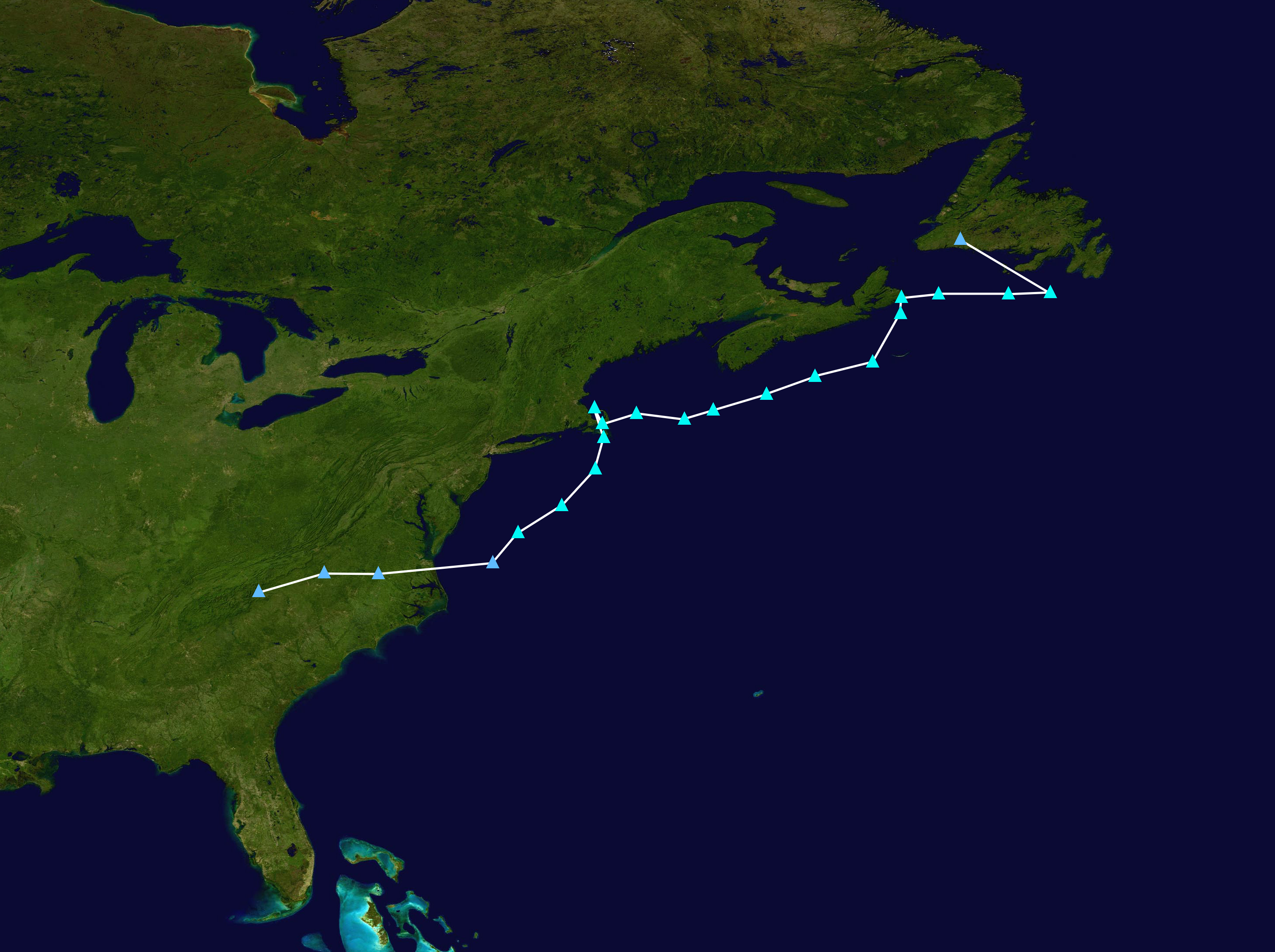
Map plotting the storm's track and intensity, according to the Saffir–Simpson scale Map key Saffir–Simpson scale Tropical depression (≤38 mph, ≤62 km/h) Tropical storm (39–73 mph, 63–118 km/h) Category 1 (74–95 mph, 119–153 km/h) Category 2 (96–110 mph, 154–177 km/h) Category 3 (111–129 mph, 178–208 km/h) Category 4 (130–156 mph, 209–251 km/h) Category 5 (≥157 mph, ≥252 km/h) Unknown Storm type Tropical cyclone Subtropical cyclone Extratropical cyclone, remnant low, tropical disturbance, or monsoon depression

The nor'easter formed as a weak frontal system at 18:00 UTC on April 14 over western North Carolina, along an already existing series of fronts stretching down the U.S. East Coast. Several media outlets referred to the nor'easter as the "Spring nor'easter" due to its unusual occurrence in mid-spring. It had transitioned into an extratropical cyclone by 12:00 UTC on April 15, as it moved offshore into the Atlantic Ocean and slowly began to strengthen. The low-pressure then steadily strengthened as it moved northeastward up the coast, with its minimum central pressure dropping below 1,000 millibars (30 inHg) at 00:00 UTC on April 16. The system then turned northwards towards the southeastern Massachusetts coastline, while beginning to strengthen faster. Strong mesoscale banding developed in central and eastern Massachusetts, resulting in much higher snowfall totals than initially forecasted in those areas.

The nor'easter then proceeded to make two consecutive landfalls, first in Dukes County, Massachusetts and again near Hyannis, Massachusetts between 12:00 and 15:00 UTC, as it reached its peak intensity of 988 millibars (29.2 inHg) over Cape Cod. While maintaining peak intensity, the nor'easter made a third landfall near Kingston, Massachusetts at 21:00 UTC, before making a fourth and final landfall near Barnstable, Massachusetts at 00:00 UTC on April 17. After this point, the nor'easter began to steadily weaken while moving northeast toward Nova Scotia, and later passing to the south of it. The weakening nor'easter then slowly meandered east of Nova Scotia, moving to the northeast and making landfall along the southern coast of Newfoundland at 00:00 UTC on April 20, with a central pressure of 998 millibars (29.5 inHg). After coming ashore, the nor'easter began to rapidly weaken, dissipating over eastern Newfoundland later that day.

== Preparations and impact ==
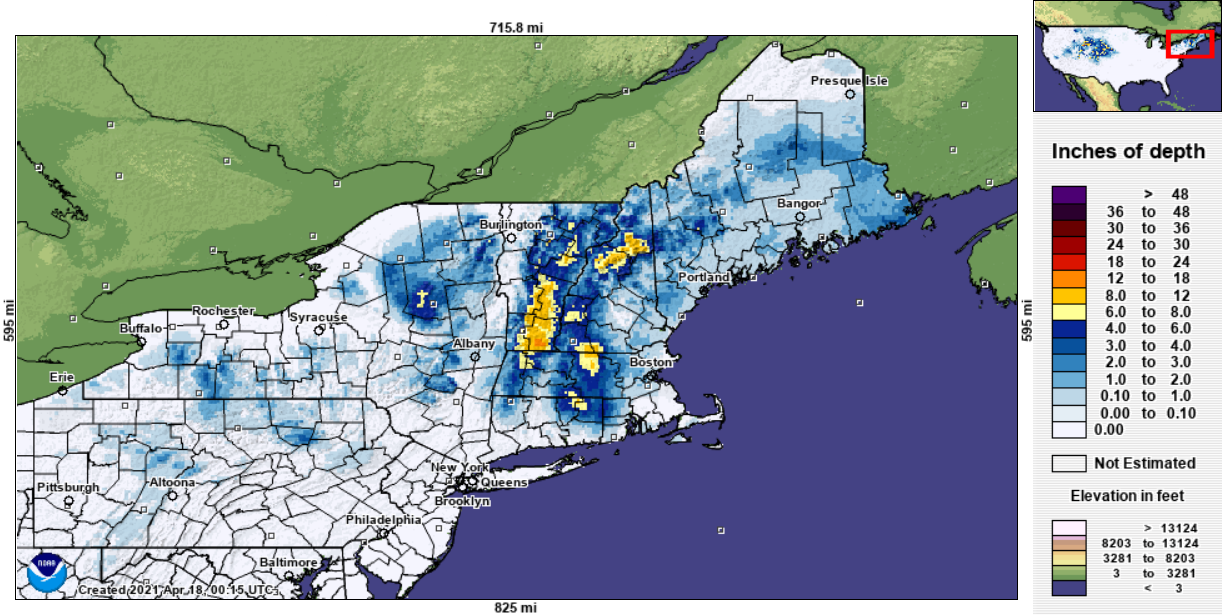
Map of observed snowfall accumulations in the Northeastern United States from the storm

Early on April 14, Winter Storm Watches were issued in the higher elevations of interior New England, and expanded to include more areas later that day. The next day, many Winter Storm Watches were upgraded to Winter Storm Warnings, mainly in the higher elevations, while Winter Weather Advisories were issued in lower elevation areas closer to the coast.

=== Northeastern United States ===
==== Mid-Atlantic states ====
Much of the Mid-Atlantic saw heavy, soaking rain from the nor'easter, in areas where temperatures weren't cold enough to support snow. New York City picked up 0.83 inches (21 mm) of rain, and areas further to the north saw even more. The rain resulted in a New York Mets game against the Philadelphia Phillies being postponed. Up to 2.5 inches (64 mm) of rain was reported in the Mid-Atlantic, with the highest totals just outside of the New York metropolitan area. The region also saw strong gusty winds from the storm, resulting in windswept rain in many areas. Some areas along the southern Long Island shore also reported minor coastal flooding due to the system. The Adirondack Mountains of Upstate New York changed over to snow briefly on the back edge of the storm, and up to 6 inches (15 cm) accumulated on the highest peaks.

==== New England ====
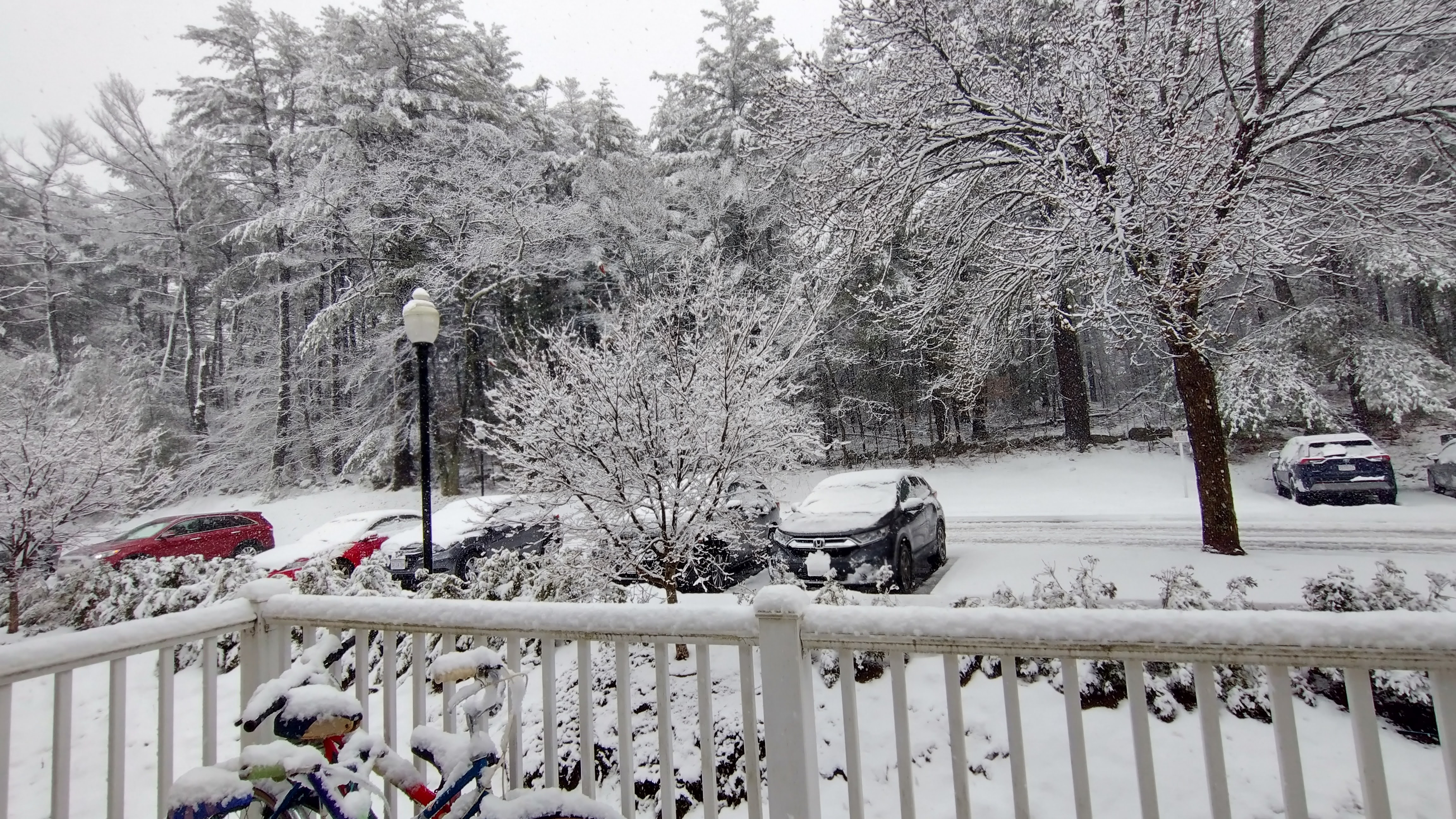
Snowfall accumulation in Lexington, MA during the storm

In advance of the storm, Green Mountain Power in Vermont warned customers of possible power outages during the storm and prepared for restoring power if necessary. They also reminded customers to be prepared for power outages, possibly lasting up to a day. The Vermont Agency of Transportation warned of poor road conditions due to heavy wet snow, and closed VT 108 in Stowe prior to the storm to reduce work for snowplow operators. In New Hampshire, dozens of school districts announced school closings or a switch to remote learning for April 16 in advance of the storm.

In Rhode Island, a coating of snow was observed in Providence, with up to 4 inches (10 cm) falling in the northwestern part of the state. Snowflakes were even observed as far south as Narragansett Bay for a period of time. In Massachusetts, the Berkshires and Worcester Hills in Massachusetts saw a widespread 6–12 inches (15–30 cm) of snow from the system, while the lower elevations of Greater Boston saw 1–3 inches (2.5–7.6 cm). The Blue Hill Observatory in Milton picked up 3.6 inches (9.1 cm) of snow, making it the sixth-largest April snowstorm on record for the city. The Boston area also observed occasional thundersnow on the morning of April 16, during the period of heaviest snow and highest instability. High snowfall rates and snow-covered roads in central and eastern Massachusetts led MassDOT to deploy over 240 additional snowplows at 10 a.m. EDT on April 16. A game between the Boston Red Sox and Chicago White Sox at Fenway Park was postponed due to the snow at the stadium.

In New Hampshire, widespread snowfall amounts of 8–12 inches (20–30 cm) were observed, with some areas reporting even higher totals. In Maine, the Portland International Jetport delayed a number of flights due to heavy snow and extremely gusty winds. At the airport, snowfall rates of over 1 in/hr (2.5 cm/hr) and wind gusts of over 50 mph (80 km/h) were observed. Numerous crashes occurred on snow-covered roadways, with Maine State Police responding to three serious crashes. Crashes on roadways were the main source of injuries from the storm. Snowfall accumulations weren't as high in Maine as neighboring states, but up to 9 inches (23 cm) of snow was observed in western areas of the state.

=== Snowfall totals ===
Highest observed snow totals from each affected state
State	Town	Amount
New Hampshire	Lempster	14 inches (36 cm)
Massachusetts	Princeton	12 inches (30 cm)
Vermont	Winhall	11.1 inches (28 cm)
Maine	Temple	8.3 inches (21 cm)
Connecticut	Tolland	7.1 inches (18 cm)
New York	Livingstonville	6 inches (15 cm)
Rhode Island	North Foster	5.1 inches (13 cm)
Pennsylvania	Ricketts Glen State Park	3 inches (7.6 cm)

== See also ==
- North American blizzard of 2005
- April 2007 nor'easter
- March 2013 nor'easter
- January 2015 North American blizzard
- December 5–6, 2020 nor'easter
- February 6–8, 2021 nor'easter
