= Eastern Canadian blizzard of March 1971 =

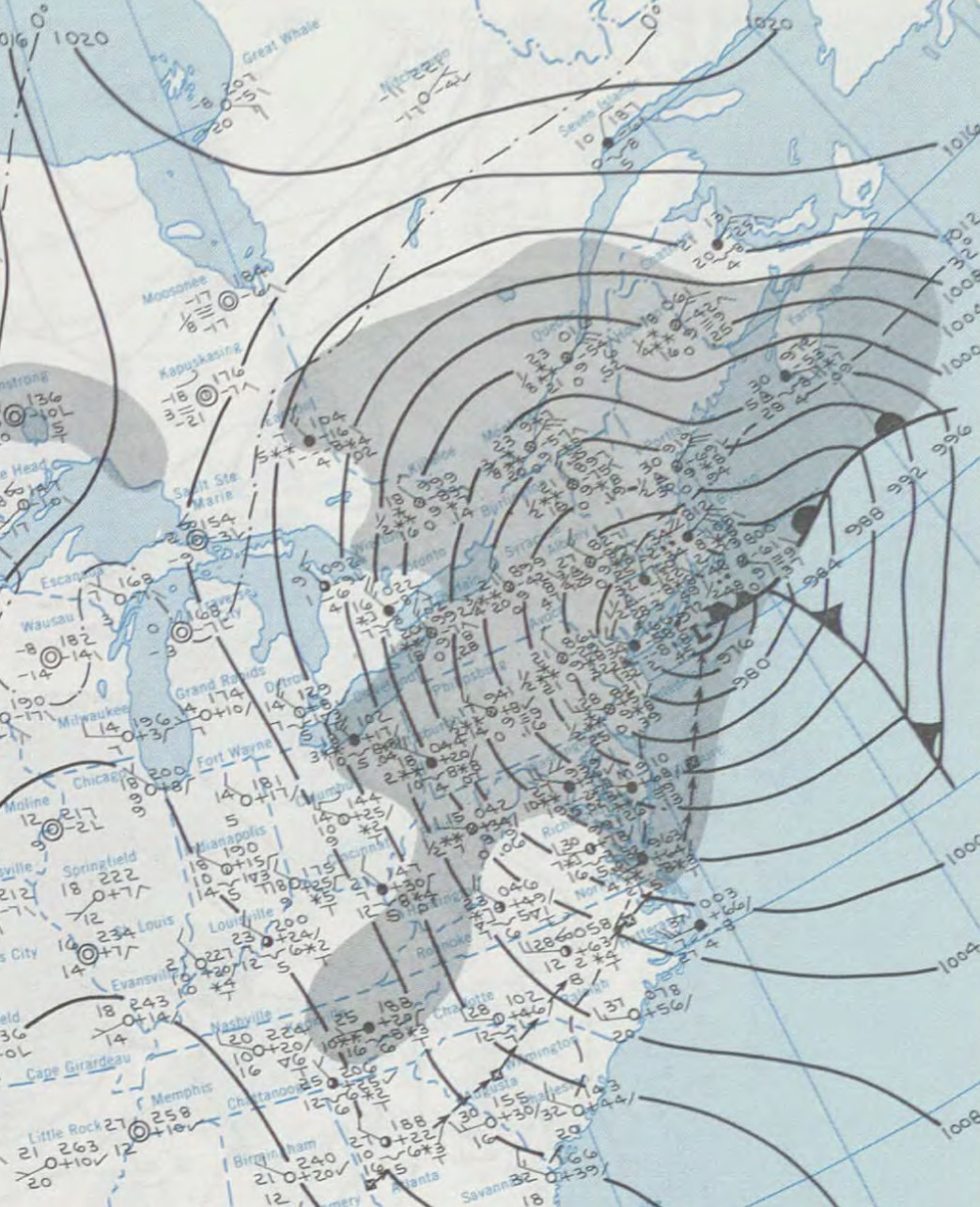
- Weather map of the storm on March 4, 1971

Meteorological history
- Formed: March 3, 1971
- Dissipated: March 5, 1971

Category 4 "Crippling" blizzard
- Regional snowfall index: 10.18 (NOAA)
- Lowest pressure: 966 mb (28.5 inHg)
- Max. snowfall: 32.1 inches (82 cm) of snow in Mont Apica, Quebec

Overall effects
- Fatalities: at least 30
- Damage: at least $1 million
- Areas affected: Eastern North America

The Eastern Canadian blizzard of March 1971 was a severe winter storm that struck portions of eastern Canada from March 3 to March 5, 1971. The storm was also nicknamed the "Storm of the Century" in Quebec. The event included the worst 24-hour snowfall on record in the city of Montreal with 43 centimetres (16.9 inches) of snow falling on March 4, for a total of 47 centimetres (18.5 inches), until the one-day record was broken again on December 27, 2012. Higher terrain in eastern Quebec received as much as 80 centimetres (31.5 inches). Heavy snowfall was also recorded in eastern Ontario and northern New Brunswick as well as parts of the Northeastern United States. The storm itself was responsible for the deaths of 17 people in Montreal (30 province-wide) along with numerous other injuries directly and indirectly attributed to the blizzard.

== Blizzard event ==
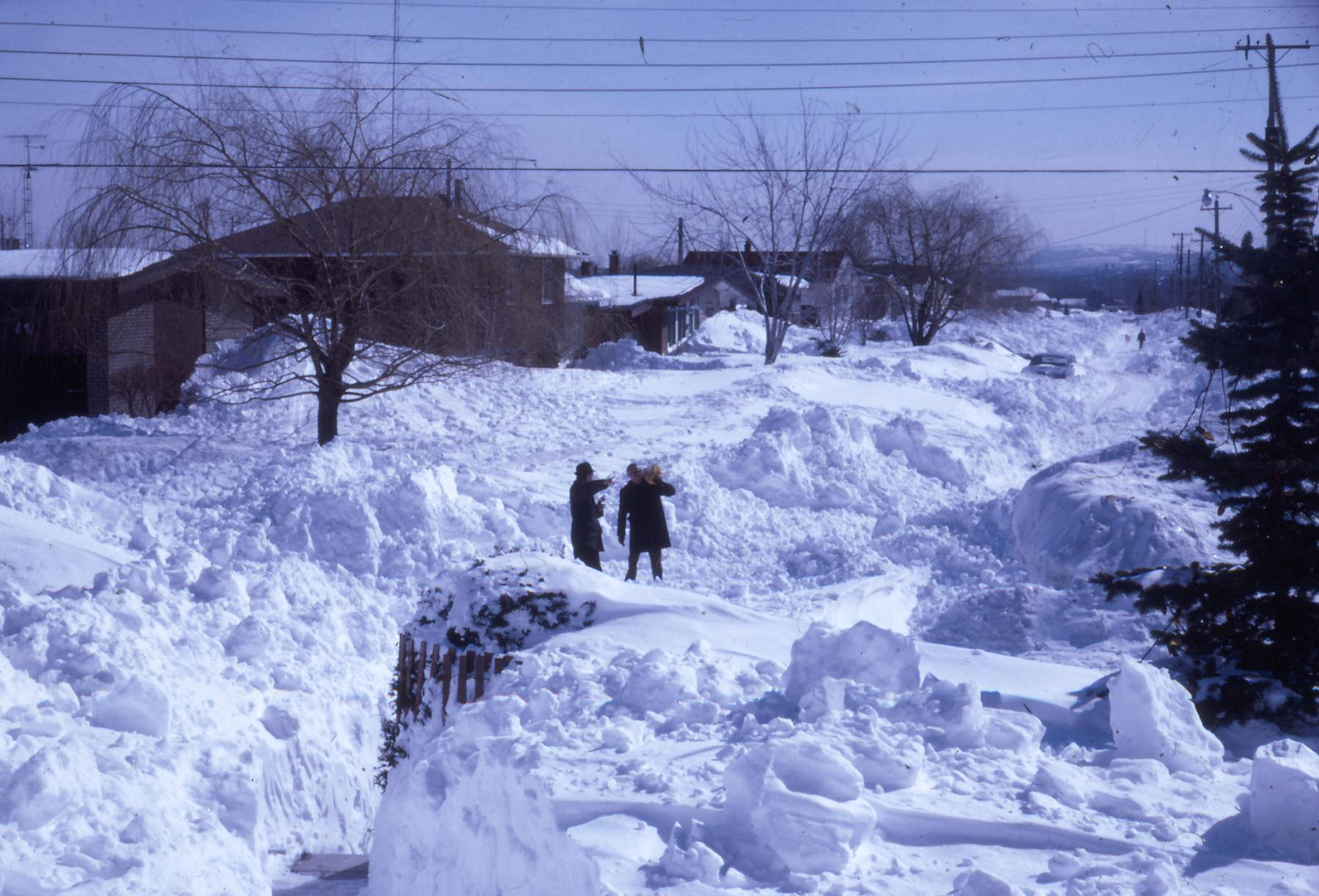
Street in Duvernay, Laval, Quebec

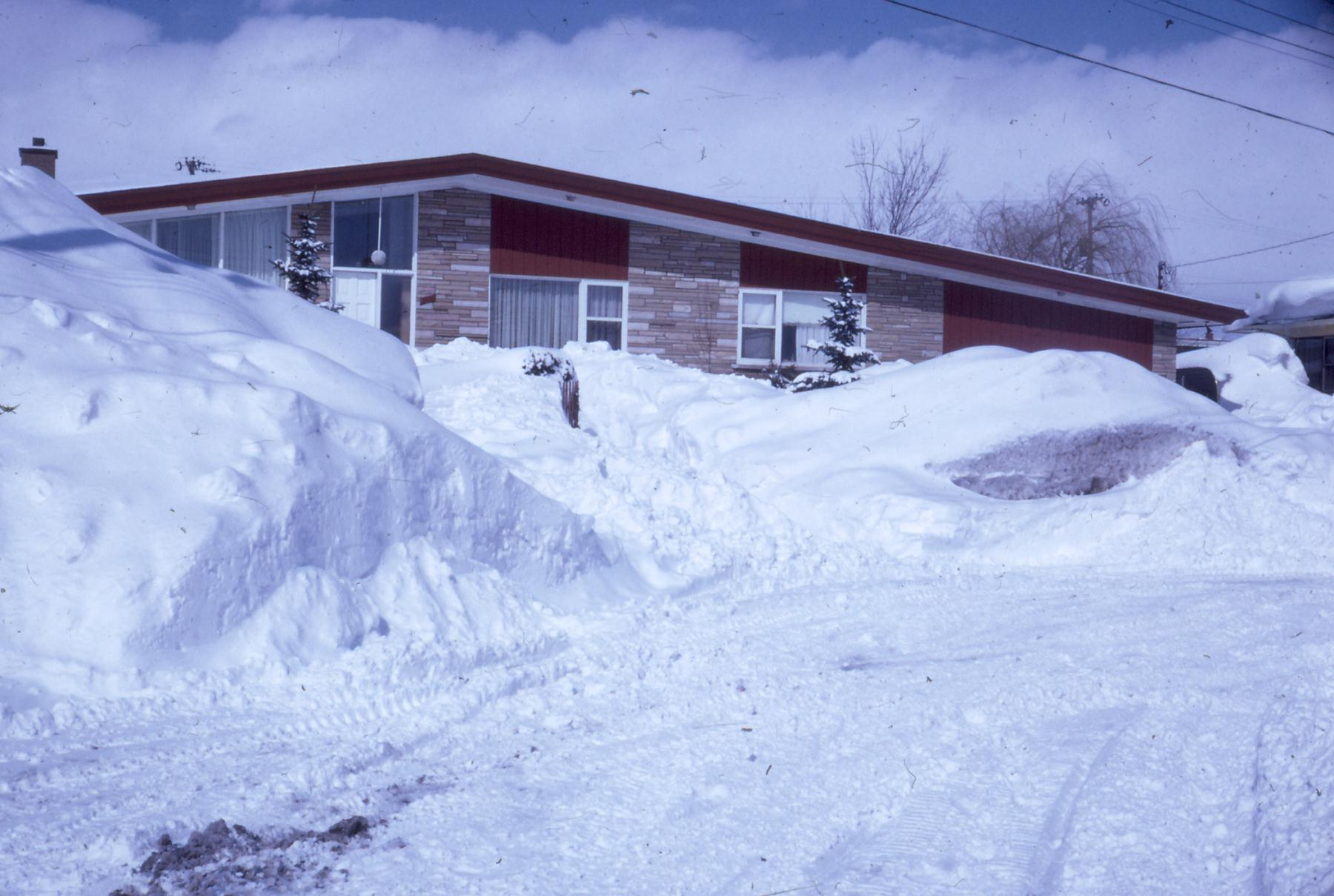
House in Duvernay, Laval, Quebec.

A coastal low-pressure system, called a Nor'easter, developed across the coastal United States late on March 3, 1971. The system rapidly intensified as it moved towards the Northeast United States as well as Quebec and eastern Ontario. The storm centre had a rapid pressure drop to 966 millibars (966 hPa; 28.5 inHg) while it was centred over New York before moving across New Brunswick exiting the province of Quebec during the morning of March 5.

Snow started across most of the affected areas on March 3 with the peak of the storm during most of the day on March 4 where for a period of up to 17 hours there was at least moderate snow and blowing snow in Montreal. Visibility was also significantly reduced for nearly 24 hours. The 47 centimetres (18.5 inches) received makes it one of the heaviest snowfalls on records for Montreal with the 43 centimetres (16.9 inches) received on March 4 being the snowiest day on record.

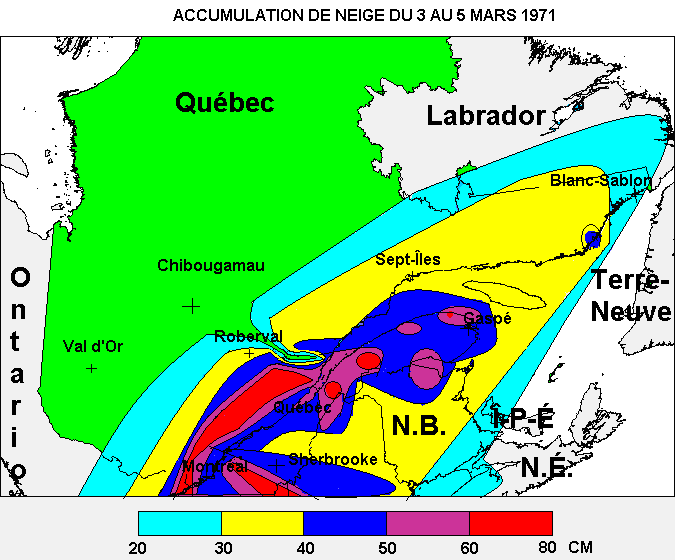
Snow accumulations from 3rd to 5th of March

Elsewhere across Quebec, 80 centimetres (31.5 inches) of snow fell in the Laurentides Wildlife Reserve north of Quebec City while 65 to 75 centimetres (25.6 to 29.5 inches) of snow fell locally in the Gaspésie, Bas-Saint-Laurent and Eastern Townships regions south of the Saint Lawrence River. Up to 40 centimetres (15.7 inches) fell in the Ottawa and Quebec City regions. The heavy snow was accompanied by damaging wind gusts of near hurricane-force, which created snowdrifts of up to two stories high in some places. Widespread power outages were reported and some were left without power for up to ten days. The city of Montreal was left paralyzed following the storm for a few days. Bus service was stopped: snowmobiles and the Montreal Metro were the easiest transportation options possible throughout the city, while bridges and roads were completely shut down. For the first time in over 50 years a Montreal Canadiens National Hockey League game at the Montreal Forum was postponed. Seventeen people were killed in Montreal while there were several other injuries related to the storm. Fatalities were resulted by heart attacks or people stuck inside stranded vehicles. At least two people were killed in the Quebec City region and at least 30 fatalities were reported province-wide. It took at least 36 hours to clean up the worst of the storm and to resume regular traffic although snow clearing operations lasted for several days. Initial damage estimates were at about $1 million (1971 dollars) for central Quebec including 50 homes that received roof damage. Businesses also sustained window damage some due to flying debris particularly in the Limoilou area of Quebec City.

Quebec Snowfall Amounts - March 3–5, 1971
City	Snowfall Amounts
Mont Apica	80.2 cm (31.6 in)
Upton	72.5 cm (28.5 in)
Gaspé	58.4 cm (23.0 in)
Saint-Hubert (Longueuil)	58 cm (22.8 in)
Trois-Rivières	52.1 cm (20.5 in)
Drummondville	51.6 cm (20.3 in)
Joliette	48 cm (18.9 in)
Montreal (Dorval Airport)	47 cm (18.5 in)
Sherbrooke	30.5–45.7 cm (12.0–18.0 in)
Quebec City	44.3 cm (17.4 in)
Hull-Ottawa	30–40 cm (11.8–15.7 in)
CFB Bagotville (Saguenay)	19.3 cm (7.6 in)
All amounts are snowfall only

== Historical perspective ==
The 1970–1971 winter season was the worst on record for many areas of eastern Ontario and southern Quebec in terms of all-time snowfall records. Ottawa had received up to 444 centimetres (174.8 inches) of snow that year and Montreal just over 380 centimetres (149.6 inches), records that were nearly broken during the 2007–2008 season when Ottawa received 436 centimetres (171.7 inches) and Montreal 375 centimetres (147.6 inches). Quebec City also had their worst season in 1970–1971 with 460 centimetres (181.1 inches) before it was broken in 2007–2008 when just over 500 centimetres (196.9 inches) fell.

Storms in December 1969 left 58 centimetres (22.8 inches) in three days across the city making that event the most significant snowfall event from one system. Other systems in 1954, 1955, and 2001 had higher total snowfalls for a single event making the 1971 even the fifth-heaviest single-event snowfall.

The record snowfall may have been a contributing factor for a deadly mudslide in the town of Saint-Jean-Vianney in May 1971 when heavy rains combined with already saturated grounds because of heavy melting snow formed a large sinkhole of about 600 metres (660 yards) wide and 30 metres (98.4 feet) deep. Thirty-one people were killed by the mudslide.
