= January 2024 North American winter storm =

January 2024 North American winter storm can refer to any of the four storms that affected North America in a two-week time period in January 2024.

- January 2024 nor'easter – brought the first accumulating snow to parts of the Northeast and New England in two years
- January 8–10, 2024 North American storm complex – Brought several inches of snow to the Upper Midwest and caused a tornado outbreak in the South along with heavy rains, flooding and wind to the East Coast of the United States.
- January 10-13, 2024 North American storm complex – Followed very shortly after the previous storm with an identical track and affected the same areas, but brought blizzard conditions and very cold temperatures in its wake.
- January 13–16, 2024 North American winter storm – affected much of the country with snow, caused damaging ice in the Pacific Northwest, killed dozens after dropping snow in the South, and brought accumulating snow to much of the Mid-Atlantic states for the first time in two years.
