= February 2024 nor'easter =

Extratropical cyclone

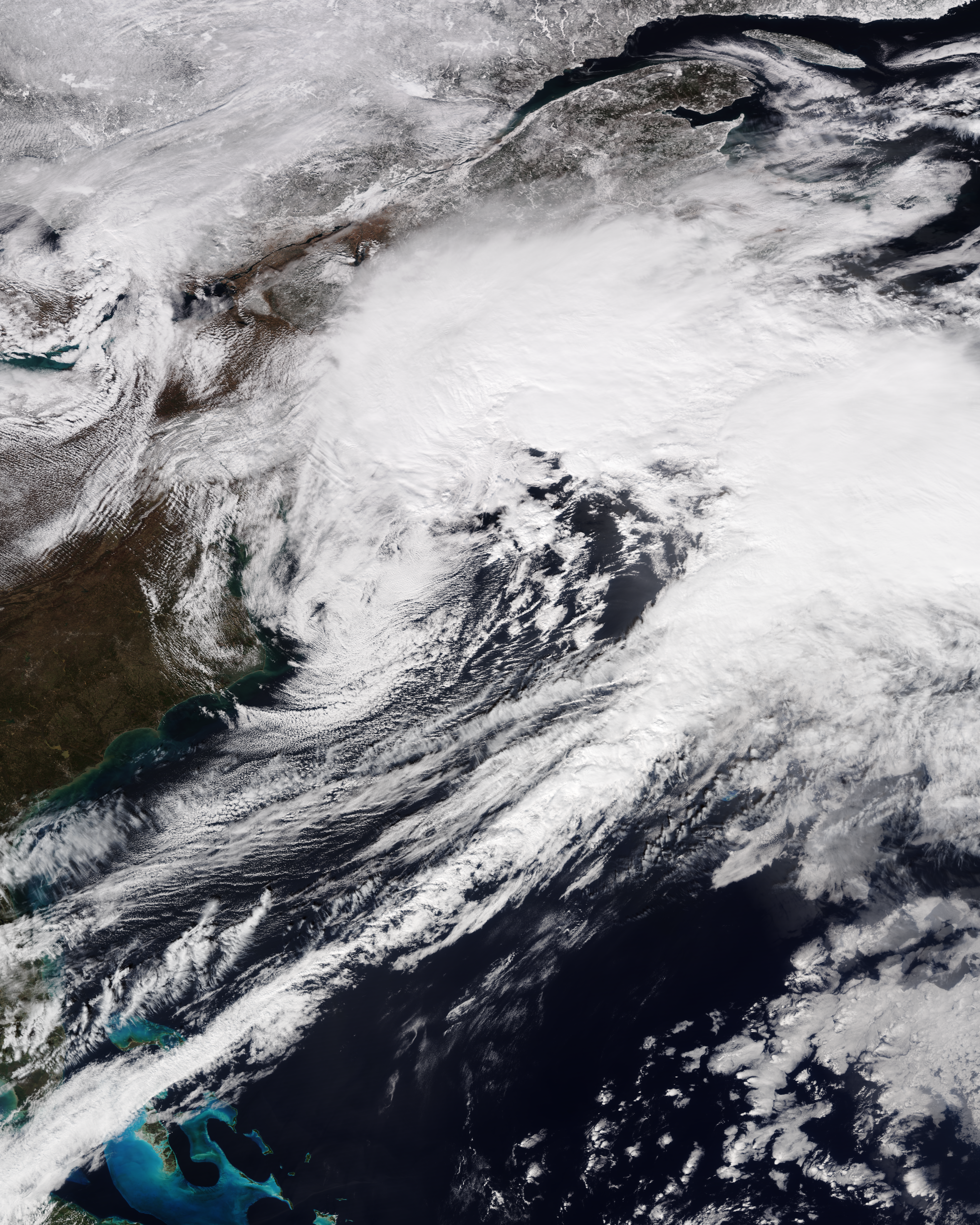
- GOES-16 satellite image of the nor'easter rapidly strengthening near the Northeastern United States at 18:00 UTC (1:00 p.m. EST) on February 13, 2024

Meteorological history
- Formed: February 10, 2024
- Exited land: February 13, 2024
- Dissipated: February 18, 2024

Winter storm
- Highest gusts: ~50 mph (80 km/h) near Cape Cod, Massachusetts
- Lowest pressure: 956 hPa (mbar); 28.23 inHg
- Max. rainfall: 7.10 in (180 mm) near Avon, Alabama
- Max. snowfall: 15.7 in (40 cm) in West Hartford, Connecticut

Overall effects
- Fatalities: 1
- Areas affected: Southern United States, Ohio Valley, Northeastern United States
- Power outages: >176,000
- Part of the 2023–24 North American winter

A quick-moving, but powerful and disruptive nor'easter, unofficially referred to as Winter Storm Lorraine by the Weather Channel and Birch by other media outlets, brought widespread effects primarily in the Mid-Atlantic and New England regions of the Northeastern United States from February 12–13, 2024. Developing from a combination of an upper-level low and an area of low-pressure in the Southwestern United States on February 10, the system first brought heavy snow to the Texas Panhandle the following day. It then moved northeastwards across the Ohio Valley, causing impacts before beginning to consolidate into a more defined low as it approached the East Coast. The system then began rapid deepening as a nor’easter it moved offshore early on February 13, bringing heavy snowfall to much of the Mid-Atlantic. The system departed later that day, but not before bringing impacts to Atlantic Canada before peaking and gradually weakening thereafter, eventually dissipating on February 18.

Many cities in the Northeast and the Mid-Atlantic, particularly New York City, were expected to receive the heaviest snowfall accumulation in at least two years due to the nor'easter, although the storm was notable for being difficult to predict in the aforementioned regions in the hours leading up to the event. For example, forecasts for Boston released on the morning of February 12 predicted at least a foot of snow, but when the storm moved through the New England region the following day, it hardly dropped any snow on the city after taking a more southerly course. Flights were cancelled or delayed across the Mid-Atlantic, and millions spanning from Pennsylvania to Massachusetts were placed under winter storm warnings. Over 175,000 people across the Northeast lost power, due to the heavy wet nature of the snow, and the nor'easter was responsible for at least one death so far as of February 13. Separately, the system dumped at least 1 foot (12 in; 30 cm) in parts of Texas and Oklahoma causing severe impacts in the region as well.

== Meteorological history ==
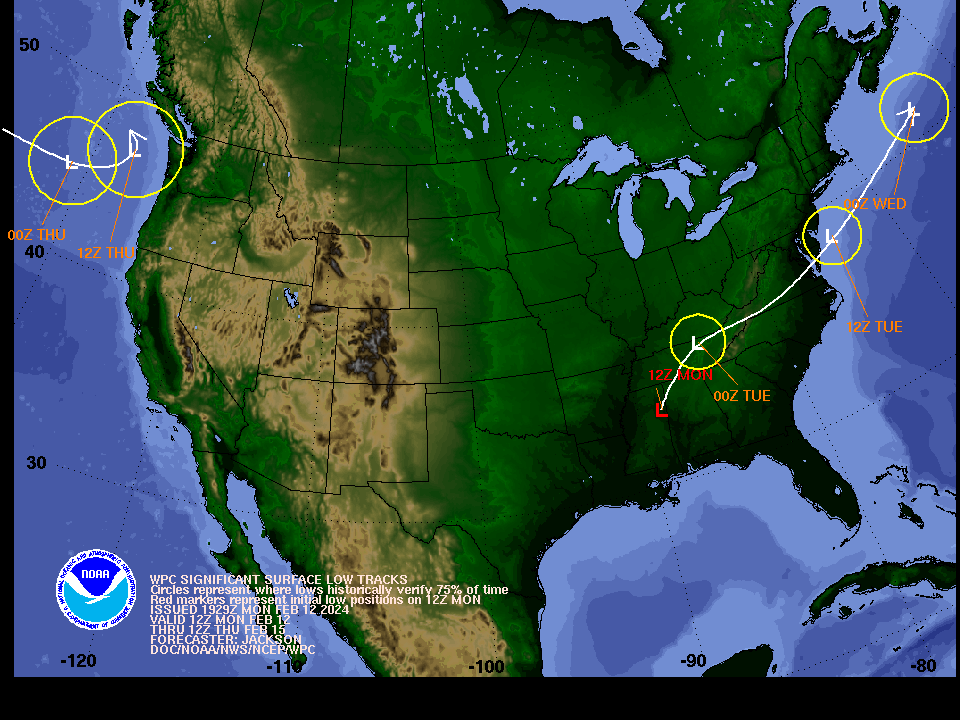
Weather Prediction Center (WPC) graphic showing the track of the low-pressure associated with the storm

Map plotting the storm's track and intensity, according to the Saffir–Simpson scale Map key Saffir–Simpson scale Tropical depression (≤38 mph, ≤62 km/h) Tropical storm (39–73 mph, 63–118 km/h) Category 1 (74–95 mph, 119–153 km/h) Category 2 (96–110 mph, 154–177 km/h) Category 3 (111–129 mph, 178–208 km/h) Category 4 (130–156 mph, 209–251 km/h) Category 5 (≥157 mph, ≥252 km/h) Unknown Storm type Tropical cyclone Subtropical cyclone Extratropical cyclone, remnant low, tropical disturbance, or monsoon depression

The setup for a potential coastal storm in the Northeastern United States was evident as early as the afternoon of February 8. Uncertainties as to how the system would develop, how much cold air would be available and how the upper-level features would evolve in the run up to the event. The primary factors expected in the development of the system involved an upper-level shortwave trough that would eject out of the Southwest, leading to coastal development. By February 10, the aforementioned feature began developing in the Southwest, and due to limited cold air, heavy wet snow affected the northern parts of Texas and Oklahoma. A weak area of low pressure developed along the Gulf Coast and trekked northeastwards throughout February 11–12 across the Southeast as the system as a whole continued eastward. At 09:00 UTC, the Weather Prediction Center deemed it necessary to begin issue storm summary bulletins for the winter storm. At that time, precipitation mostly consisted of rain showers and squalls, with isolated wet snow in the colder regions of the atmosphere near the upper-level low. Later on February 12, a primary low-pressure area began to consolidate in the Tennessee Valley, strengthening as it moved eastwards and as precipitation began to slowly move into the Mid-Atlantic states.

As the system became a nor'easter and moved offshore, rapid deepening – known also as "bombing out" – commenced overnight, with the central pressure falling from 991 mb (29.3 inHg) at 09:00 UTC on February 13 to 964 mb (28.5 inHg) at 03:00 UTC on February 14, a drop of 27 millibars (0.80 inHg) in 18 hours. As this process commenced during the early morning hours on February 13, precipitation rapidly switched from rain to heavy snowfall along much of the Mid-Atlantic, with rates approaching 1–2 inches (2.5–5.1 cm) per hour in the northwestern and northeastern portions of New Jersey and Pennsylvania, respectively, which led to the heaviest snowfall totals of the event in those areas. The nor'easter moved quickly, with precipitation and snowfall ending across the Mid-Atlantic and eventually New England by evening that day; consequently, the WPC terminated storm summary bulletins for the departing nor'easter at 03:00 UTC on February 14. The system continued to rapidly deepen afterwards as it began impacting Atlantic Canada with heavy snow and gusty winds, peaking at a minimum pressure of 956 mb (28.2 inHg) at 18:00 UTC that day while located south of Nova Scotia. The system slowly began weakening thereafter as it moved further into the North Atlantic Ocean.

== Preparations ==
=== Northeastern United States ===
Winter storm watches and warnings were issued for the impending nor'easter from as far west as central Pennsylvania to the coast of Massachusetts.

==== Mid-Atlantic ====
Vehicle restrictions were poised to go into effect on February 13 in Pennsylvania as the Pennsylvania Department of Transportation (PennDOT) began actively pre-treating roadways ahead of the storm.

Schools across the state of New Jersey closed or moved classes to remote learning. Despite not declaring a state of emergency, governor Phil Murphy strongly encouraged citizens to remain indoors and to not travel during the morning commute when the heaviest snowfall would be occurring, as well as encouraging to work from home, if possible. Additionally, a commercial vehicle ban was set to go into effect at midnight and state offices were to open on a delayed schedule. Morris County residents were advised to think twice before traveling, and snowplows and equipment were loaded with salt to begin pre-treating major roadways such as Interstate 280 that evening.

On February 10, Tom Suozzi encouraged constituents of New York's 3rd congressional district to vote early in the 2024 New York's 3rd congressional district special election, due to a forecast of snow on Election Day. In southern New York, where New York City and the surrounding regions and boroughs were expected to receive at least 5–8 inches (13–20 cm) of snow – the heaviest expected for the city since a blizzard in January 2022, schools moved to online learning for February 13. Westchester County declared a state of emergency late on February 12, in order to ensure the safety of its citizens.

==== New England ====
Connecticut closed some of its schools and business for February 13. Governor Ned Lamont also announced that a tractor-trailer ban was going into effect at midnight. In the town of Hartford, approximately 100 crews and thirty trucks were prepared to treat roadways with salt for the storm.

Rhode Island governor Dan McKee also implemented a tractor-trailer ban beginning at midnight as well, while also stating the state government would be closed the following day. The Department of Housing (DOH) said it would be setting up emergency shelters as well as warming centers across the state.

In Massachusetts, schools closed altogether for the following day, and Boston mayor Michelle Wu declared a snow emergency and advised residents to stay off the roads altogether.

== Impact ==
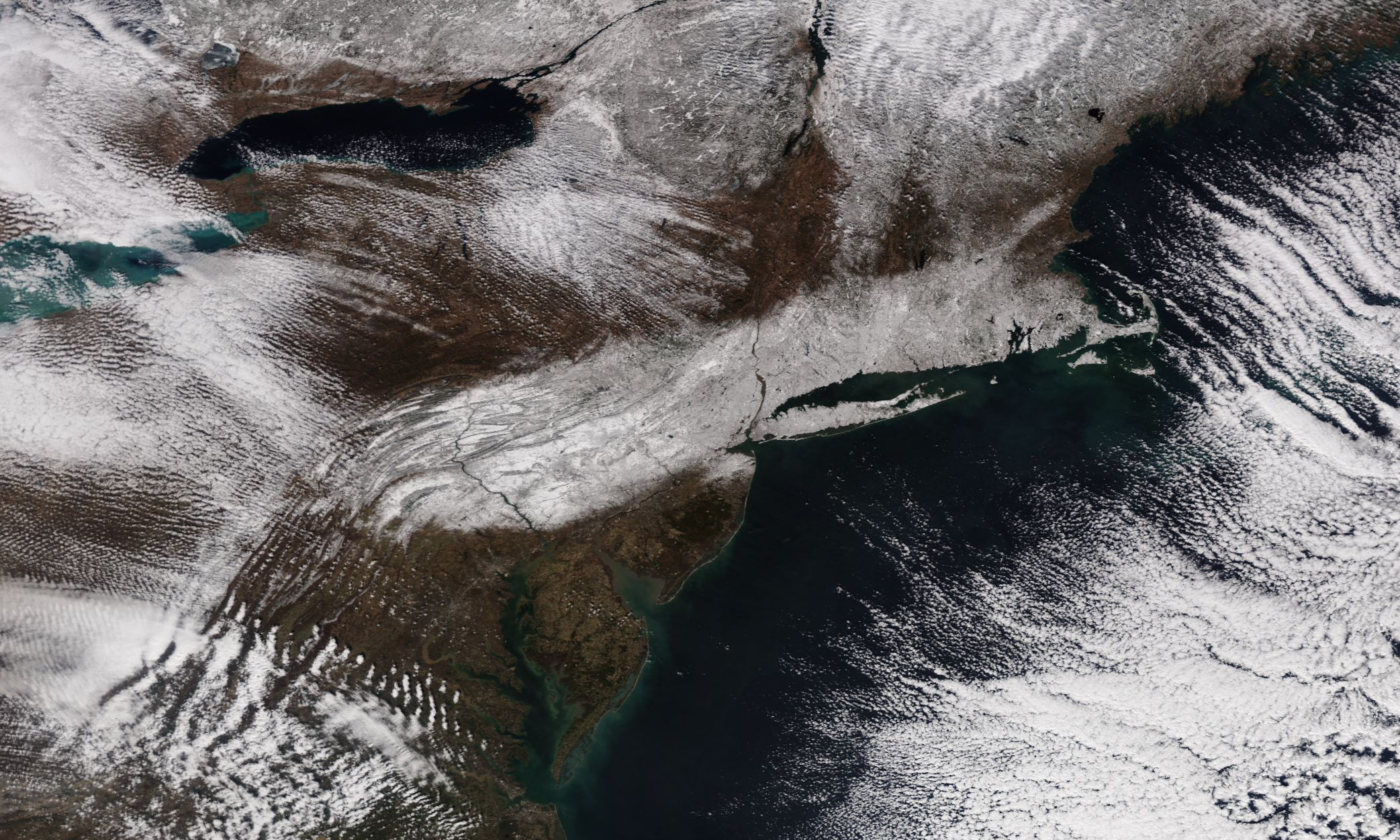
Snowfall from the nor'easter across the Northeastern United States the day after the storm, on February 14

=== Southern United States ===
Parts of the states of Texas and Oklahoma received upwards of over 1 foot (12 in; 30 cm) of heavy wet snow in the storm's precursor stage. Travel in the town of Plainview, Texas was reportedly "crippled" by 14 in (36 cm) of snow, which became the heaviest snow in the region. Portions of New Mexico received over 6 in (15 cm) of snow as well, and Bandelier National Monument was closed during the storm.

Further east, hail up to 3 in (7.6 cm) affected Louisiana and eastern Texas. Several roads in Houston County, Alabama sustained damage from flooding. In the state of Georgia, rainfall peaked at 6.23 in (158 mm) in Byron, with travel advisories issued for both I-75 and I-16 in the Macon, Georgia area. Further north, Nashville reported thundersnow on the night of February 12.

=== Northeastern United States ===
==== Mid-Atlantic ====
The highest snowfall total in Delaware was only 2.2 in (5.6 cm).

Over 140,000 customers lost power in Pennsylvania. Heavy snow fell across the northern suburbs of the Philadelphia metropolitan area, with Tobyhanna recording 14.5 in (37 cm) of snow. However, much less snow fell further south, with only 0.6 in (1.5 cm) of snow at Philadelphia International Airport. Interstate 81 was closed near Shippensburg, Pennsylvania after cars got stuck in snow, and heavy snow also shut down parts of Interstate 83. A fatality occurred in York County in a snowmobile crash.

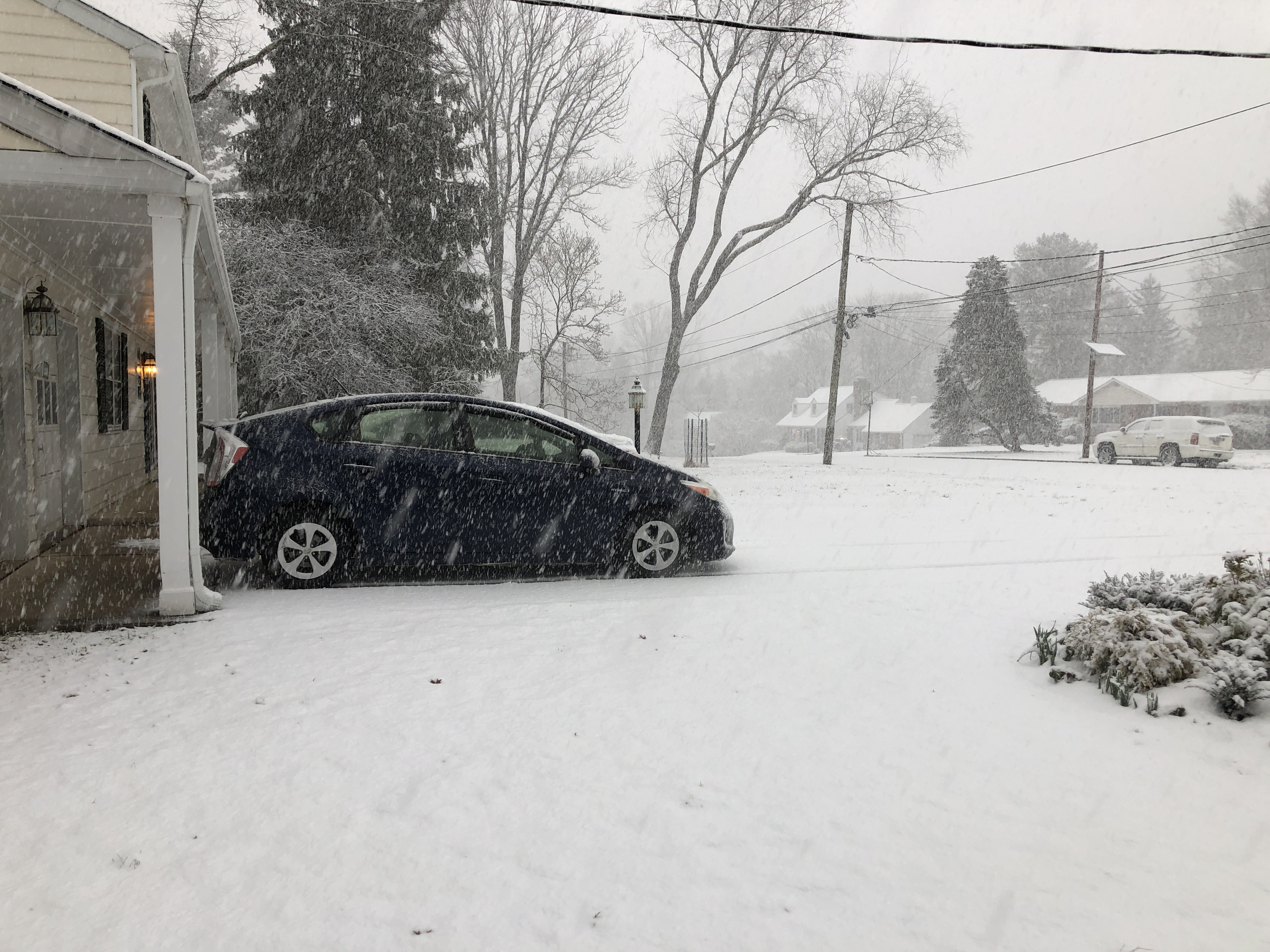
A burst of heavy snow during the nor'easter in central New Jersey

In New Jersey, approximately 13,000 people lost power. In the city of Atlantic City, only trace of snow was recorded. However, snowfall in the state varied widely, as Sussex recorded 15.0 in (38 cm) of snow.

In New York City, snowfall totals reached 3.2 in (8.1 cm) at Central Park, 3.3 in (8.4 cm) at LaGuardia Airport, 4.2 in (11 cm) at John F. Kennedy International Airport, and 4.9 in (12 cm) at Newark Liberty International Airport. Up to 8.7 in (22 cm) of snow fell in portions of Long Island. The snow resulted in numerous subways being delayed, changing from express to local or skipping stops, with the Z Train being suspended altogether. All train services to the World Trade Center was suspended due to a power outage. A ground stop was also briefly imposed at JFK Airport, while LaGuardia Airport cancelled nearly half of all daily flights on February 13.

==== New England ====
In Hartford, Connecticut, small parts of Interstate 91 closed due to a jackknifed tractor trailer. The heaviest snowfall in the region was nearby, with 15.7 in (40 cm) of snow in West Hartford, Connecticut. However, parts of northwestern Connecticut, often the snowiest region of the state, had lower totals around 4 in (10 cm) of snow.

In the state of Massachusetts, over 23,000 customers lost power and snow resulted in Massachusetts Route 28 closing. Despite significant snow in many parts of the state, Boston only received 0.1 in (0.25 cm) of snow.

== See also ==
- February 6–8, 2021 nor'easter – also struck the Northeast just after the Super Bowl
- February 9–11, 2017 North American blizzard – a similar fast-moving blizzard that was also proceed by above average temperatures in the Northeast.
