= January 13–16, 2024 North American winter storm =

Category 1 winter storm and ice storm in the United States

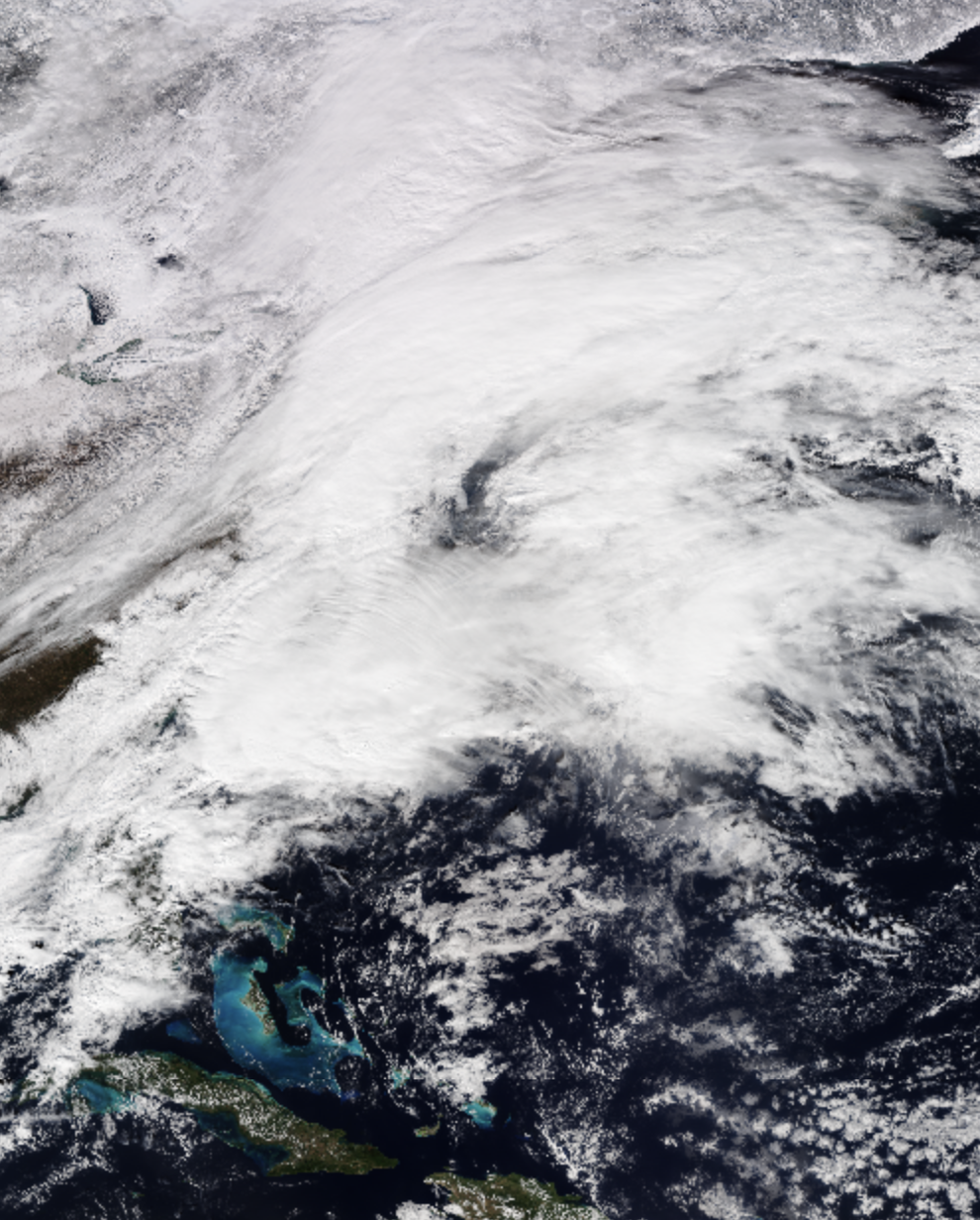
- Satellite image of the winter storm affecting the Mid-Atlantic states on January 16, 2024

Meteorological history
- Formed: January 12, 2024
- Dissipated: January 18, 2024

Category 1 "Notable" winter storm
- Regional snowfall index: 1.44 (NOAA)
- Highest gusts: 118 mph (190 km/h) near Copper Mountain, Colorado
- Lowest pressure: 983 mbar (hPa); 29.03 inHg
- Max. snowfall: 49.5 in (126 cm) in Green Mountain Reservoir, Colorado

Overall effects
- Fatalities: 30
- Damage: $3.0 billion (2024 USD)
- Areas affected: Northwestern, Southern and Northeastern United States, Atlantic Canada
- Power outages: >200,000
- Part of the 2023–24 North American winter

From January 13 to 16, 2024, a wide-ranging winter storm, unofficially named Winter Storm Heather by The Weather Channel and news outlets, caused significant impacts across much of the continental United States, particularly in the Southern regions of the country. Originating as an extratropical cyclone over the northeastern Pacific Ocean on January 12 moved ashore the following day, bringing heavy snowfall and ice accumulations to areas closer to the coastline than usual. The winter storm then weakened over the Rocky Mountains, and leftover energy combined with an arctic front settling in near the Gulf Coast resulted in wintry precipitation in states that rarely receive it such as Texas, Louisiana, and Florida. The system then consolidated and intensified slightly as it began to move northwards towards the Mid-Atlantic states. It then moved just offshore and brought accumulating snowfall to most of the region as well as New England on January 16–17 before it moved into Canada soon after.

Widespread, significant and deadly impacts were observed from coast to coast in the U.S. due to the winter storm, as areas that normally did not receive frozen precipitation were affected adversely. In the Northwest, ice accumulations and high wind gusts knocked out power to many as the system moved ashore, in addition to later triggering avalanches in the mountainous regions of the states of Colorado and Utah the following day. Further east, bitter cold combined with the winter storm resulted in at least 30 deaths in the South, in addition to wintry weather resulting in closures and traffic delays across a large portion of the Southern United States. In the mid-Atlantic and New England, cities like New York City, Washington D.C. and Philadelphia saw their first accumulating snowfall over 1 inch (2.5 cm) in nearly two years, ending a record 700-plus-day streak with no such accumulation.

== Meteorological history ==
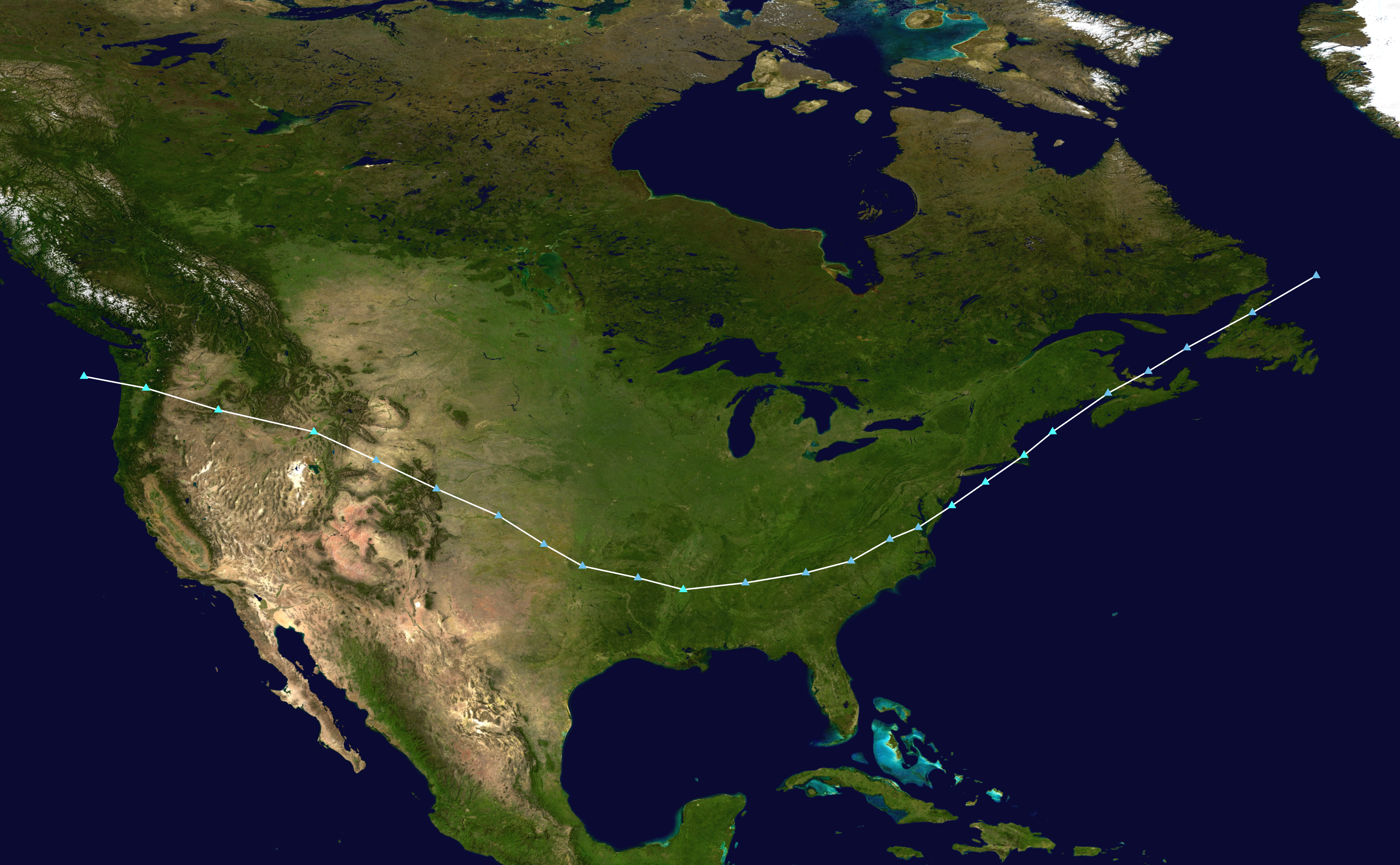
Map plotting the storm's track and intensity, according to the Saffir–Simpson scale Map key Saffir–Simpson scale Tropical depression (≤38 mph, ≤62 km/h) Tropical storm (39–73 mph, 63–118 km/h) Category 1 (74–95 mph, 119–153 km/h) Category 2 (96–110 mph, 154–177 km/h) Category 3 (111–129 mph, 178–208 km/h) Category 4 (130–156 mph, 209–251 km/h) Category 5 (≥157 mph, ≥252 km/h) Unknown Storm type Tropical cyclone Subtropical cyclone Extratropical cyclone, remnant low, tropical disturbance, or monsoon depression

The winter storm entered the Pacific Northwest on January 12, bringing heavy snow, ice, and high winds to Northern Oregon. The storm also triggered avalanches in Utah and Colorado. The storm then dove southeast, bringing heavy snow in Texas and Tennessee. The storm then brought the first significant snow in years to the Northeastern United States before exiting.

== Preparations and impact ==
335,000 flights were delayed from January 13 to 16th, with 8,600 cancellations, largely due to weather.

=== Northwestern United States ===
==== Oregon ====
In the Columbia River Gorge, hurricane-force wind gusts were reported. Winds in the Columbia River Gorge reached 80 mph (130 km/h), with gusts over 50 mph (80 km/h) in Portland. Cold air exiting the Columbia Basin produced the strong winds through the Gorge and into the Portland metropolitan area and Willamette Valley kept temperatures at the surface below freezing while warm onshore flow aloft created a temperature inversion. Freezing rain caused significant ice accumulations with some areas experiencing up to nearly 1.5 inches (38 mm).

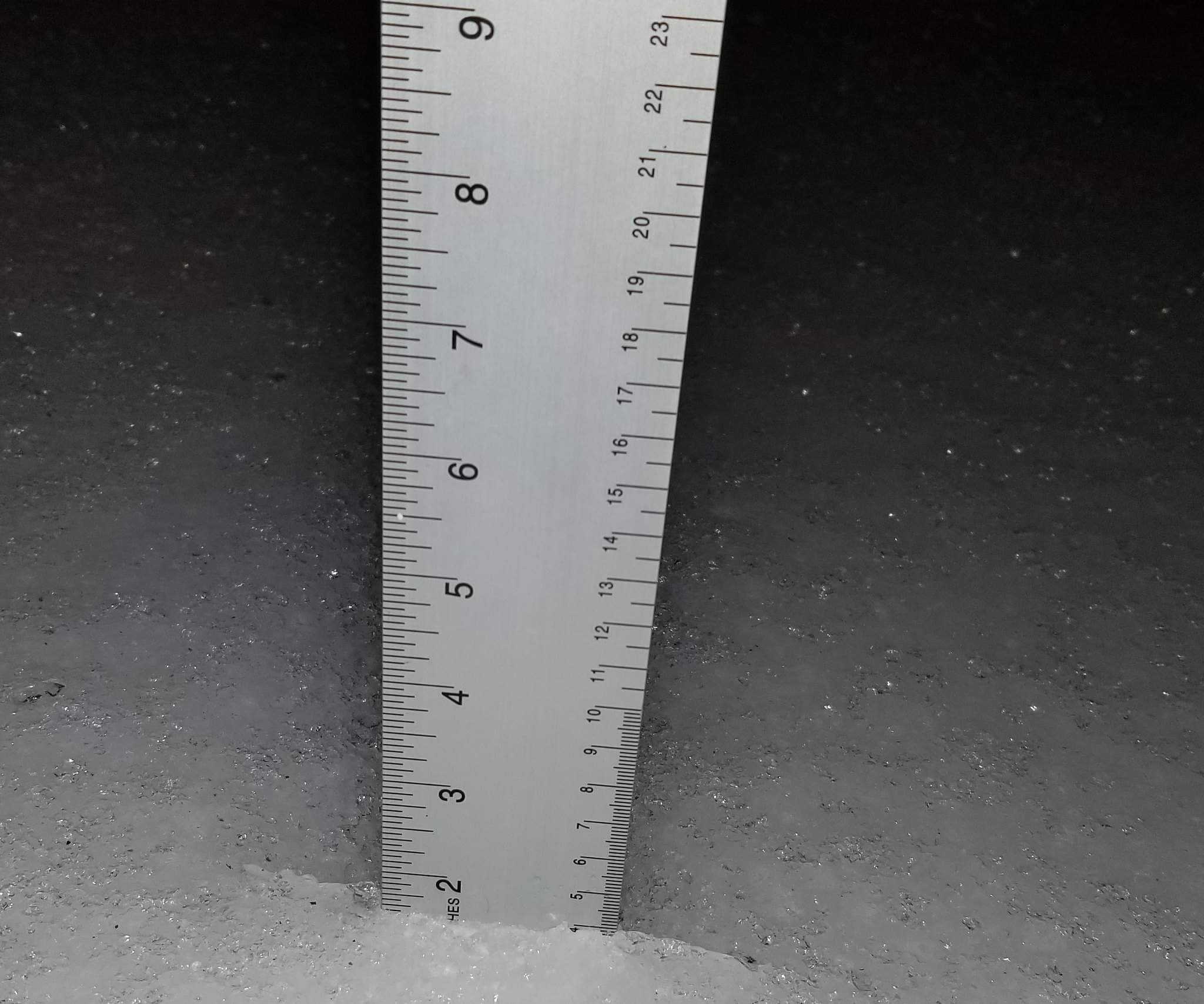
Steel ruler stabbed into ice over pavement, western Eugene.

Several vehicle crashes occurred in the Willamette Valley.

The strong wind and ice accumulation in the Portland area resulted in widespread trees being blown down. Over 200,000 customers lost power throughout the state. Eleven people were reportedly killed with victims being crushed by fallen trees, experiencing hypothermia, or being electrocuted by fallen power lines. Colleges across the area closed due to the hazardous weather, as did Crater Lake National Park.

=== Southern United States ===
Heavy snow fell in the Southeastern United States, with 7.6 in (19 cm) of snow in Nashville and 3.4 in (8.6 cm) of snow in Memphis. The heavy snow in Tennessee shut down Great Smoky Mountains National Park. 30 dogs had to be rescued in Nashville at an impound location due to the winter weather and bitter temperatures.

Prior to the arrival of the winter storm and associated cold in Texas, officials assured residents that the power grid was ready to handle the weather, after the crippling of the state's power grid during a previous winter storm in February 2021. They advised citizens to conserve power and that the cold weather would not last as long as the 2021 event. In the city of Houston, an 18 wheeler overturned on I-10, shutting down the highway. An injury also occurred due to a car pileup on Texas State Highway 121. Lake effect snow occurred in North Texas, with 2.3 in (5.8 cm) of snow in Coppell and 2 in (5.1 cm) of snow in Forney.

Schools across several states, including Louisiana, Mississippi and Alabama closed as a result of the storm. In St. Martin Parish, portions of Interstate 10 and Interstate 210 closed due to the winter weather. In Cullman County, Alabama, many motorists were stranded on Interstate 65 after a series of car crashes shut down the highway. In Louisiana, parts of Highway 23 were also closed. The storm also spawned a tornado in Florida.

=== Northeastern United States ===
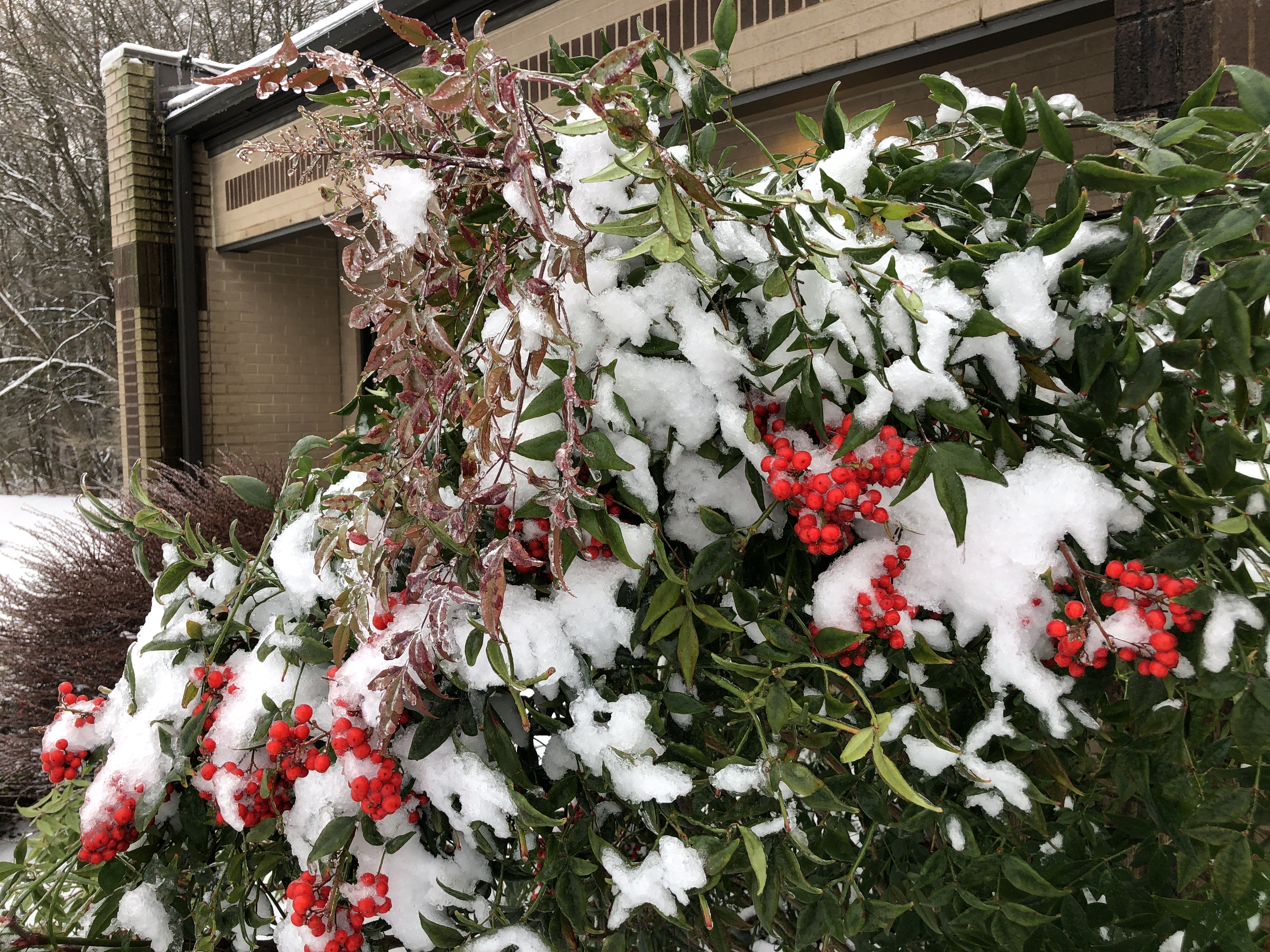
Snow and ice on bushes during the storm in New Jersey

In the Northeastern United States, the storm snapped record long streaks without 1 in (2.5 cm) of snow in several cities.

==== Mid-Atlantic ====
In Pennsylvania, 3.3 in (8.4 cm) of snow fell in Philadelphia. The winter storm lead to a brief ground stop at Philadelphia International Airport. Further south, 4.9 in (12 cm) of snow fell in Baltimore, with Washington D.C. recording 4.1 in (10 cm) of snow. Heavy snow resulted in federal offices shutting down on January 16. A parade in Baltimore celebrating Martin Luther King Day was cancelled due to snow. Five fatalities occurred on a car crash on Interstate 81 in northeastern Pennsylvania.

Central Park reported 1.2 in (3.0 cm) of snow on January 16, their first inch of snow in a single day since February 13, 2022. (Note: While 1.8 in (4.6 cm) of snow fell in Central Park during the February 2023 North American storm complex, since the storm was across two days, neither day had an inch of snow.) The storm total there was 1.6 in (4.1 cm). The winter storm led to ground stops at John F. Kennedy International Airport and LaGuardia Airport, where snow totals were slightly higher than Central Park. Schools were closed on January 16 in Jersey City, New Jersey.

In Western New York, lake effect snow led to 3 fatalities, with snow totals in Copenhagen, New York being 40 in (100 cm) in just 27 hours and 15 minutes. The lake effect snow prompted a Buffalo Sabres game against the Chicago Blackhawks to be postponed.

==== New England ====
Most of Massachusetts received around 2 in (5.1 cm) of snow, though some locations in the state picked up 4 in (10 cm). The snow resulted in 100 flight cancellations and 290 delays at Boston Logan International Airport.

== See also ==
- January 2014 Gulf Coast winter storm
- February 2014 nor'easter
