= 2023–24 North American winter =

- Snowfall and ice on the ground in North America from December 22, 2023 to February 19, 2024

Seasonal boundaries
- Meteorological winter: December 1 – February 29
- Astronomical winter: December 21 – March 19
- First event started: November 21, 2023
- Last event concluded: April 6, 2024

Most notable event
- Name: January 13–16, 2024 North American winter storm
  - Duration: January 13–16, 2024
  - Lowest pressure: 983 mb (29.03 inHg)
  - Fatalities: 30 fatalities
  - Damage: $3 billion (2024 USD)

Seasonal statistics
- Total WPC-issued storms: 15 total
- Rated storms (RSI) (Cat. 1+): 2 total
- Major storms (RSI) (Cat. 3+): 0 total
- Maximum snowfall accumulation: 59 in (150 cm) in Sydney, Nova Scotia (February 2–5, 2024)
- Total fatalities: 106 total
- Total damage: $10.57 billion (2024 USD)

Related articles
- Asian winter, European windstorm season

The 2023–24 North American winter was the warmest winter on record for most of the contiguous United States, with below-average snowfall primarily in the Upper Midwest and parts of the Northeastern United States. However, some areas, especially in the states of Pennsylvania, New Jersey and New York saw considerably more snow than the previous winter. Notable winter events were also more prevalent across the eastern half of the country this winter, including a series of winter storms in mid-January that brought snow from the South to Northeast states, a period of very cold temperatures across much of the continent in mid-to-late January, and a disruptive nor'easter that affected much of the Mid-Atlantic in mid-February. Additional events included in other places included a record-breaking blizzard that struck Canada and atmospheric river events in California, both in the month of February. Two storms were rated on the Regional Snowfall Index (RSI), although none attained a "Major" rating (Category 3+) on the scale. A strong El Niño was expected to influence the winter weather patterns across the continent. The winter weather-related events this season led to an estimated US$10 billion in damages, and an estimated 106 fatalities, much of it occurring in the month of January.

While there is no well-agreed-upon date used to indicate the start of winter in the Northern Hemisphere, there are two definitions of winter which may be used. Based on the astronomical definition, winter begins at the winter solstice, which in 2023 occurred on December 21, and ends at the March equinox, which in 2024 occurred on March 19. Based on the meteorological definition, the first day of winter is December 1 and the last day February 29. Both definitions involve a period of approximately three months, with some variability. Winter is often defined by meteorologists to be the three calendar months with the lowest average temperatures. Since both definitions span the calendar year, it is possible to have a winter storm spanning two different years.

== Seasonal forecasts ==
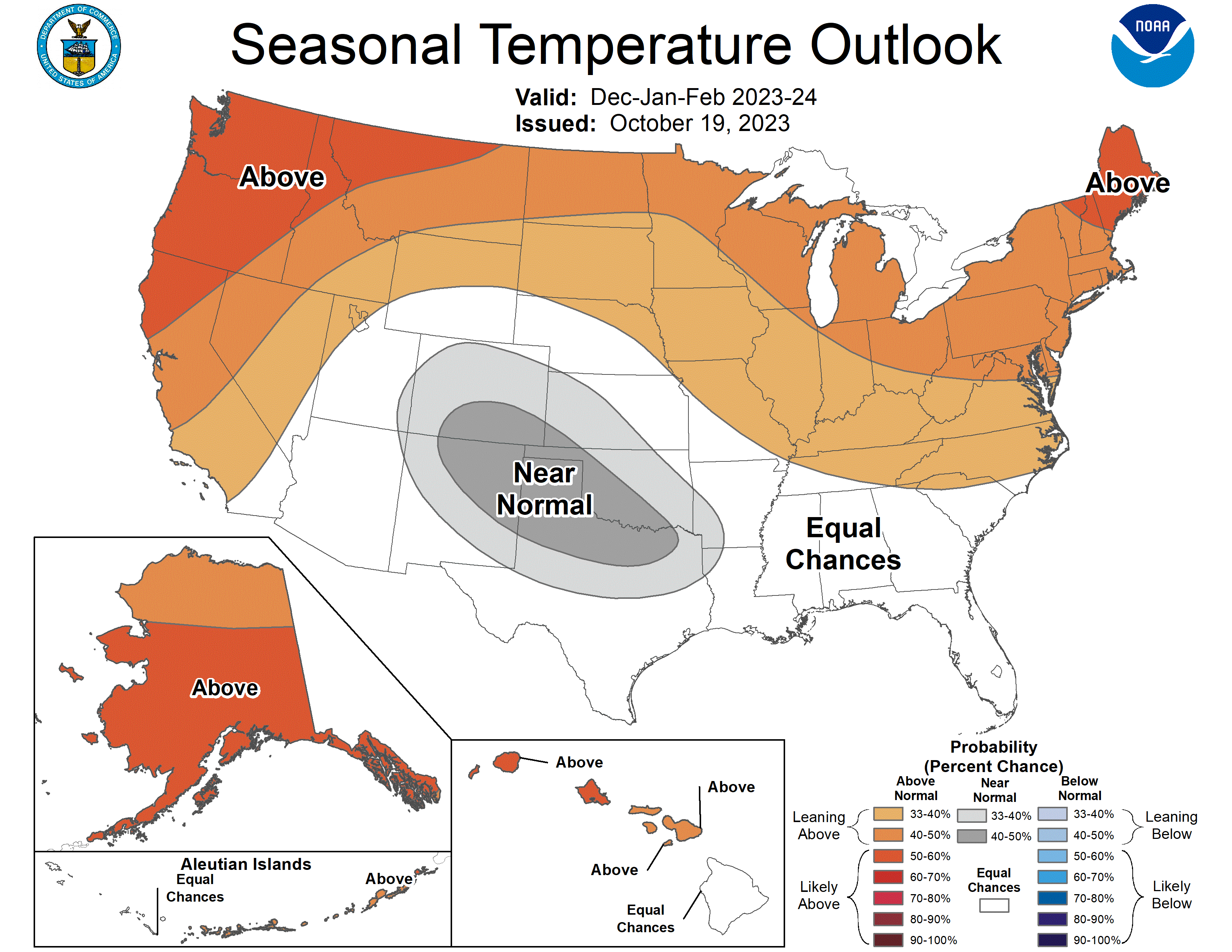
U.S. Temperature outlook

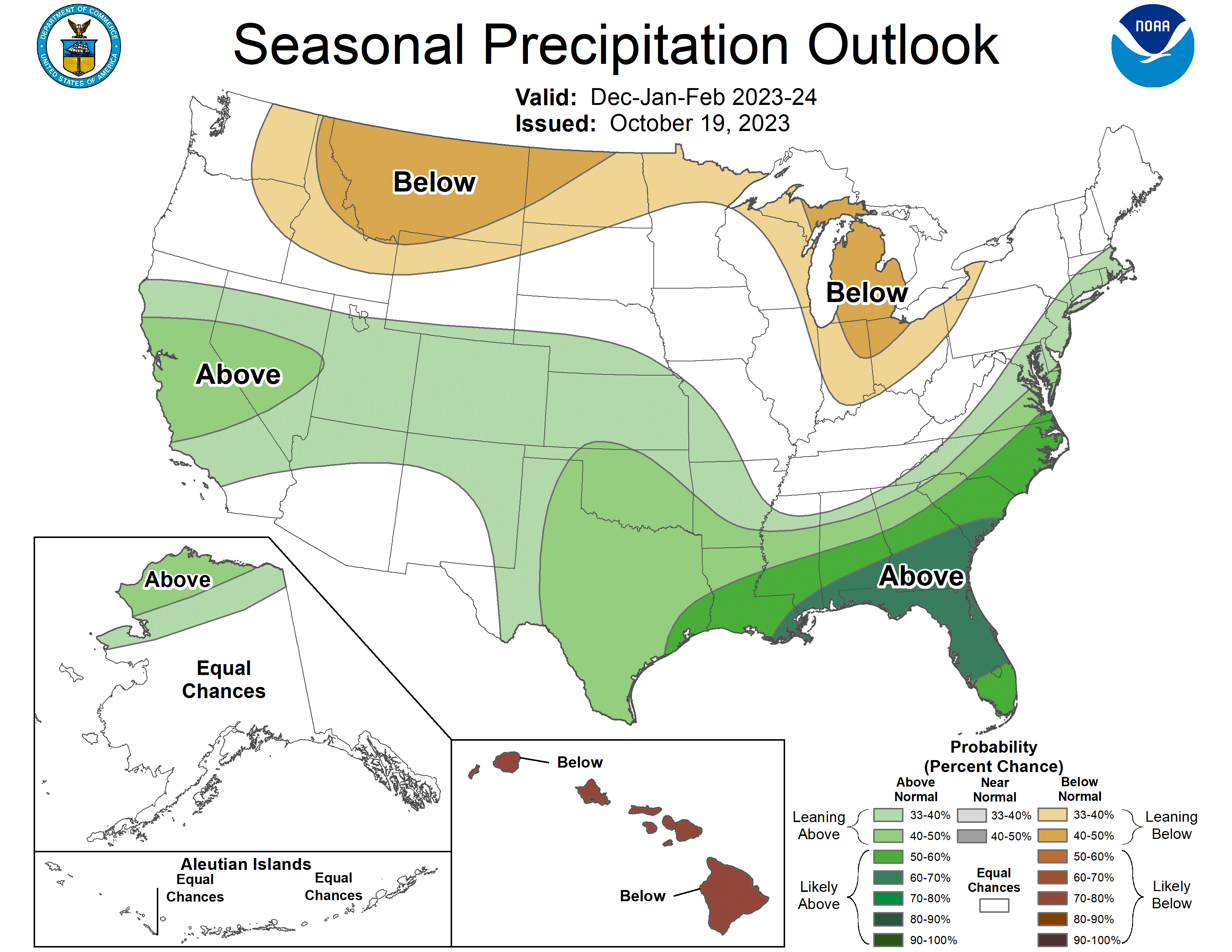
U.S. Precipitation outlook

On October 19, 2023, the National Oceanic and Atmospheric Administration's Climate Prediction Center released its U.S. Winter Outlook. The temperature and precipitation outlooks reflected the likelihood of an El Niño pattern that was already in place during most of the winter. The forecast called for warmer than average temperatures across much of the northern United States, as well as the East Coast, with near-average temperatures in the central United States. The forecast also called for drier than average conditions across the northern United States, and wetter than average conditions in much of the southern United States. Earlier on October 4, 2023, AccuWeather released their winter prediction. They called for an El Niño; their forecast called for the Southeastern United States and California to be wetter than average, some of which could form severe weather outbreaks. The Midwestern United States was predicted to have higher temperatures and drier conditions than average. AccuWeather noted that cities like Boston, New York City, Philadelphia, and Pittsburgh were expected to have more snowfall than the previous winter. The predictions for the West Coast were that storms will occur commonly in the winter.

== Events ==
=== Late November winter storm ===
- Category 0 "Nuisance" (RSI/NOAA: N/A)
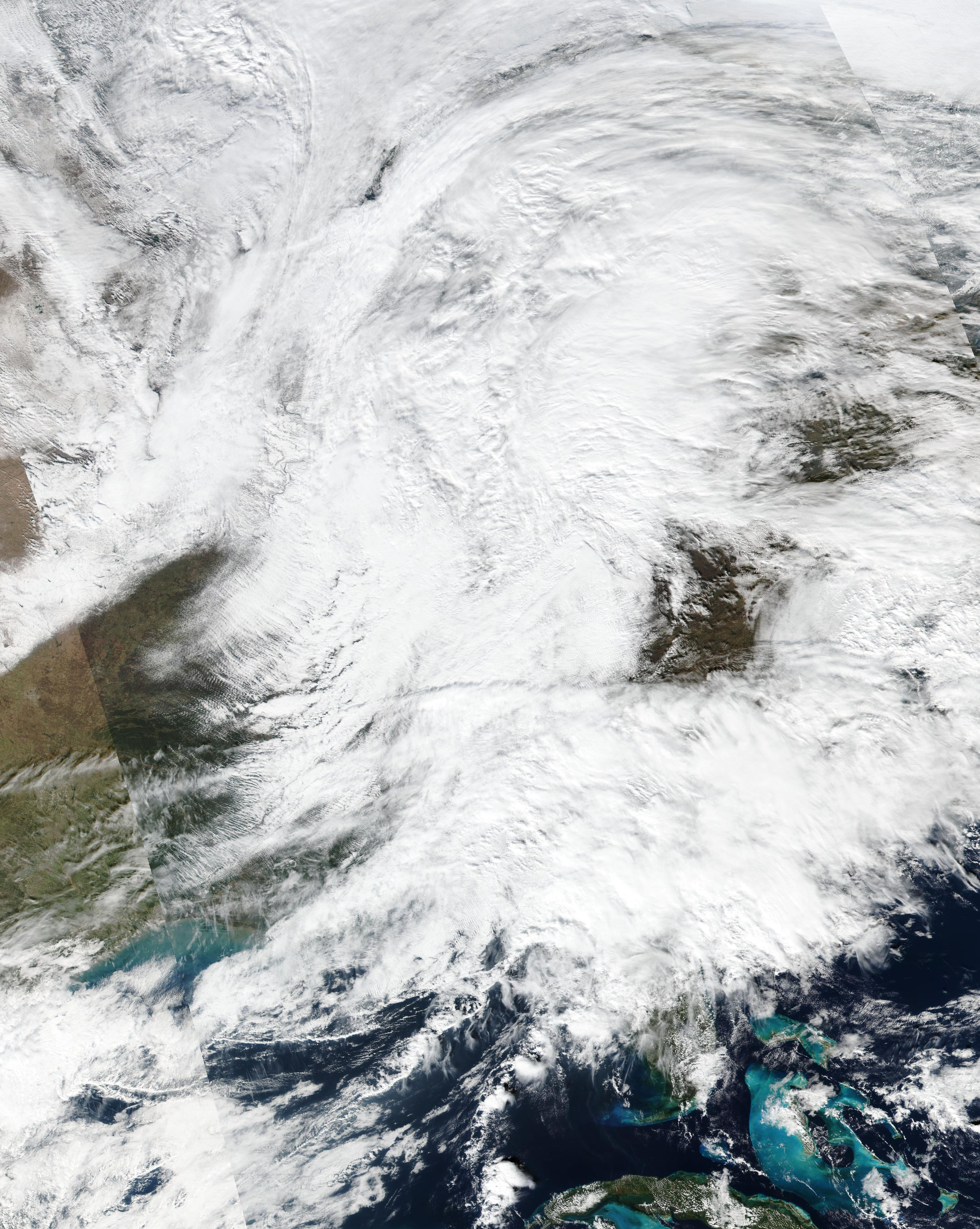
- Duration: November 26 – November 28, 2023
- Maximum snow: 42.7 in (108 cm)
- Fatalities: 4 fatalities

A winter storm affected much of the Great Plains shortly after U.S. Thanksgiving. Three people were killed in fatal car crashes along Interstate 80 in Nebraska, where 14 crashes occurred and portions of the highway were shut down. The state of Wyoming also responded to 125 car crashes within a 48-hour period. Lander, Wyoming received their snowiest day since 1999 when 19 in (48 cm) of snow piled up. The second snowiest November day was realized in Topeka and Wichita. Interstate 135 was briefly shut down due to the snow, as was Wichita Dwight D. Eisenhower National Airport. Further east, the city of Chicago recorded 1.8 in (4.6 cm) of snow on November 26. Further east, lake effect snow fell around Lake Erie, which resulted in a fatal car crash in Pennsylvania, a 20-vehicle pileup near Cleveland and Ontario Highway 403 shutting down. The highest snowfall total was 42.7 in (108 cm) in Highmarket, New York.

=== Mid December nor'easter ===
- Category 0 "Nuisance" (RSI/NOAA: N/A)
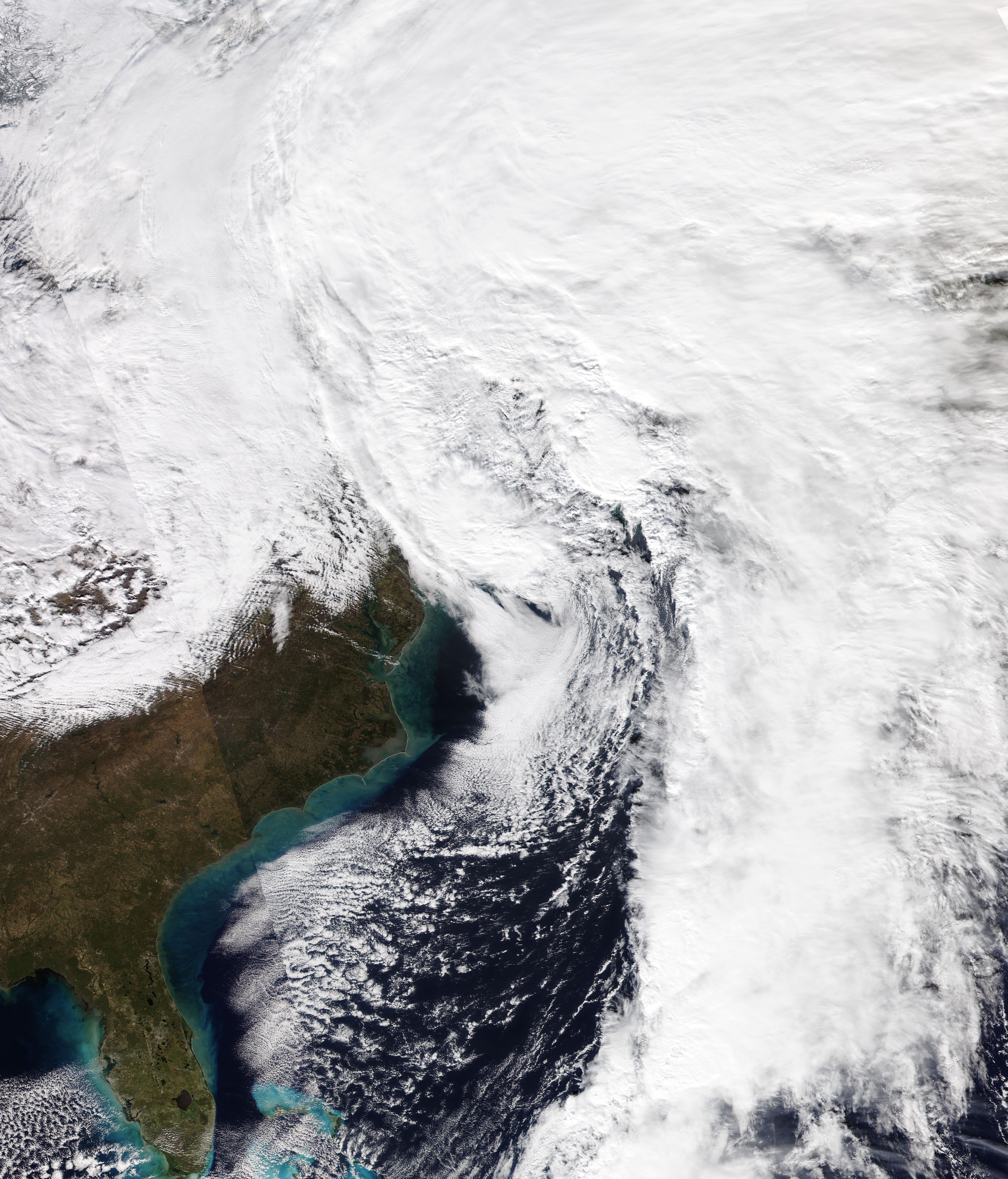
- Duration: December 16 – December 18
- Lowest pressure: 996 mb (29.41 inHg)
- Maximum snow: 5 in (13 cm)
- Fatalities: 4 fatalities

A stationary front was draped over the Gulf of Mexico and Florida Keys, connected to a cold front extending from the northwestern Bahamas to the area southeast of Bermuda, around December 15. A surface trough was also formed in the southwestern Gulf. By 1205 UTC on December 16, a 1013 millibar low-pressure system had developed in the western Gulf. The low was forecast to deepen in the Gulf as it developed gale-force winds, eventually to a maximum of 45 knots, before moving into Florida by December 17, while a cold front connected to the low would exit the Gulf by early December 17. Two high-pressure systems, one a 1033 mb system over the mid-Atlantic states, and the other being the 1029 mb Bermuda High, would form a gradient with the low-pressure system, which had deepened in intensity to 1009 mb by 1805 UTC, that'd result in high, often gale-force, winds over the seas near Florida. The low deepened further, at 1004 mb by 0605 UTC on December 17th, and being 999 mb by 1205 UTC. The areas north of the system's warm front were the sites of intense convection, and thus hours of heavy rainfall, at times reaching rates of 0.75 inches per hour, resulting in flash flooding in some areas and rain accumulations of anywhere from two to four inches.

The system had moved ashore Florida by 1805 UTC, then over Jacksonville, Florida, as a 996 mb low, with its warm front running from the low to around the southeastern Bahamas.

=== Christmas Day blizzard ===
- Category 0 "Nuisance" (RSI/NOAA: N/A)
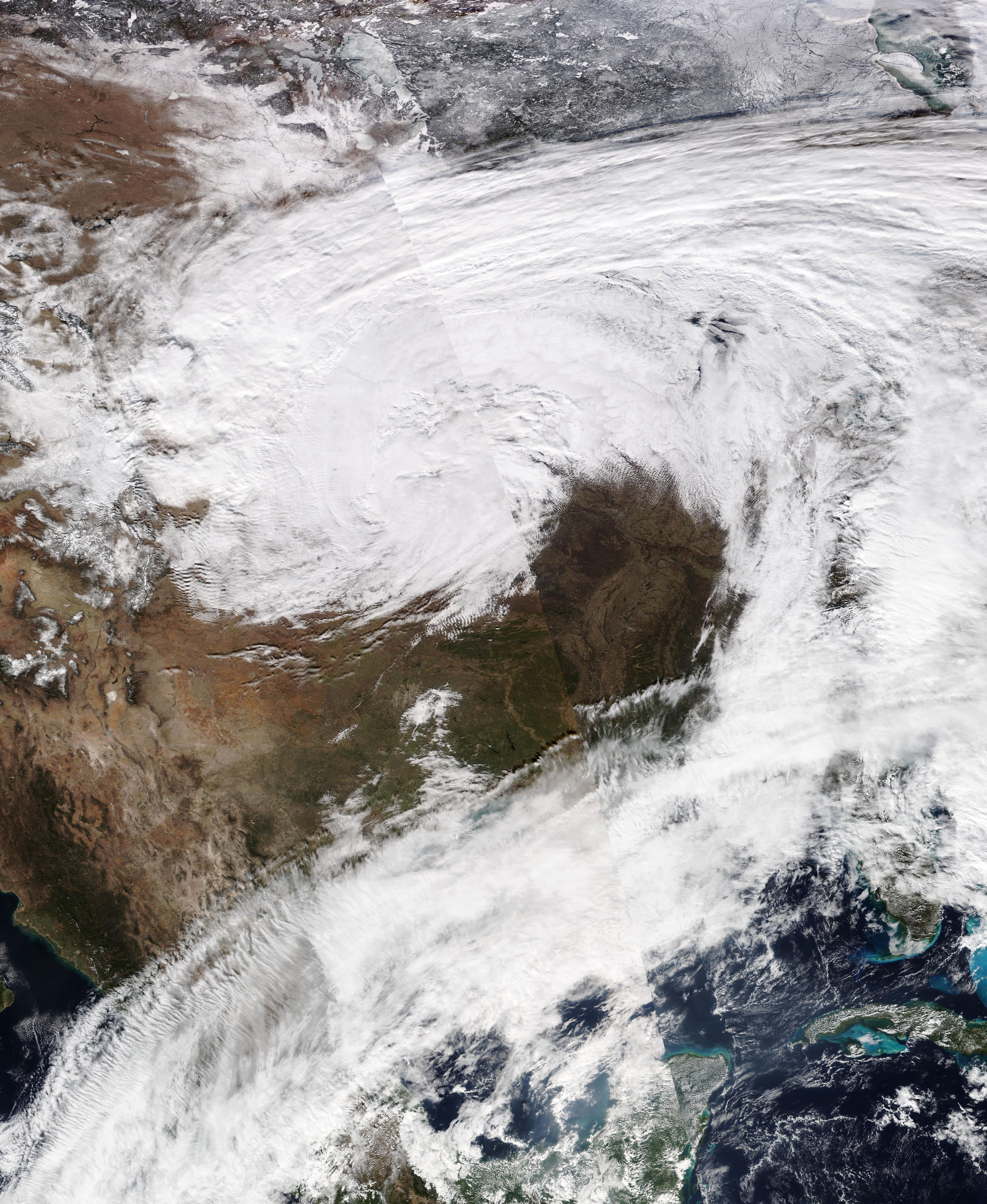
- Duration: December 25 – December 27, 2023
- Lowest pressure: 1003 mb (29.62 inHg)
- Maximum snow: 14.6 in (37 cm)
- Fatalities: 1 fatalities

On Christmas Day, an intensifying low pressure system developing into a blizzard struck the Upper Midwest, dropping more than 12–18 inches (30–46 cm) of snow. Spearfish, South Dakota recorded 14.6 inches (37 cm) of snow. Whiteout conditions and strong gusty winds were reported in states like Nebraska and North and South Dakota due to the storm. Blizzard warnings were issued for a large part of Nebraska and South Dakota as well as parts of northern Kansas. The system caused many accidents as a result, including jackknifed semis on eastbound Interstate 80 in Nebraska, forcing a portion of that road to close for several hours. Significant closures also occurred on Interstate 90 in South Dakota and Interstate 70 in Colorado. Badlands National Park was closed due to the blizzard. The storm also caused one fatality on icy roads in Kansas.

=== Early January nor'easter ===
- Category 0 "Nuisance" (RSI/NOAA: N/A)
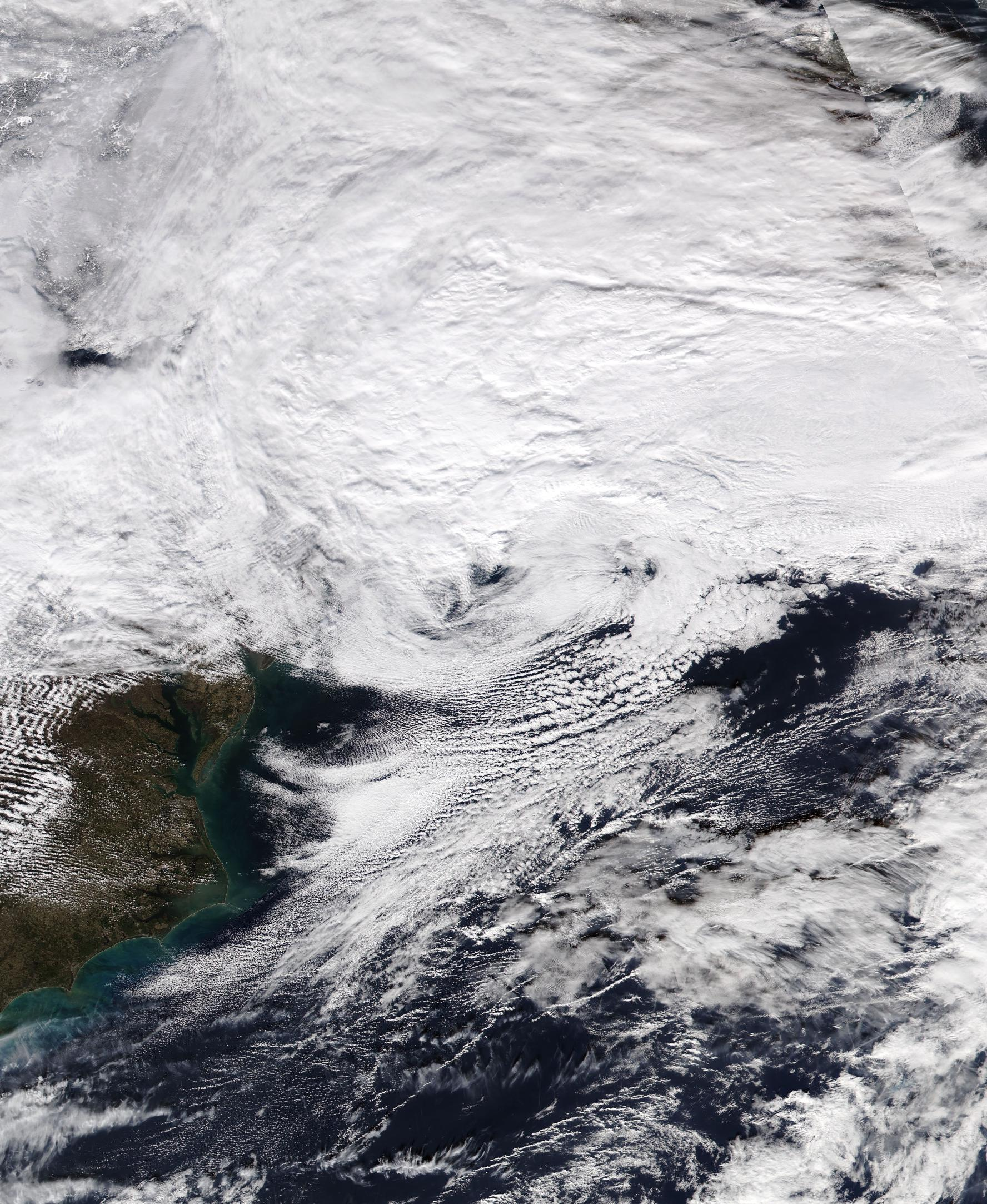
- Duration: January 6 – January 7, 2024
- Lowest pressure: 988 mb (29.18 inHg)
- Maximum snow: 18 in (46 cm)

A winter storm, that became a nor'easter, affected the Northeastern United States from January 6–7, 2024. Multiple locations in several states, including New Jersey, Pennsylvania and Connecticut recorded 1 foot (30 cm) of snow. 13,000 customers also lost power in Massachusetts. The storm also ended the longest stretch without measurable snow in Harrisburg, Pennsylvania and the longest stretch without 1 in (2.5 cm) of snow in State College, Pennsylvania. Portions of the Massachusetts Turnpike closed due to snow. In addition, planned construction along the New York Thruway between Orange County and Ulster County was postponed by a week. Despite over 1 ft (30 cm) of snow in Port Jervis, New York, the record snow drought in New York City continued, as Central Park only picked up 0.2 in (0.51 cm) of snow. Boston measured 3.8 in (9.7 cm) during the snow event, with 5.6 in (14 cm) of snow in Providence, Rhode Island and 10.4 in (26 cm) of snow in Hartford, Connecticut. Areas more north and inland of Boston, however, saw significantly higher snowfall totals from the storm, such as 15.5 in (39 cm) in Worcester, 15.1 in (38 cm) in Fitchburg, 13.0 in (33 cm) in Newburyport, and 17.4 in (44 cm) in Groveland. Coastal New Hampshire and Maine received similar totals, with 12.8 in (33 cm) measured in both Portsmouth, New Hampshire, and Portland, Maine. In total, 702 flights were cancelled due to the storm, with 1122 delays.

=== January winter storms ===
From January 8–19, following a pattern change, four consecutive winter storms affected much of the country with rain, snow, blizzard conditions and flooding.

==== First storm (January 8–10) ====
- Category 1 "Notable" (RSI/NOAA: 2.38)
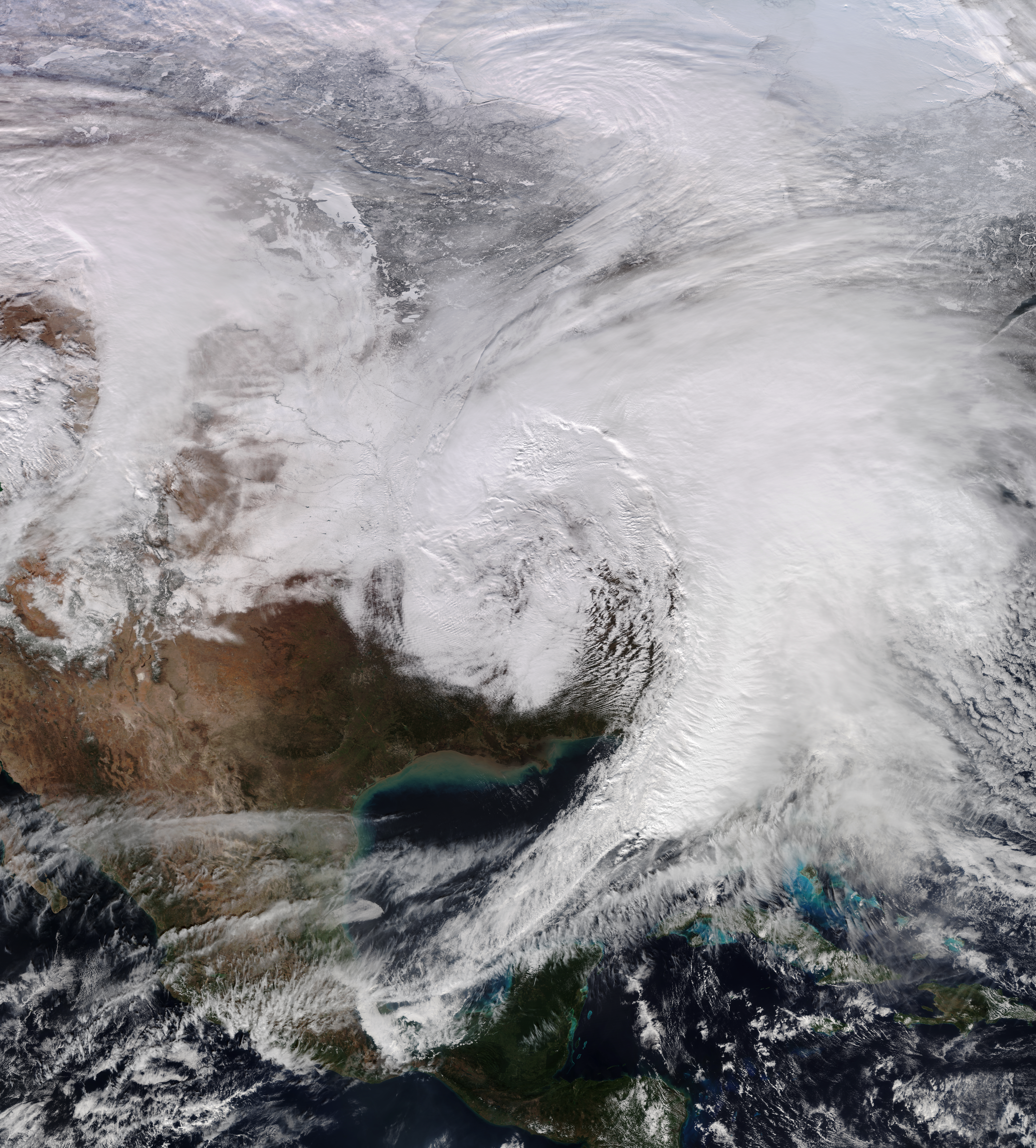
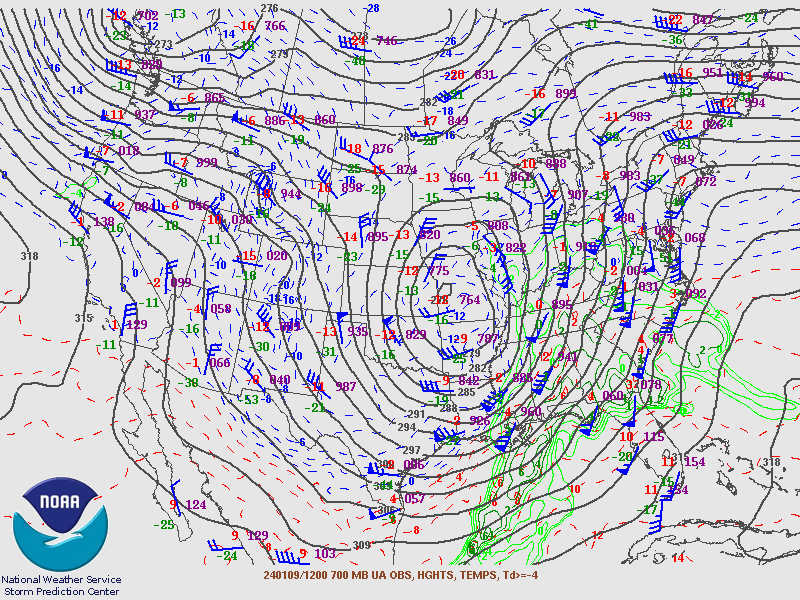
- Duration: January 8 – January 10, 2024
- Lowest pressure: 976 mb (28.82 inHg)
- Maximum snow: 21 in (53 cm)
- Fatalities: 2 fatalities
- Damage: $2.7 billion (2024 USD)

The first winter storm, named Winter Storm Finn by The Weather Channel, hit the Midwest, Southeast, and East Coast on January 8–10, 2024. Interstate 70 was closed from Watkins, Colorado to the Kansas state line due to the storm. Winds in Colorado gusted up to 80 mph (130 km/h), while winds in New Mexico reached 76 mph (122 km/h). Snow drifts in the Oklahoma Panhandle reached 4–5 feet (1.2–1.5 m) due to wind and heavy snowfall. In the Eastern United States, many states had over 40,000 customers lose power, with 130,000 power outages in New York and 90,000 power outages in Pennsylvania. Western New York was hit hard, with winds gusting to 74 mph (119 km/h) in Dunkirk and 78 mph (126 km/h) in Watertown; the National Weather Service's Buffalo office warned in an Area Forecast Discussion that gusts from the southeast descending from Tug Hill could reach "potentially generational" levels. Maine experienced the storm as a "sou'easter", with the strongest winds occurring simultaneously with astronomical hide tide, leading to widespread coastal flooding. Gale-force winds occurred along the coast, especially in the Down East region, further contributing to coastal flooding, erosion, and structural damage.

In total, about 1,350 flights were canceled, more than 8,700 more flights were delayed, about two dozen tornadoes were reported, and at least 6 people died because of the storm, with 2 being winter storm related.

==== Second storm (January 10–13) ====
- Category 0 "Nuisance" (RSI/NOAA: N/A)
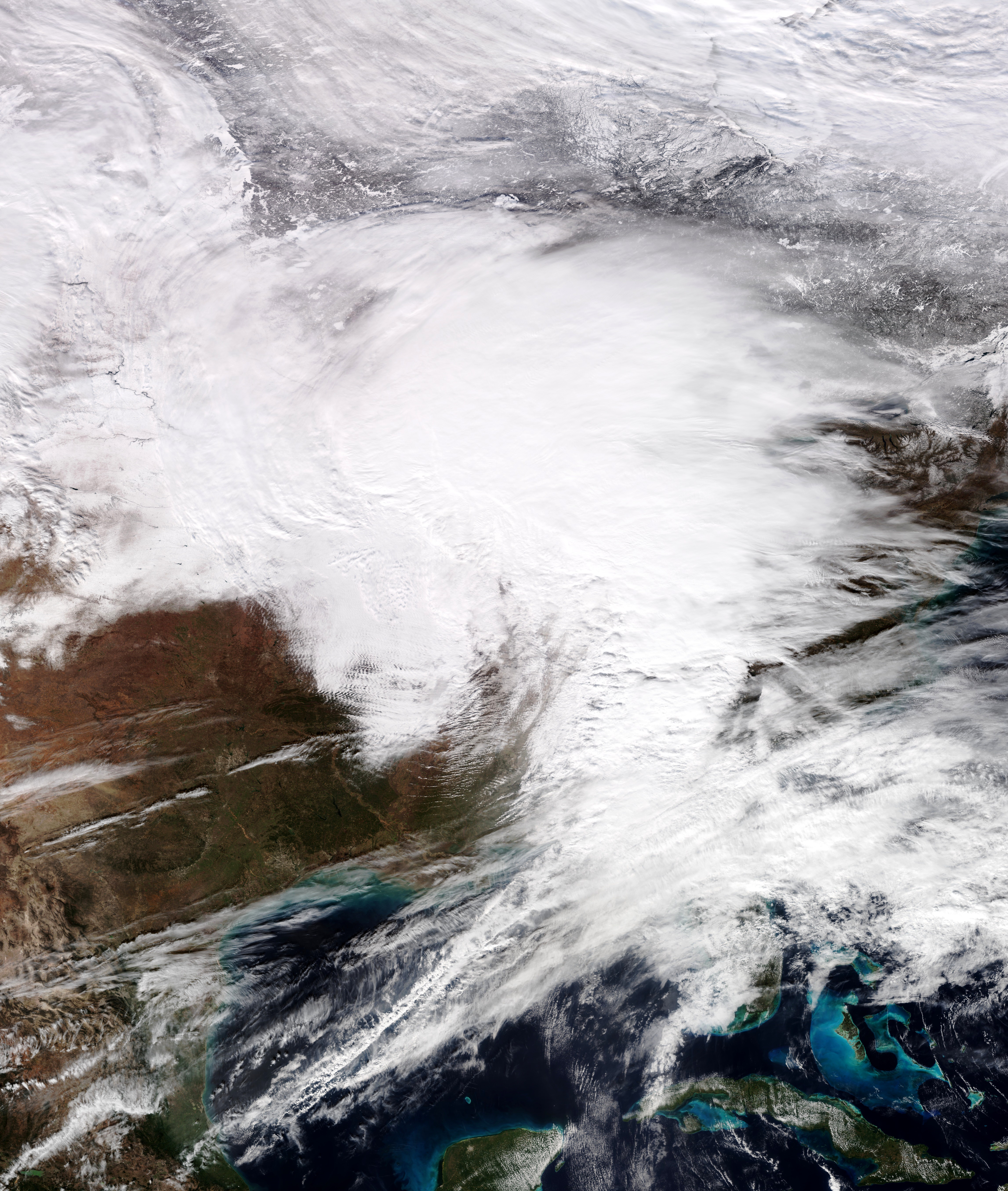
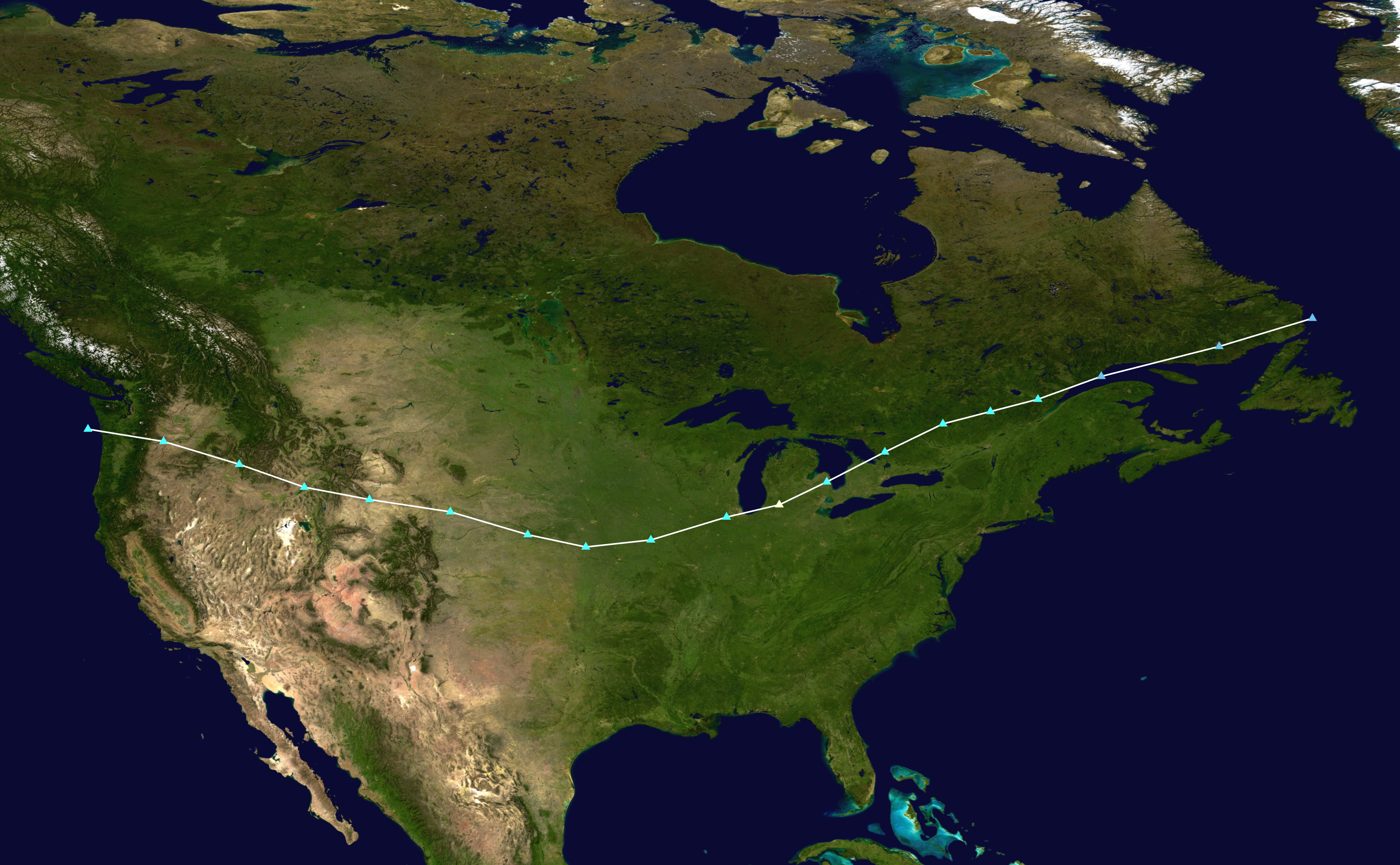
- Duration: January 10 – January 13, 2024
- Lowest pressure: 981 mb (28.97 inHg)
- Maximum snow: 41 in (100 cm)
- Fatalities: 5 fatalities
- Damage: $70.3 million (2024 USD)

The second system, named Winter Storm Gerri by The Weather Channel, which brought blizzard conditions to some areas, hit most of the U.S. starting on January 10, 2024, sweeping from the Northwest into the Midwest, Great Lakes area, and the East Coast. Almost every U.S. state became under some form of weather alert.

The storm resulted in blizzard warnings for Oregon and Washington's mountain areas for the first time since 2012. Crater Lake National Park closed due to the winter storm. Following the storm, record cold conditions were observed in Washington, with Seattle observing a low of 13 °F (−11 °C), their coldest temperature since 1990. Ski resorts in on Mount Baker closed due to the cold as well. More than 443,000 customers lost power from Oregon to Michigan, with 111,000 outages in Oregon alone. Portions of Interstate 70 in Kansas were closed due to the winter weather. Moline, Illinois recorded their second snowiest day on record on January 12, with 15.4 in (39 cm) of snow. High tides due to the storm in New York City resulted in parts of Hudson River Park being closed and ferries to the Statue of Liberty being suspended. Coastal Maine was once again, for the second time in 4 days, affected by widespread coastal flooding and gale-force winds, leading to structural destruction and coastal bank erosion. Record tide gauge levels of 14.57 ft were recorded in Portland, causing the 2024 Portland Flood. The storm, combined with the January 9th storm, created an estimated US$70.3 million in damages for the state of Maine, prompting a major disaster declaration to be declared in the state by President Joe Biden.

Nationwide, over 2000 flights were canceled on January 12 and over another 1000 were canceled on January 13. A state of emergency and travel ban was declared in Western New York, forcing the playoff game between the Pittsburgh Steelers and the Buffalo Bills to be postponed from January 14 at 1pm to January 15 at 4:30pm. In addition, an NHL game between the Toronto Maple Leafs and Detroit Red Wings suffered a 52-minute delay. Portions of Queen Elizabeth Way were also closed. Five people died due to the storm: three in Oregon, one person in California, and one in Wisconsin.

==== Third storm (January 13–16) ====
- Category 1 "Notable" (RSI/NOAA: 1.437)
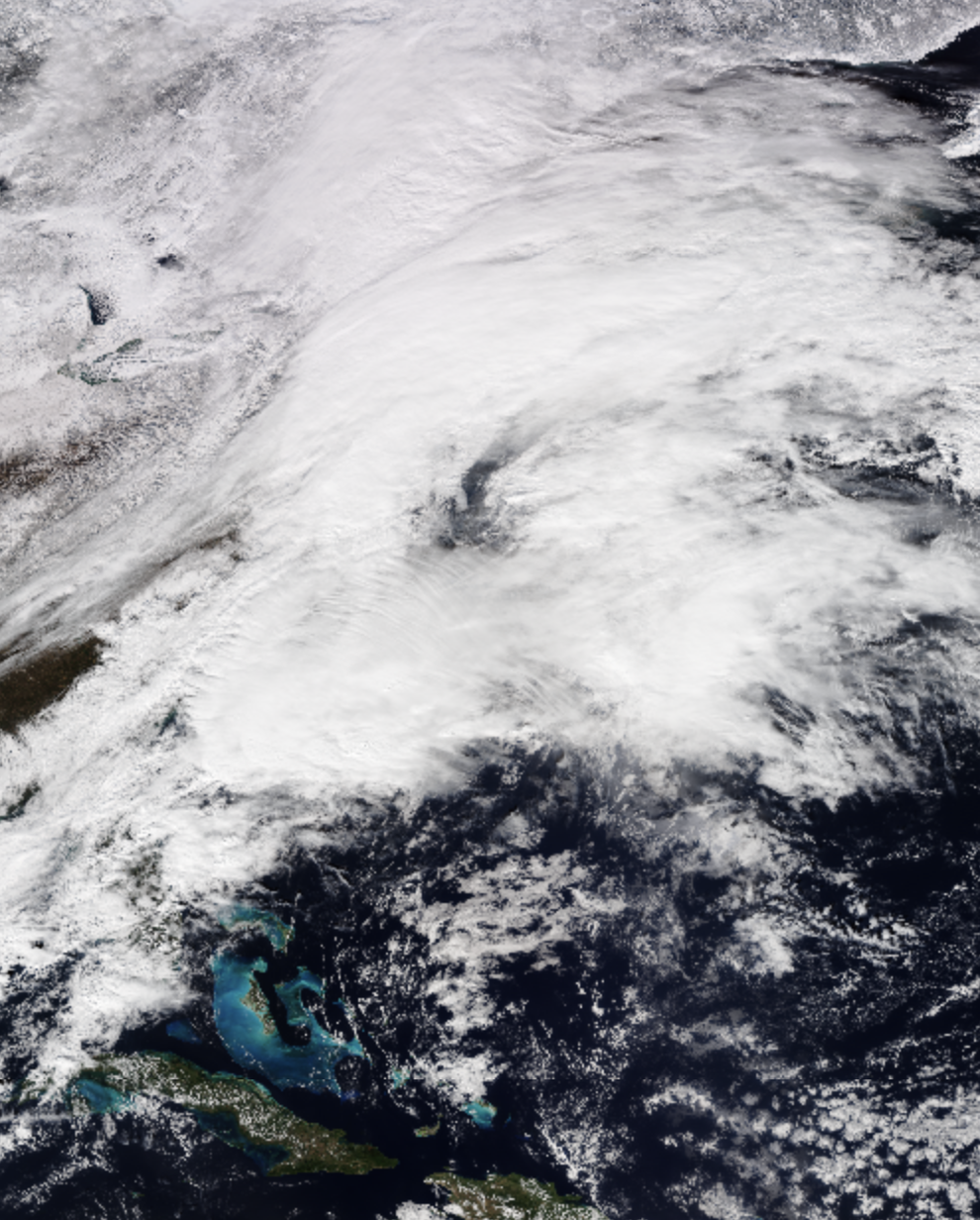
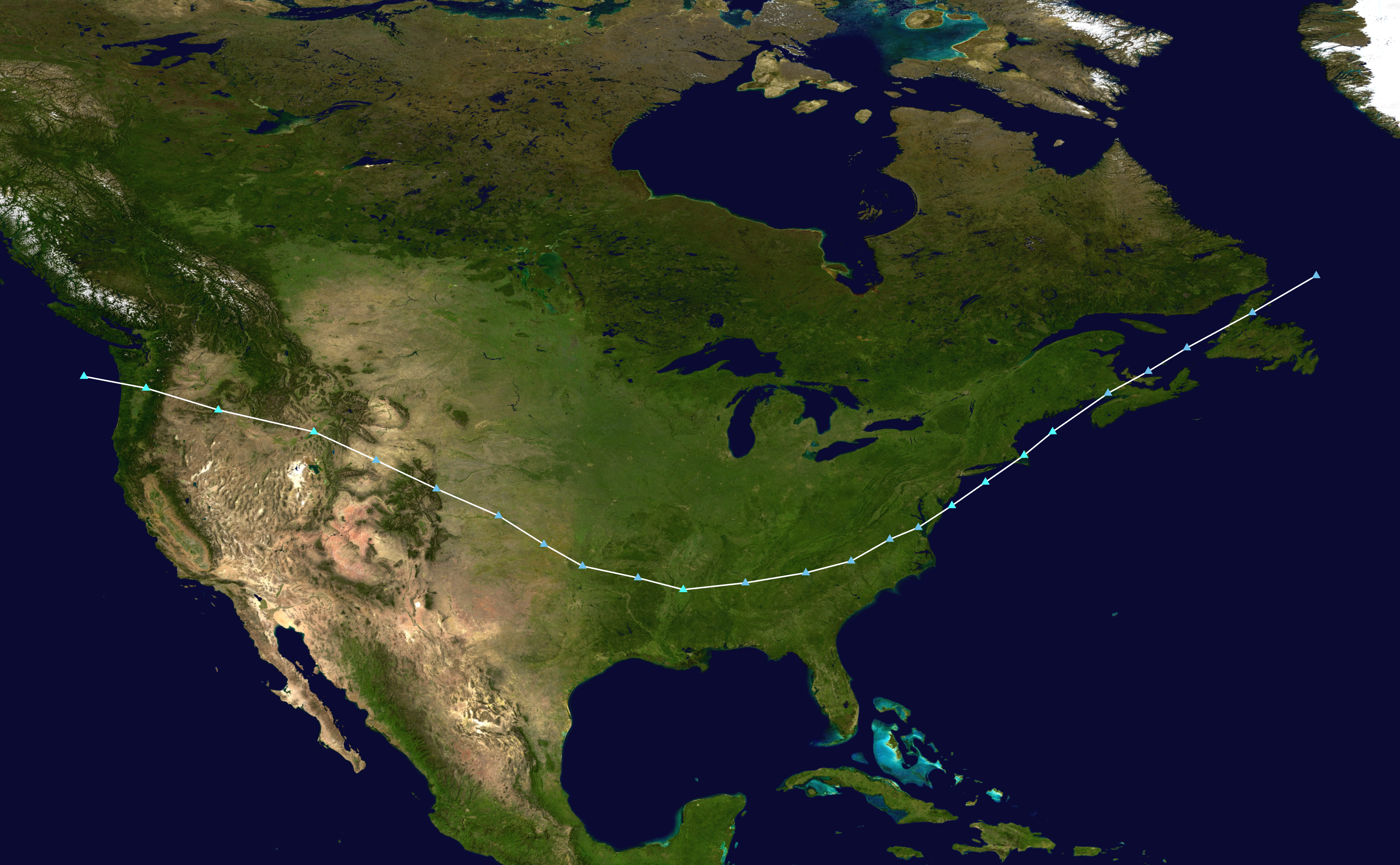
- Duration: January 13 – January 16, 2024
- Lowest pressure: 983 mb (29.03 inHg)
- Maximum snow: 49.5 in (126 cm)
- Fatalities: 30 fatalities
- Damage: $3 billion (2024 USD)

The winter storm in Oregon, named Winter Storm Heather by The Weather Channel, resulted in two fatalities, 161,000 customers losing power, and all MAX Light Rail service being suspended for three days. Winds in the Columbia River Gorge reached 80 mph (130 km/h), with gusts over 50 mph (80 km/h) in Portland. Many cities in the Southeastern United States, such as Little Rock, Arkansas and Nashville, Tennessee closed schools. In the Northeastern United States, the storm snapped record long streaks without 1 in (2.5 cm) of snow in several cities, with a little over 1 inch (2.5 cm) recorded in Atlantic City, 3.3 in (8.4 cm) of snow in Philadelphia and 4.9 in (12 cm) of snow in Baltimore, with Washington D.C. recording 4.1 in (10 cm) of snow. Central Park reported 1.2 in (3.0 cm) of snow on January 16, their first inch of snow in a single day since February 13, 2022. The storm total there was 1.6 in (4.1 cm).

In total, at least 30 fatalities have been linked to this storm system, including 14 in Tennessee, five in Pennsylvania, three in New York, three in Oregon, and one in Kansas.

==== Fourth storm (January 16–19) ====
- Category 0 "Nuisance" (RSI/NOAA: N/A)
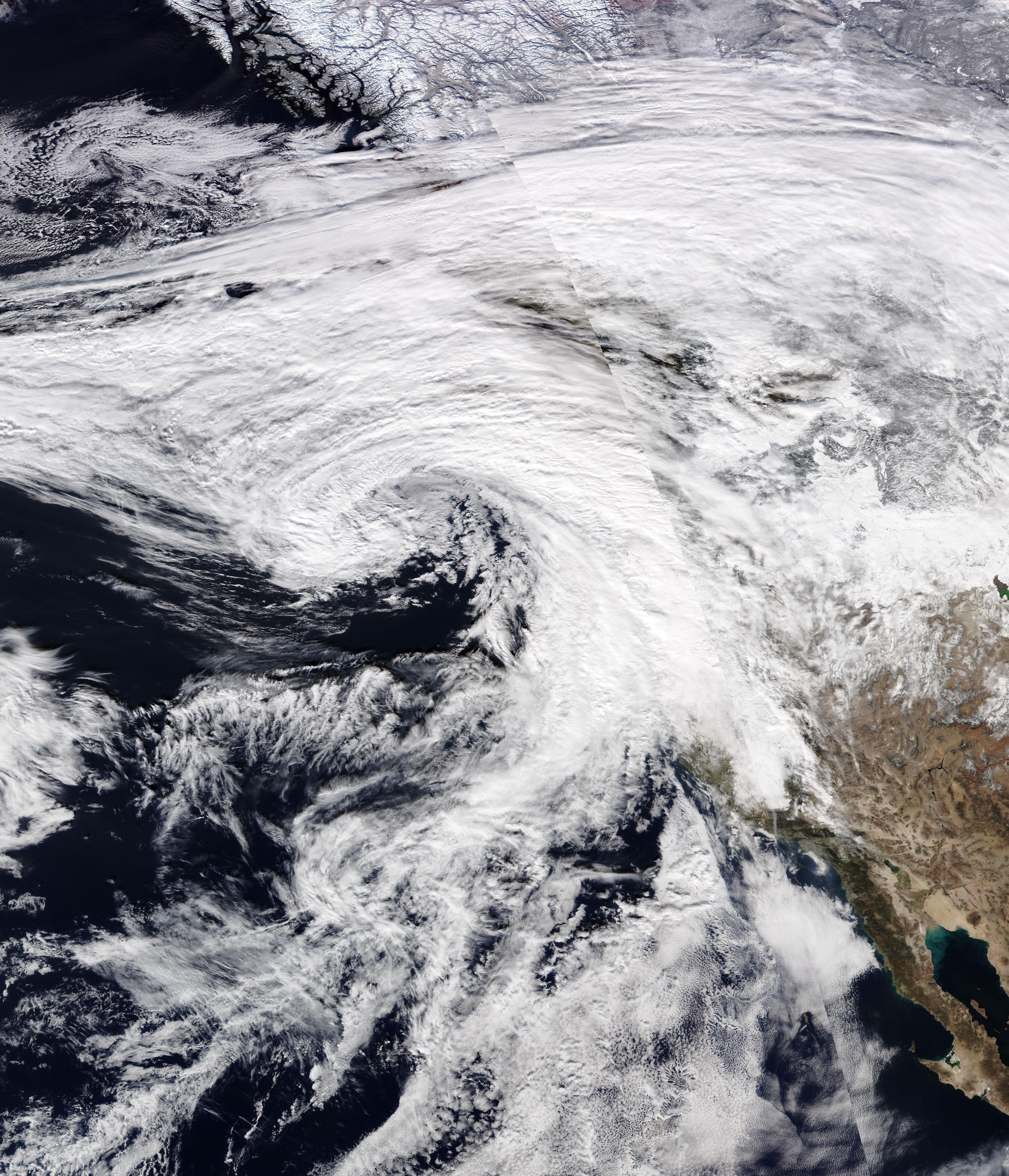
- Duration: January 16 – January 19, 2024
- Maximum snow: 7 in (18 cm)
- Fatalities: 3 fatalities

Right after the previous storm departed the East Coast, another snowstorm affected the Pacific Northwest, with significant ice in Oregon and parts of Washington. Over 80,000 customers in Oregon lost power, and 3 people were killed when a power line fell on a car during the storm. Further east, snow squalls led to numerous pileups in Nebraska. Further east, a state of emergency was declared due to the winter storm in the Philadelphia metropolitan area, resulting in hundreds of schools closing, as well as attractions such as National Constitution Center and Elmwood Park Zoo. The winter storm also resulted in speed restrictions on portions of the New Jersey Turnpike. In total, 4.6 in (12 cm) of snow fell in Philadelphia, with around 2–3 in (5.1–7.6 cm) of snow in the Lehigh Valley, up to 6 in (15 cm) of snow in New Jersey and up to 7 in (18 cm) of snow in Delaware. Further south, 4.2 in (11 cm) of snow fell in Baltimore and 3.7 in (9.4 cm) of snow fell in Washington D.C. The snow in DC led to a ground stop at Ronald Reagan Washington National Airport. Further north, despite a travel advisory in New York City, only 0.4 in (1.0 cm) of snow fell, with 1.3 in (3.3 cm) of snow at LaGuardia Airport. Snowfall totals reached around 2 in (5.1 cm) in Chester, New York.

=== Mid-January cold wave ===
Freezing temperatures affected campaign events leading up to the Iowa Caucuses on January 15. In addition, the cold temperatures resulted in the 4th coldest NFL game on record between the Kansas City Chiefs and Miami Dolphins, with kickoff temperature being −4 °F (−20 °C). Fifteen people were hospitalized due to the cold temperatures during the game. Wind chills following the storm reached as low as −60 °F (−51 °C) in Montana, and wind chills were still −9 °F (−23 °C) as far south as Dallas on January 14. On January 13, Dillon, Montana reached an all-time record low of −42 °F (−41 °C), while Bozeman, Montana recorded their second coldest temperature at −45 °F (−43 °C). That same day, Dickinson, North Dakota reached a −70 °F (−57 °C) wind chill, their coldest since the wind chill formula was updated in 2001, and a −33 °F (−36 °C) air temperature, a daily record and their coldest temperature since 1990. On January 16, Houston dropped to a daily record low of 19 °F (−7 °C). The cold wave and snow that the storm brought with it led to at least 55 fatalities.

=== Early February Canadian blizzard ===
- Category 0 "Nuisance" (RSI/NOAA: N/A)
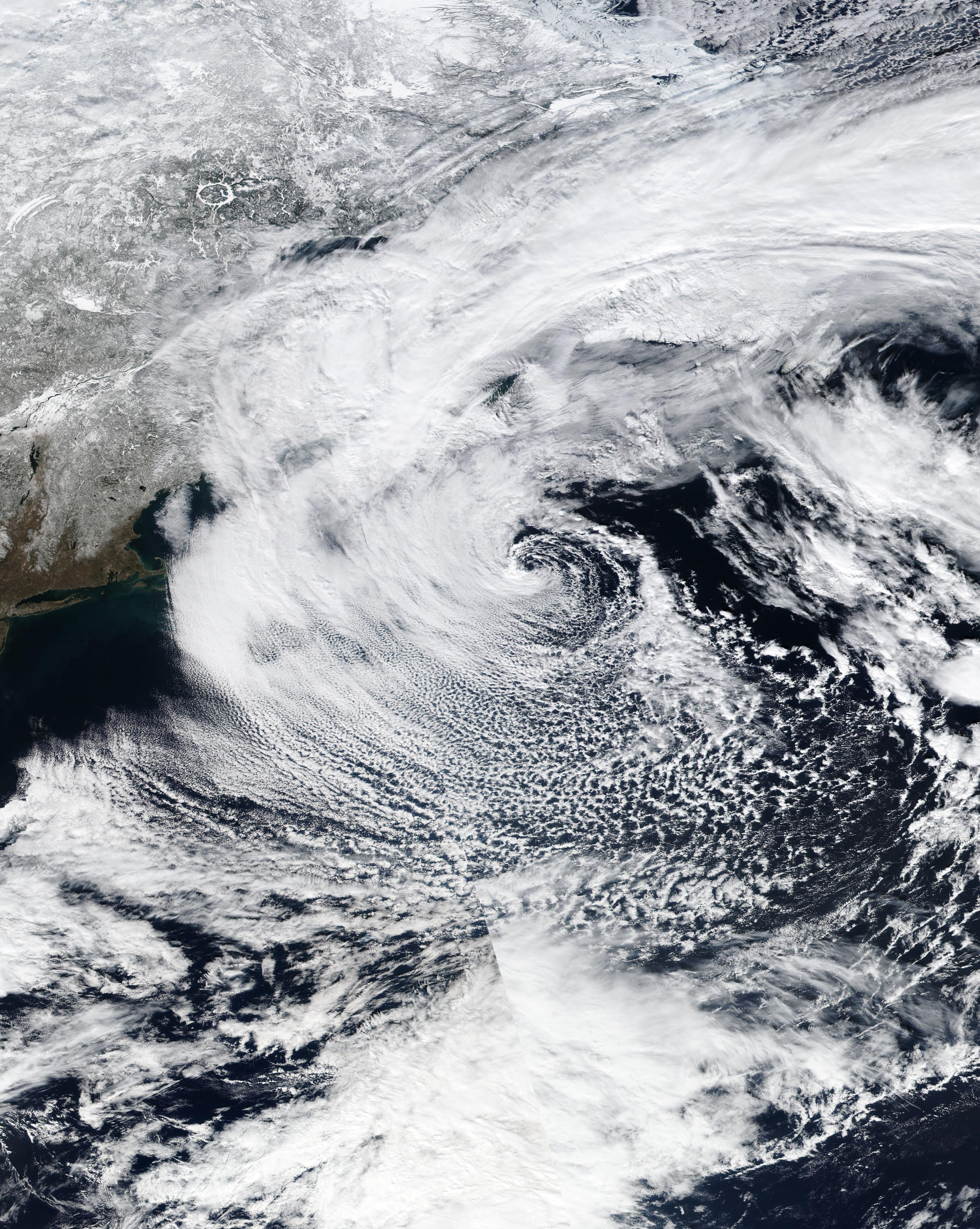
- Duration: February 2 – February 5, 2024
- Lowest pressure: 956 mb (28.23 inHg)
- Maximum snow: 59 in (150 cm)

A slow-moving significant blizzard affected much of Atlantic Canada from February 2–5, dumping 2–5 feet (61–152 cm; 24–60 in) of snow as the system stalled south of the Canadian Maritimes and Nova Scotia. A peak accumulation of 150 centimetres (59 in) was measured in the town of Sydney, Nova Scotia. Blizzard-like conditions occurred across the eastern portions of the region as the system slowly moved east, and schools were closed and many roadside services were suspended during the duration of the storm. Hundreds of 9-1-1 calls were made during the height of the blizzard, particularly in the regions with heavier snowfall and gusty winds.

=== Early February West Coast atmospheric rivers ===
- Category 0 "Nuisance" (RSI/NOAA: N/A)
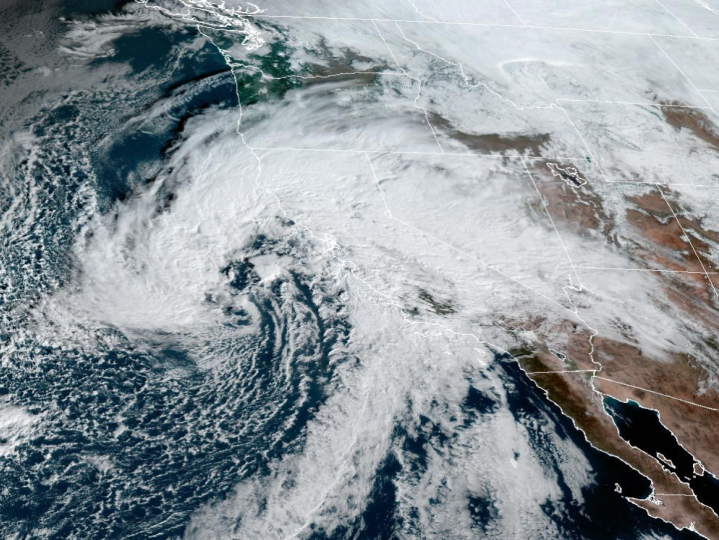
- Duration: February 1 – February 7, 2024
- Maximum snow: 24–48 in (61–122 cm)
- Fatalities: 9 fatalities
- Damage: $3 billion (2024 USD)

A Pineapple Express storm hit the state from February 1 to February 2, 2024, before moving over the United States and settling over the I-25 corridor in Colorado, where heavy snow fell. Another one was expected to hit February 3 and last until February 5, with the National Weather Service calling it "potentially life-threatening." Other news sources estimated that Los Angeles could receive six-months' worth of rain in the 48-hour period, while the Sierra Nevada mountains were generally expected to get 1 to 3 ft (30 to 91 cm) of snow, with over 4 feet (120 cm) of snow expected in higher elevations, such as Mammoth Lakes, CA. Parts of the San Bernardino Mountains' foothills could receive 10 to 12 in (250 to 300 mm) of rain. Total damages amounted to around $3 billion.

=== Pre-Valentine's Day nor'easter ===
- Category 0 "Nuisance" (RSI/NOAA: N/A)
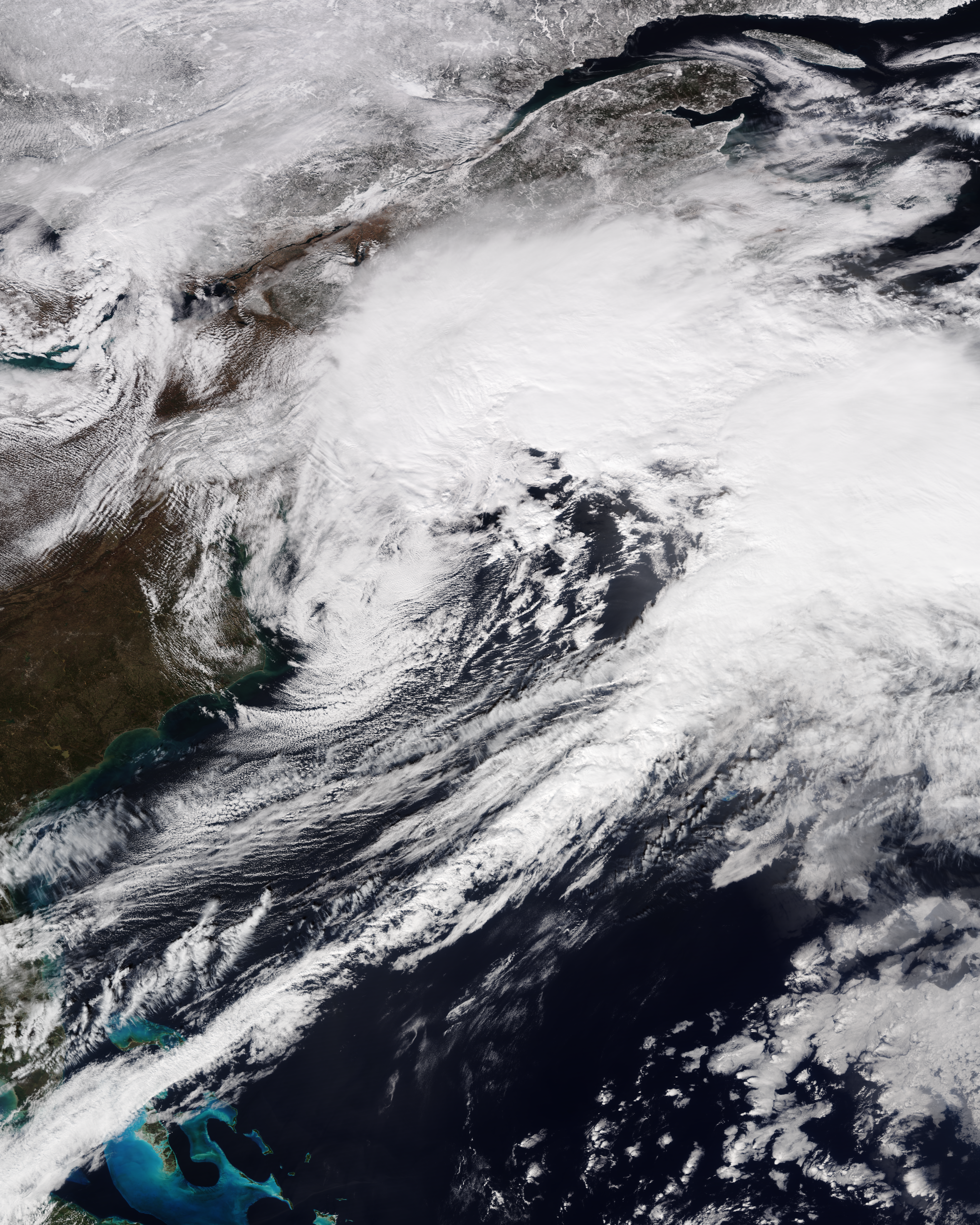
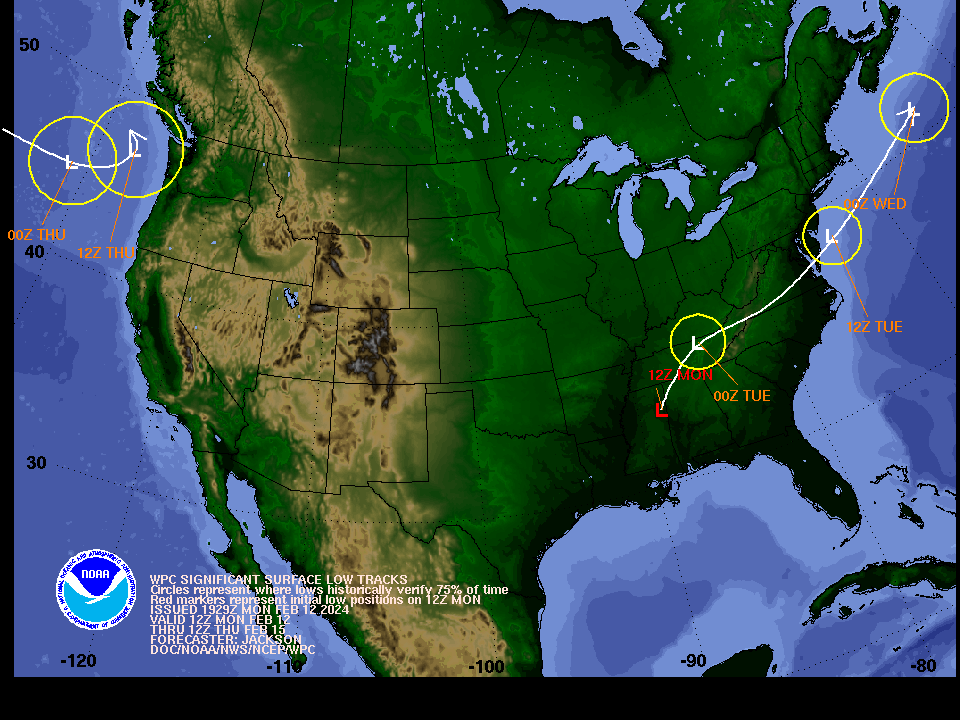
- Duration: February 10 – February 13, 2024
- Lowest pressure: 956 mb (28.23 inHg)
- Maximum snow: 15.2 in (39 cm)
- Fatalities: 1 fatalities

A weak area of low pressure developed along the Gulf Coast and trekked northeastwards throughout February 11–12 across the Southeast as the system as a whole continued eastward. At 09:00 UTC, the Weather Prediction Center deemed it necessary to begin issue storm summary bulletins for the winter storm. As the system became a nor'easter and moved offshore on February 13, rapid deepening – known also as "bombing out" – commenced overnight, with the central pressure falling from 991 mb (29.3 inHg) at 09:00 UTC on February 13 to 964 mb (28.5 inHg) at 03:00 UTC on February 14, a drop of 27 millibars (0.80 inHg) in 18 hours. As this process commenced during the early morning hours on February 13, precipitation rapidly switched from rain to heavy snowfall along much of the Mid-Atlantic, with rates approaching 1–2 inches (2.5–5.1 cm) per hour in the northwestern and northeastern portions of New Jersey and Pennsylvania, respectively, which led to the heaviest snowfall totals of the event in those areas. The nor'easter moved quickly, with precipitation and snowfall ending across the Mid-Atlantic and eventually New England by evening that day; consequently, the WPC terminated storm summary bulletins for the departing nor'easter at 03:00 UTC on February 14.

Many cities in the Mid-Atlantic, particularly New York City, were expected to receive the heaviest snowfall accumulation in at least two years due to the nor'easter, although the storm was notable for being difficult to predict in the aforementioned regions in the hours leading up to the event. Flights were cancelled or delayed across the Mid-Atlantic, and millions spanning from Pennsylvania to Massachusetts were placed under winter storm warnings. Over 175,000 people across the Northeast lost power, due to the heavy wet nature of the snow, and the nor'easter was responsible for at least one death so far as of February 13. Separately, the system dumped at least 1 foot (12 in; 30 cm) in parts of Texas and Oklahoma causing severe impacts in the region as well.

February 13 saw the storm continue to move north and hit Atlantic Canada. Much snow and wind was forecasted, and Nova Scotia received more than a foot of snow. The storm went on to strongly affect Newfoundland and Labrador.

=== Mid-February Mid-Atlantic winter storm ===
- Category 0 "Nuisance" (RSI/NOAA: N/A)
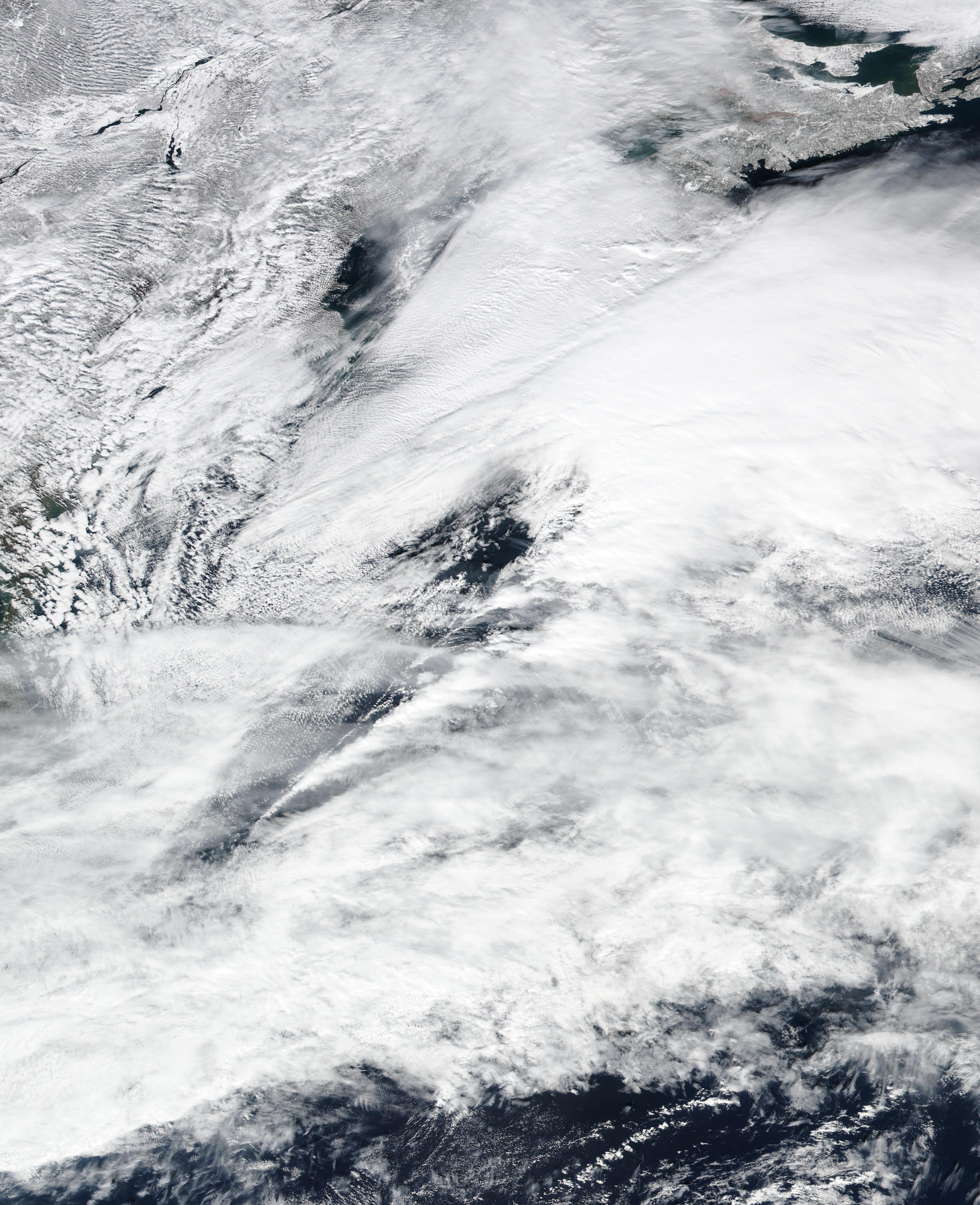
- Duration: February 15 – February 17, 2024
- Maximum snow: 13.8 in (35 cm)

A surprise major winter storm began affecting the Mid-Atlantic during the overnight hours of February 16–17. A fast-moving clipper system moved through the Midwest early on February 16, dropping 3–5 in (7.6–12.7 cm) of snow with isolated higher amounts near the cities of St. Louis, Missouri and Kansas City, resulting in Gateway Arch National Park closing at 2 p.m. on February 16. The winter storm moved eastwards into the Ohio Valley where similar accumulations were reported. In Indianapolis, a fatality was reported on icy roads. The main event began later that day as the system approached the Mid-Atlantic states. Frontogenesis occurred spawning a very heavy snowband reminiscent of those in lake-effect snow, which pushed into the eastern regions of Pennsylvania, central New Jersey – including the town of New Brunswick – and the southern parts of Staten Island, New York and western Long Island, just south of New York City. Extreme snowfall rates of 4–5 in (10–13 cm) per hour occurred in this band, which the Mount Holly National Weather Service (NWS) office described as "serious snowfall rates" and by amateur meteorologists in the region as "historic".

The heaviest snow fell in Center Valley, Pennsylvania, with 13.8 in (35 cm), with 13 in (33 cm) of snow in Township, New Jersey, 12.1 in (31 cm) in Allentown and 9.9 in (25 cm) of snow in Coney Island, New York. Snowfall in New York City varied heavily, with 6.1 in (15 cm) of snow at John F. Kennedy International Airport and 2 in (5.1 cm) of snow in Central Park. The winter storm at JFK Airport, in combination with a nor'easter four days earlier, pushed the site to their 19th snowiest February on record. 2.2 in (5.6 cm) of snow fell in Baltimore, and 3.5 in (8.9 cm) of snow fell in Philadelphia. The winter weather resulted in the National Park Service shutting down portions of George Washington Parkway.

=== Late February–early March blizzard ===
A major winter storm began to affect the Western United States on February 29, with blizzard conditions and several feet of snow expected in the mountainous regions of the state of California. Blizzard warnings were issued for a majority of the Sierra Mountains, including Lake Tahoe, California. The storm resulted in over 100 mi (160 km) of Interstate 80 shutting down, and Yosemite National Park and the Giant Forest were also briefly shut down. The blizzard brought very strong winds to the mountainous regions – a near-record-breaking wind gust of 190 mph (310 km/h) was reported at Palisades Tahoe at an elevation of 8,700 feet (2,700 m) late on March 1.

=== Late March winter storm ===
On March 21 and 22, a winter storm brought up to 8 in (20 cm) of snow to the Twin Cities. As the storm moved eastwards, heavy snow fell throughout the Northeastern United States on March 23, particularly in Northern New England and Upstate New York. The heaviest snow accumulation totaled 33.1 in (84 cm) in West Windsor, Vermont, with 29 in (74 cm) of snow in Penobscot, Maine, 28 in (71 cm) of snow in Albany, New Hampshire and 25.6 in (65 cm) of snow in Pawlet, New York. Portions of Interstate 93 closed due to the snow. The snowstorm resulted in 360,000 power outages in the Northeast, with nearly 200,000 in Maine alone. Further south, record rainfall brought flooding to Philadelphia, and shut down portions of the Cross Island Parkway and Fifth Avenue in New York City. The Staten Island Railway was also closed due to the rain. Following the floods, temperatures dropped below freezing, leading to icy patches on roads in the New York metropolitan area.

=== Early April blizzard ===
- Category 0 "Nuisance" (RSI/NOAA: N/A)
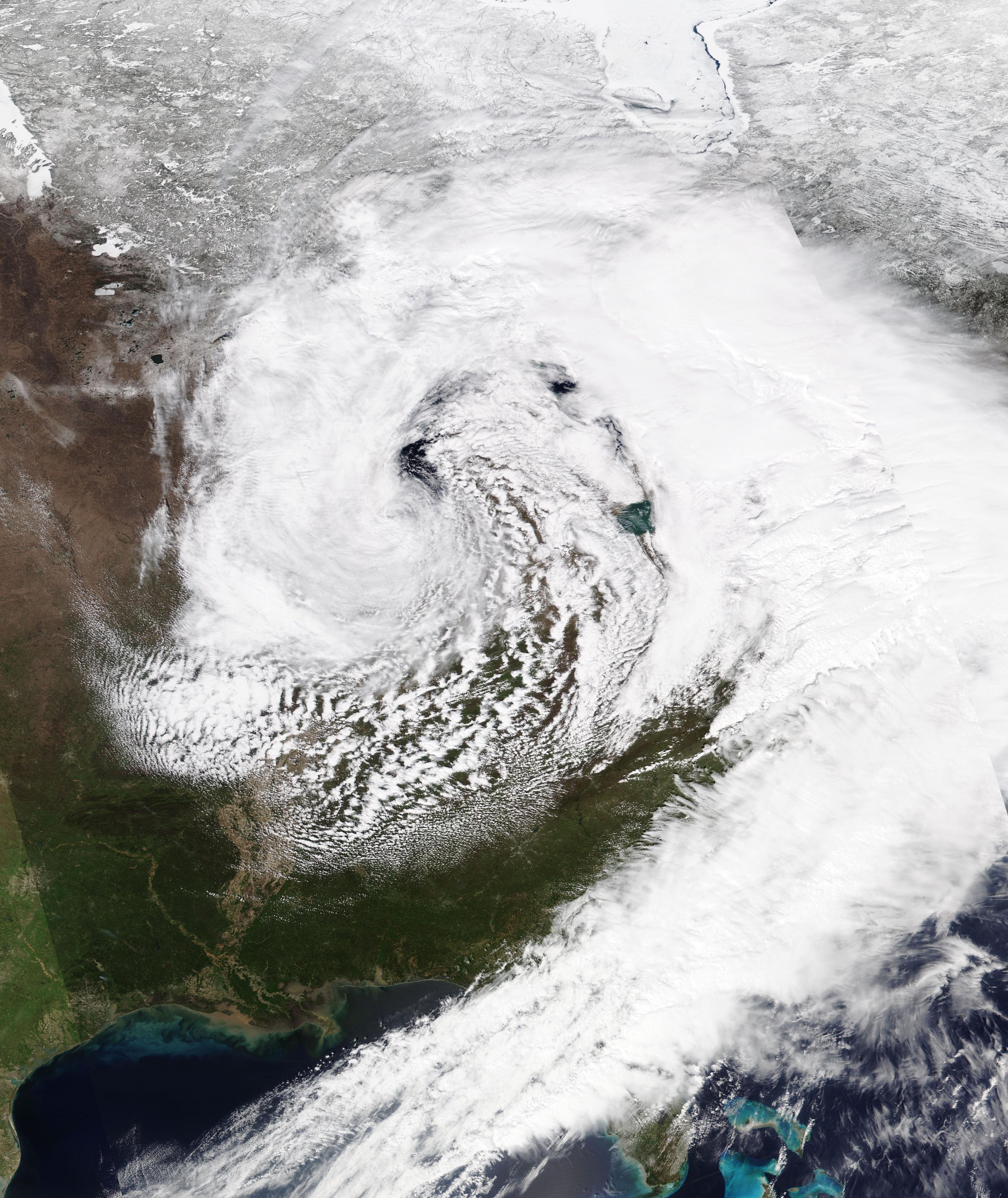
- Duration: April 2 – April 5, 2024
- Maximum snow: 28.0 in (71 cm)
- Fatalities: 4 fatalities
- Damage: $1.8 billion (2024 USD)

Early on April 2, a developing storm system began to produce heavy snow in the Upper Midwest. Blizzard warnings were issued for portions of upper Michigan and winter storm warnings were issued elsewhere across the Upper Midwest, Upstate New York and into New England. The storm reached a minimum pressure of 984 mbar while located over southern Lake Michigan. A deepening low-pressure area moving north toward New England became the dominant center of the storm as the greatest impacts shifted eastward into the Northeastern United States. Precipitation began as rain in northern New England on April 3 before transitioning to snow as cold air advection from high pressure positioned to the north of the storm. Heavy snow fell in areas of Upstate New York and New England through April 4, with scattered snow showers persisting until mid-day on April 5. The heaviest snow accumulation was recorded near Herman, Michigan at 28 inches (71 cm), with 24 inches (61 cm) near Moretown, Vermont, 21.5 inches (55 cm) near Shapleigh, Maine, and 21 inches (53 cm) near Jefferson, New Hampshire. A wind gust of 73 miles per hour (117 km/h) was recorded in Wellfleet, Massachusetts.

On April 4, wet, sticky snow adhering to trees and utility infrastructure coinciding with strong easterly winds caused widespread power outages and sporadic road closures across southeastern New Hampshire and southwest Maine. Four deaths were directly attributed to the storm. Over 500,000 customers were without power in northern New England on April 4, with 230,000 outages in New Hampshire and 275,000 in Maine.

== Records ==
=== Northern United States ===
Many regions, particularly the Upper Midwest, saw their warmest winter on record, which was coupled with below-average snowfall as well. Ice coverage across the Great Lakes was at a record low for the 2023–24 winter due to a lack of persistent cold air. The Michiana region recorded their 2nd warmest and 4th least snowy winter. While the seasonal snowfall total of 7.5 in (19 cm) in New York City was significantly higher than the previous winter, it still ranked as the 9th least snowy winter on record. At 9.8 in (25 cm) of snow, Boston had their third least snowy winter on record. However, the Quad Cities region experienced their heaviest one week snow totals, with a total of 25.5 in (65 cm) of snow falling in Moline, Illinois and 24.7 in (63 cm) falling in Dubuque, Iowa between January 9 and January 13.

=== Canada ===
Several cities experienced one of their warmest winters on record, with little snowfall occurring on Christmas Day. Extreme temperature contrasts occurred in December 2023 and January 2024, with the latter being one of the warmest Decembers on record in Canada, and coldest January in decades across Alberta and British Columbia.

=== Mexico ===
In February, temperatures in Mexico City rose to near 30 °C (86 °F), warmer than the usual temperatures for that month.

== Season effects ==
This is a table of all of the events that have occurred in the 2023–24 North American winter. It includes their duration, damage, impacted locations, and death totals. Deaths in parentheses are additional and indirect (an example of an indirect death would be a traffic accident), but were still related to that storm. All of the damage figures are in 2024 USD.

Regional snowfall index scale
C0	C1	C2	C3	C4	C5

2023–24 North American winter season statistics
Event name	Dates active	RSI category	RSI value	Highest gust mph (km/h)	Minimum pressure (mbar)	Maximum snow in (cm)	Maximum ice in (mm)	Areas affected	Damage (2023 USD)	Deaths
Pre-Thanksgiving storm complex	November 21–22	N/A	N/A	Unknown	Unknown	6 (15)	Unknown	New England	Unknown	0
Late November winter storm	November 24–28	N/A	N/A	Unknown	Unknown	42.7 (107)	Unknown	Great Plains, Midwestern United States, Great Lakes	Unknown	4
Christmas Day blizzard	December 25–27	N/A	N/A	Unknown	Unknown	14.6 (37)	1 (25.4)	Great Plains	Unknown	1
Early January nor'easter	January 6–7	N/A	N/A	Unknown	Unknown	18.5 (66)	0.5 (12.7)	Northeast United States	Unknown	0
First storm (January 8–10)	January 8–10	Category 1	2.38	102 mph (164 km/h)	Unknown	21 (53)	Unknown	Northwestern, Midwestern, and Southern United States	Unknown	2
January 10–13 blizzard	January 10–13	N/A	N/A	118 mph(190 km/h)	Unknown	49 (123)	0.95 (24.1)	Western United States, Midwest, Northeastern United States, Rockies	Unknown	5
Mid-January winter storm	January 12–18	Category 1	1.44	118 mph (190 km/h)	983 mbar	49.5 (126)	Unknown	Northwestern, Southern and Northeastern United States, Atlantic Canada	Unknown	30
Mid-January cold wave	January 15–22	N/A	N/A	Unknown	Unknown	50 (127)	2 (63.5)	Rocky Mountains, Midwest	Unknown	55
Pre-Valentine's Day nor'easter	February 10–13	N/A	N/A	40 mph (64 km/h)	956 mbar	15.2 (38)	Unknown	Mid-Atlantic United States, Southern	Unknown	1
February 2024 nor'easter	February 15–18	N/A	N/A	Unknown	Unknown	13.8 (35)	0.5 (12.7)	Mid-Atlantic United States	Unknown	0
Early April blizzard	April 2–5	N/A	N/A	73 mph (117.4 km/h)	984 mbar	28.0 (71.1)	Unknown	Upper Midwest and Northeast United States	Unknown	4
Season aggregates
2 RSI storms	November 21 – April 6				987	50 (127)	2(50.8)		≥ $	102

== See also ==
- List of major snow and ice events in the United States
- Winter storm
- 2023–24 European windstorm season
- Tornadoes of 2023
- Tornadoes of 2024
- Weather of 2023
- Weather of 2024

Preceded by 2022–23	North American winters 2023–24	Succeeded by 2024–25
