= January 2009 North American ice storm =

2009 ice storm in North America

Meteorological history
- Formed: January 25, 2009
- Dissipated: January 30, 2009

Winter storm
- Lowest pressure: 1008 mbar (hPa)
- Max. snowfall: 2.5 inches (ice); 13 inches (snow)

Overall effects
- Fatalities: 65 (35 in Kentucky)
- Damage: At least $125 million
- Areas affected: parts of Oklahoma, Arkansas, Missouri, Illinois, Indiana, Tennessee, and Kentucky
- Power outages: 1.3 million
- Part of the 2008–09 North American winter

The January 2009 North American ice storm was a major ice storm that impacted parts of Kansas, Oklahoma, Arkansas, Missouri, Illinois, Indiana, Ohio, West Virginia, Tennessee, and Kentucky. The storm produced widespread power outages for over 2 million people due to heavy ice accumulation. The hardest-hit areas were in Kentucky with over 500,000 residences without power during the height of the storm, including 100,000 without power for over one week, and northern Arkansas, with 300,000 residences without power. This ice storm killed 65 people nationwide and 35 in Kentucky. Most deaths were attributed to carbon monoxide poisoning due to power generators or kerosene heaters being used indoors without proper ventilation. Kentucky Governor Steve Beshear called up the entire Kentucky Army National Guard to deal with the after-effects of this storm, the largest National Guard call up in that state's history. Mammoth Cave National Park closed due to the storm.

Emergency response teams from NRWA state affiliates, including the Arkansas, Kentucky, Oklahoma, Missouri, and Florida rural water associations, provided portable generators and technical assistance to maintain the water supply in the impacted areas.

== Gallery ==
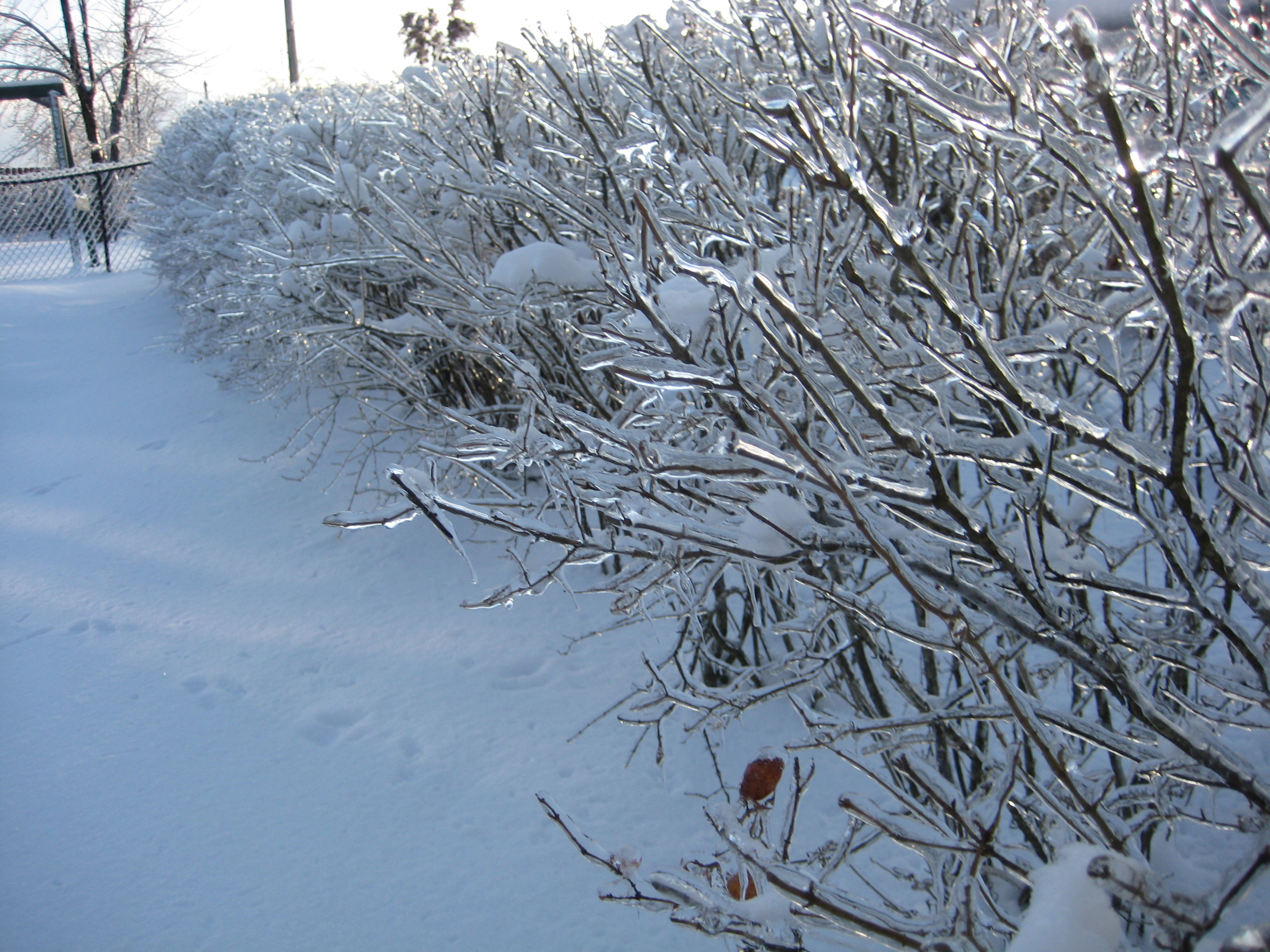
A row of bushes in Floyd County, Indiana.

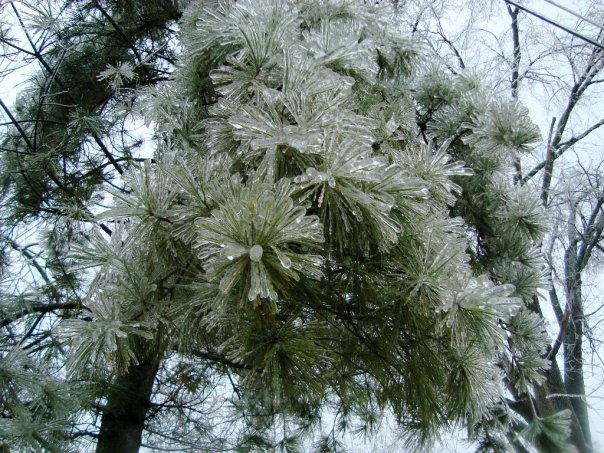
Pine needles coated in ice in Central Kentucky.

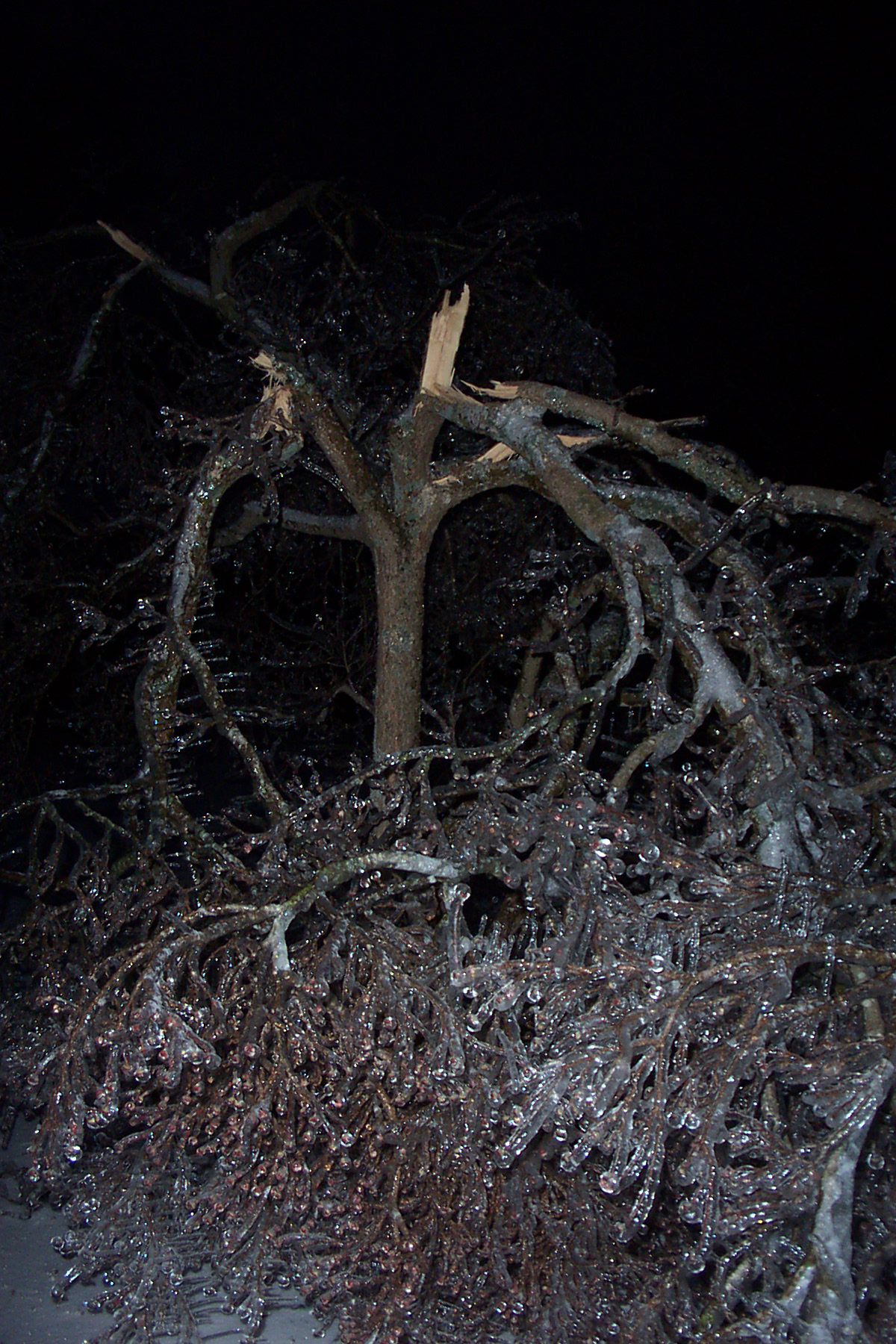
Tree split apart under the weight of ice on its branches in Siloam Springs, Arkansas.

== See also ==
- December 2008 Northeastern United States ice storm
- Global storm activity of 2009
- Freezing rain
