= 2007–08 North American winter =

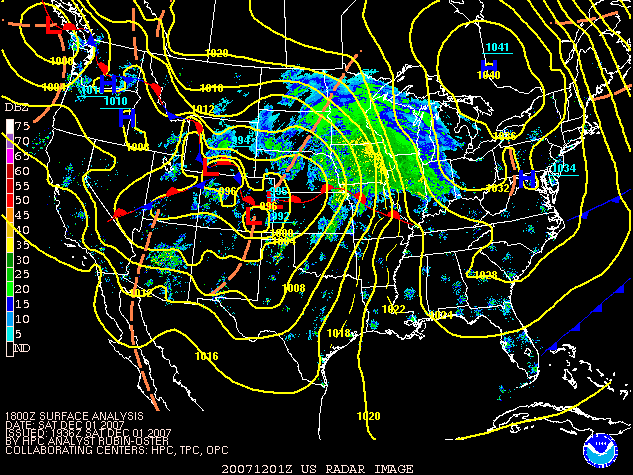
- A winter storm impacting the western United States on December 1, 2007

Seasonal boundaries
- Meteorological winter: December 1 – February 28
- Astronomical winter: December 22 – March 20
- First event started: November 29, 2007
- Last event concluded: April 13, 2008

Most notable event
- Name: February 2008 North American winter storm
  - Duration: February 5–8, 2008
  - Lowest pressure: 991 mb (29.26 inHg)
  - Fatalities: 4 fatalities
  - Damage: Unknown (2008 USD)

Seasonal statistics
- Total WPC-issued storms: 18 total
- Rated storms (RSI) (Cat. 1+): 6 total
- Major storms (RSI) (Cat. 3+): 0 total
- Total fatalities: 135 total
- Total damage: $2.08 billion (2008 USD)

Related articles
- Weather of 2007

The 2007–08 North American winter was near-average in terms of winter weather, influenced by an ongoing La Niña event. The Weather Prediction Center (WPC) tracked a total of 18 significant winter weather events during the season. A large portion of the Northern United States saw large amounts of snowfall, a theme that would be repeated somewhat the following winter. 6 events were rated on the Regional Snowfall Index (RSI), though none managed to be rated above a Category 3 "Major" ranking.

While there is no well-agreed-upon date used to indicate the start of winter in the Northern Hemisphere, there are two definitions of winter which may be used. Based on the astronomical definition, winter begins at the winter solstice, which in 2007 occurred on December 22, and ends at the March equinox, which in 2008 occurred on March 20. Based on the meteorological definition, the first day of winter is December 1 and the last day February 28. Both definitions involve a period of approximately three months, with some variability.

== Seasonal forecasts ==
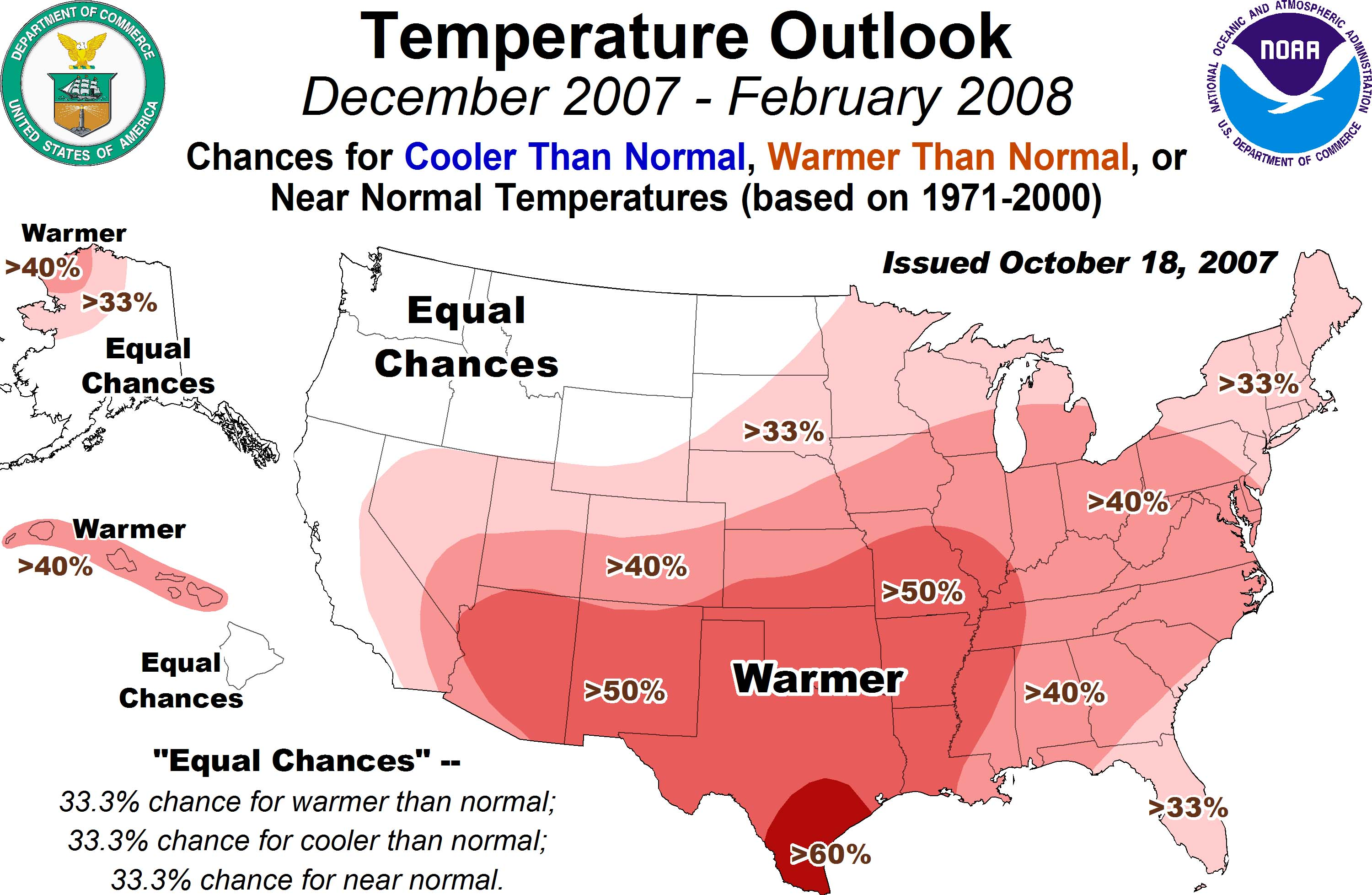
Temperature outlook

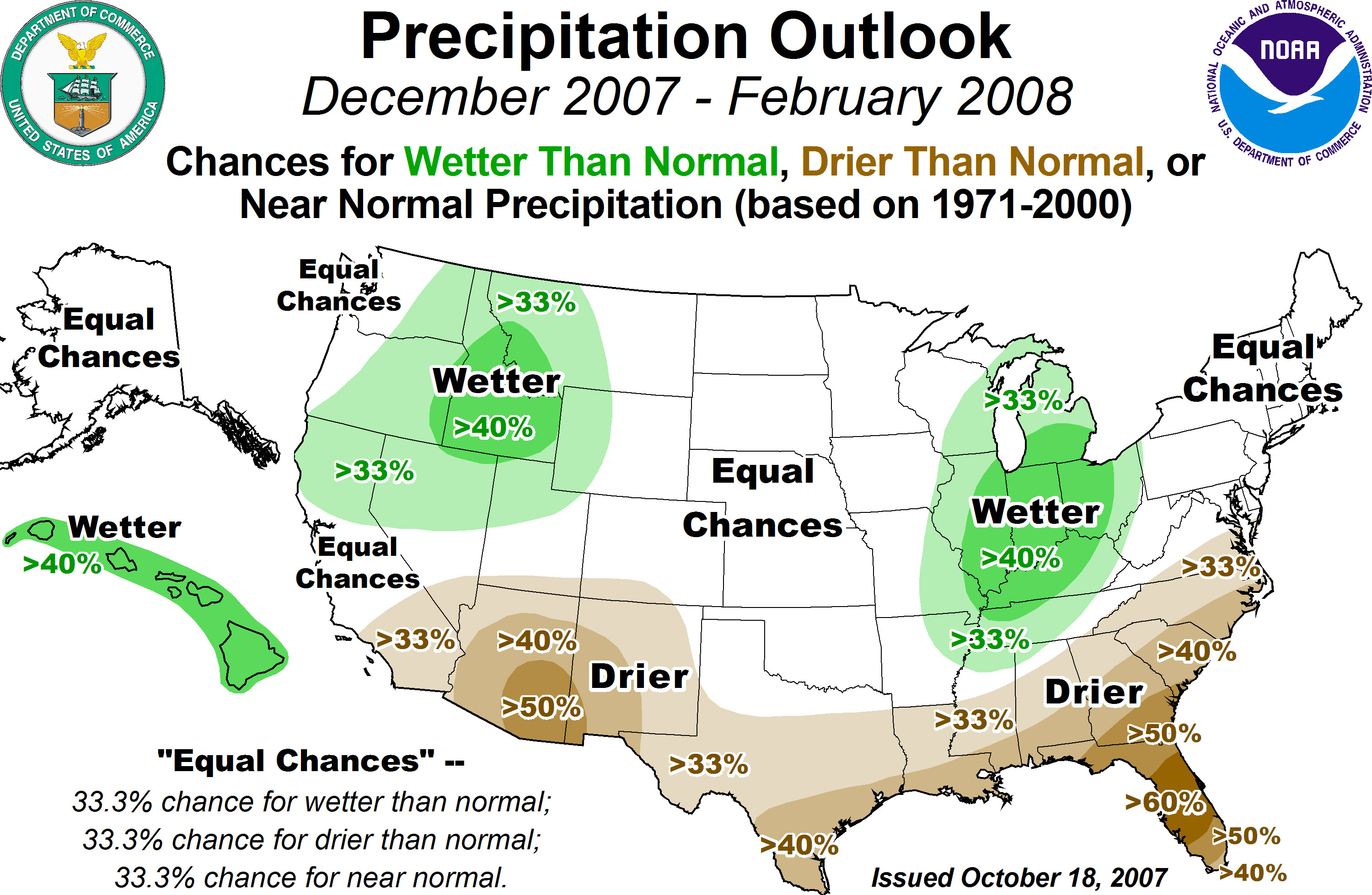
Precipitation outlook

On October 18, 2007, the National Oceanic and Atmospheric Administration's Climate Prediction Center issued its U.S. Winter Outlook. Citing the ongoing La Niña event, above-average temperatures were expected to be likely in the south-central United States. Precipitation was forecast to be below average within the southern portion of the U.S. near the Gulf Coast, while above-normal precipitation was expected in regions such as the Pacific Northwest and Ohio Valley. Equal chances for near, above- or below-average temperatures were expected to prevail across the rest of the U.S. through the winter.

== Events ==
=== Late November West Coast cyclone ===
- Category 0 "Nuisance" (RSI/NOAA: N/A)
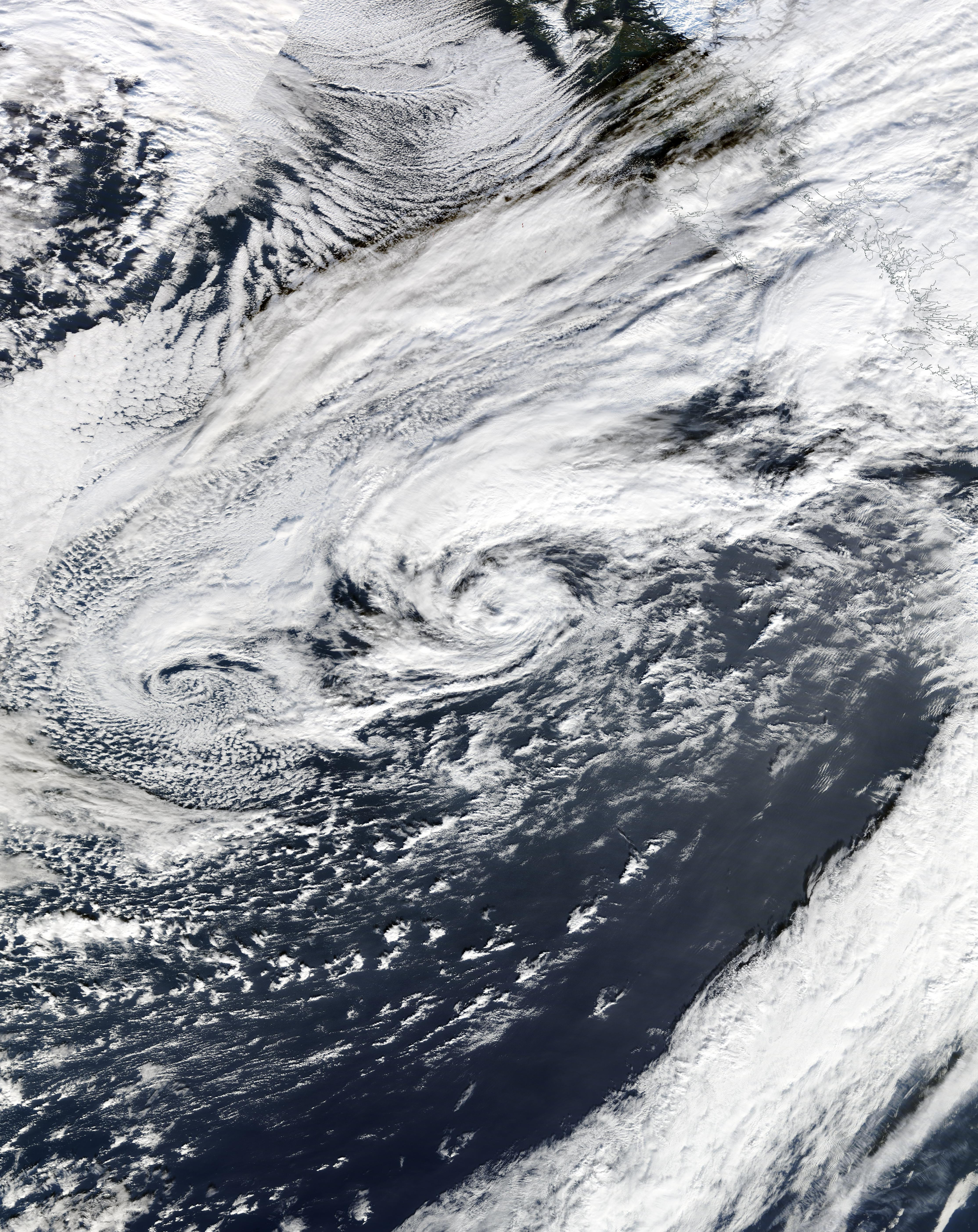
- Duration: November 29 – December 5, 2007
- Lowest pressure: 952 mb (28.11 inHg)
- Maximum snow: 6 in (15 cm)
- Fatalities: 18 fatalities
- Damage: $1.18 billion (2007 USD)

On December 1, a large storm off the Pacific Coast brought heavy snow to portions of British Columbia, including the South Coast and Vancouver Island, with amounts in higher elevations exceeding 16 inches (41 cm) and significant accumulations also for Metro Vancouver. Another large storm called a Pineapple Express brought torrential rains to the same areas on December 3 with very strong winds across portions of Oregon and Washington states, freezing rain into valley areas of central British Columbia, and heavy snow of up to 2 feet (0.61 m) across mountainous areas. The heavy rains caused a mudslide inside Stanley Park which closed its seawall which had just recently re-opened in November after it was heavily damaged during a major wind storm in December 2006. Extensive flooding was reported across many areas of Washington and Oregon after heavy rains with amounts of up to 10 inches (250 mm) were reported. Coast Guard helicopters had to evacuate and saved over 100 residents who were trapped by the high water levels. Snowmelt was also caused floods to Washington. The town of Vernonia, Oregon was completely cut off by the water and mudslides. Wind gusts locally exceeded 100 mph (160 km/h) with the highest gust registered at 129 mph (208 km/h) recorded in Bay City, Oregon. Over 100,000 customers from northern California to Washington lost electricity while 40,000 lost power in British Columbia. In addition, Amtrak service between Portland, Oregon and Vancouver, British Columbia was disrupted for at least two days.

The storm was responsible for at least 10 deaths, including five in a single vehicle crash near Prince George, British Columbia where there was snow-covered roads. Three people were killed in Washington and two in Oregon. From the perspective of Chicago, the storm was viewed as an Alberta clipper with the potential for heavy snowfall. During the evening of December 2, the storm was reported to have a central pressure of 949 mb, pressures associated with a Category 3 hurricane.

=== Early December winter storm ===
- Category 2 "Significant" (RSI/NOAA: 3.035)
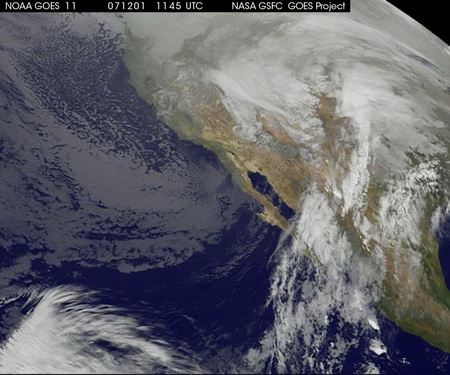
- Duration: November 29 – December 5, 2007
- Lowest pressure: 976 mb (28.82 inHg)
- Maximum snow: 44 in (110 cm)
- Fatalities: 16 fatalities

Areas of the Middle Plains and the lower Great Lakes including Des Moines, Chicago, Milwaukee, Detroit and Toronto received a significant wintry mix of precipitation before changing to rain and thunderstorms on December 1 and 2. Des Moines International Airport was shut down for several hours due to the icing conditions on runways and an American Airlines flight with 44 passengers slipped out of a taxiway while another skidded out of a runway at Madison, Wisconsin's Dane County Regional Airport. Numerous passengers were stranded for several hours at Chicago's O'Hare International Airport where 400 flights were canceled on December 1 alone. About 140,000 customers in Illinois alone lost power.

Portions of Wisconsin, Minnesota and northern Ontario received several inches of snow while the mountain regions of Colorado received as much as four feet of snow (120 cm), resulting in the postponement of the men's Super-G alpine skiing event in Beaver Creek, Colorado, where 15 inches (38 cm) was reported.

The storm was responsible for at least 16 deaths including three in Quebec, one in New York, one in Maine, one in Indiana, three in Wisconsin, two in Illinois, three in Michigan, one in Utah, and one in Colorado.

=== Mid-December winter storms ===
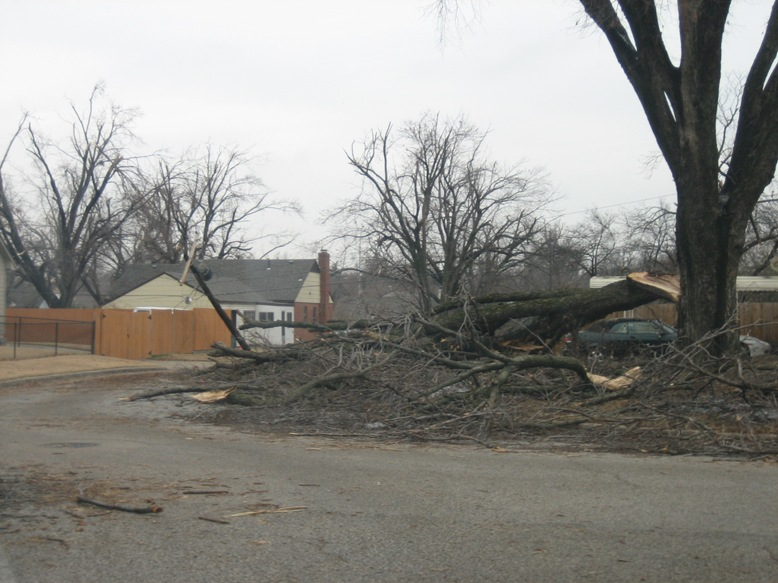
Extensive tree damage was common across most of Oklahoma, including the Tulsa region during the December 9–10 ice storm (Courtesy of NWS Tulsa, Oklahoma)

A series of winter storms impacted widespread areas of North America over a nine-day period. From December 8 to December 11, another major ice storm impacted the midsection of the United States from Texas, northeast through the Midwest, through the Mid-Atlantic States, and into southern New England. At least 38 people were killed by the ice storms, including 23 in Oklahoma, four in Kansas, three in Missouri, and one in Nebraska. Most of the fatalities were the result of traffic accidents caused by the icy weather, including four people in a single accident on Interstate 40 west of Okemah, Oklahoma. The storm caused the largest power outage in Oklahoma history, where 600,000 homes and businesses lost power, while 350,000 customers were also without power in other states, including 100,000 in both Missouri and Kansas, and scattered power outages in Nebraska, Iowa, and Illinois. Overall, over 1.5 million customers lost power throughout the Central United States with some being without electricity for over one week. The storms caused widespread school and flight cancellations with Chicago O'Hare International Airport cancelling at least 560 flights, while Tulsa International Airport was forced to halt flights on the 10th after losing power for 10 hours.

The energy of the second ice storm produced significant snows over the northeastern part of the US and the Golden Horseshoe region of Ontario on December 13 and dumped as much as 12 inches (30 cm) of snow in parts of New England and New York state.

=== Post-New Year's Day storm complex ===
- Category 0 "Nuisance" (RSI/NOAA: N/A)
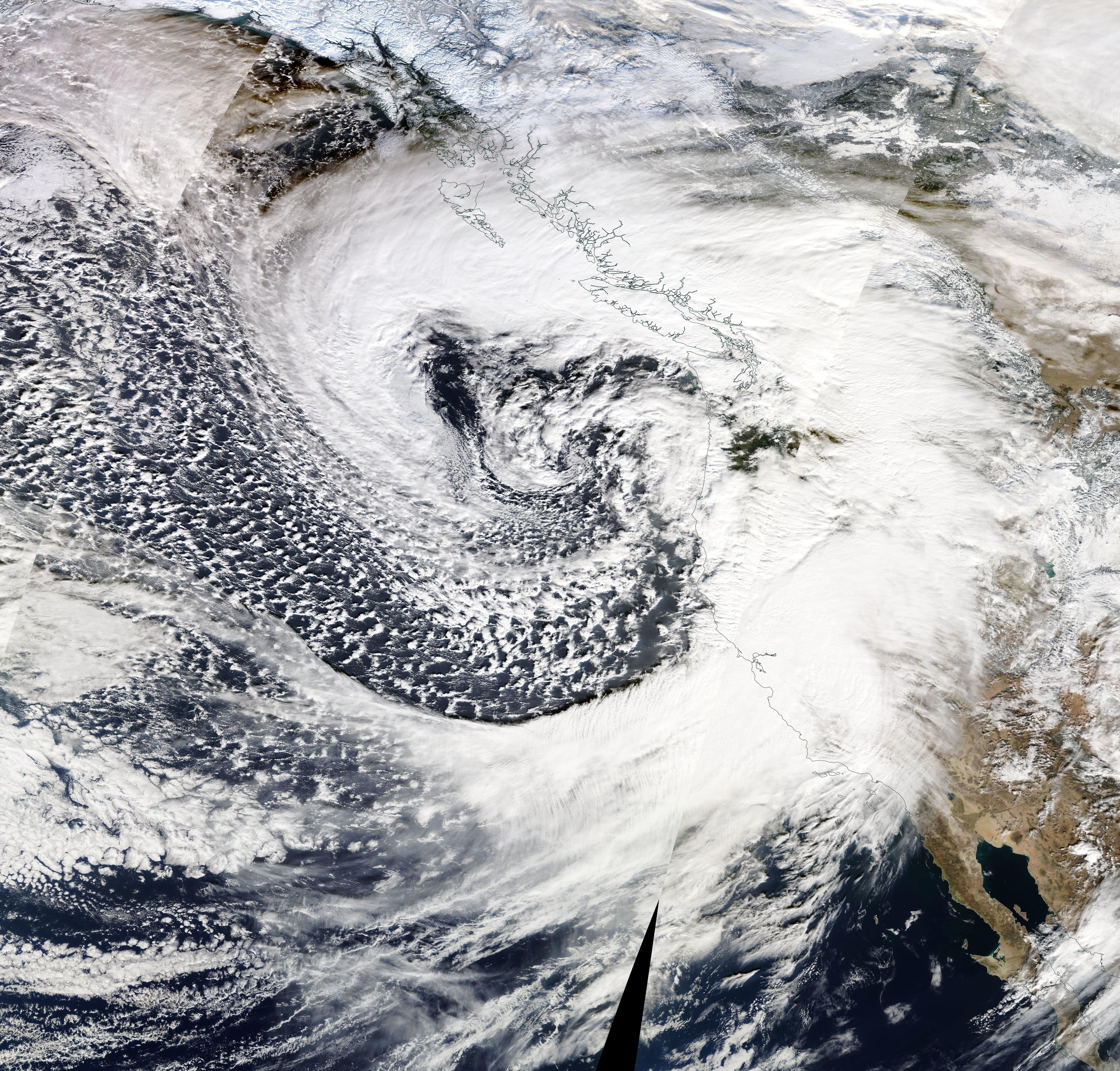
- Duration: January 2 – January 7, 2008
- Lowest pressure: 956 mb (28.23 inHg)
- Maximum snow: 132 in (340 cm)
- Fatalities: 16 fatalities
- Damage: $129 million (2008 USD)

Flights departing from San Francisco were grounded, while over 100 miles (160 km) of Interstate 80 was shut down in eastern California and western Nevada due to poor visibility and a 17-vehicle pile-up. Bay Area Rapid Transit was also disrupted with significant delays to service and was even interrupted between San Francisco and Daly City briefly due to fallen trees on the network's tracks.

Strong winds knocked power lines down causing power outages for 1.2 million Californians, while several outages were reported in Washington and Oregon. About 500 miles (800 km) of California power lines were damaged by the storm.

=== Early February storm complex ===
- Category 2 "Significant" (RSI/NOAA: 4.55)
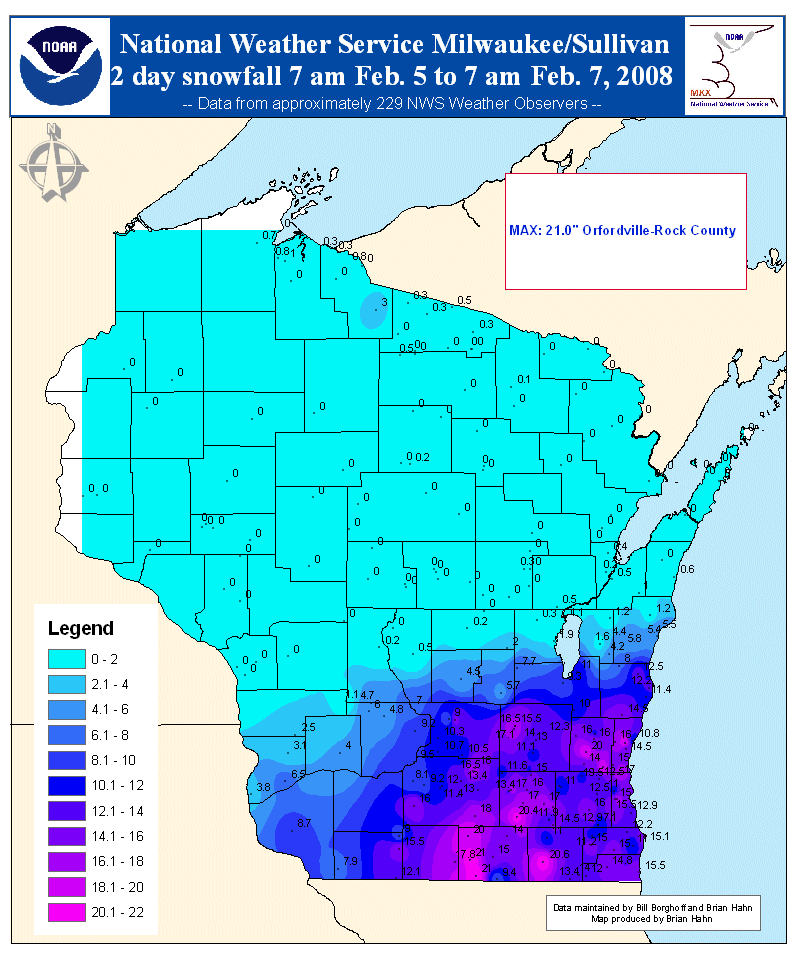
- Duration: February 5 – February 8, 2008
- Lowest pressure: 991 mb (29.26 inHg)
- Maximum snow: 16 in (41 cm)
- Fatalities: 4 fatalities

The same low pressure systems that caused the tornado outbreak also spawned a significant snowstorm from the Central Plains to the western Great Lakes where winter storm warnings were issued. Between 10 and 15 inches (25 and 38 centimetres) of snow fell from eastern Iowa to southern Wisconsin and Northern Illinois, with local amounts ranging from 18 to 21 inches (46 to 53 centimetres) in southeastern Wisconsin. In Michigan, up to 14 inches (36 cm) of snow fell north of Grand Rapids. Environment Canada also issued freezing rain and winter storm warnings for Southern Ontario, where some areas north of Lake Erie received close to 1 inch (25 mm) of freezing rain.

=== Early March blizzard ===
- Category 0 "Nuisance" (RSI/NOAA: N/A)
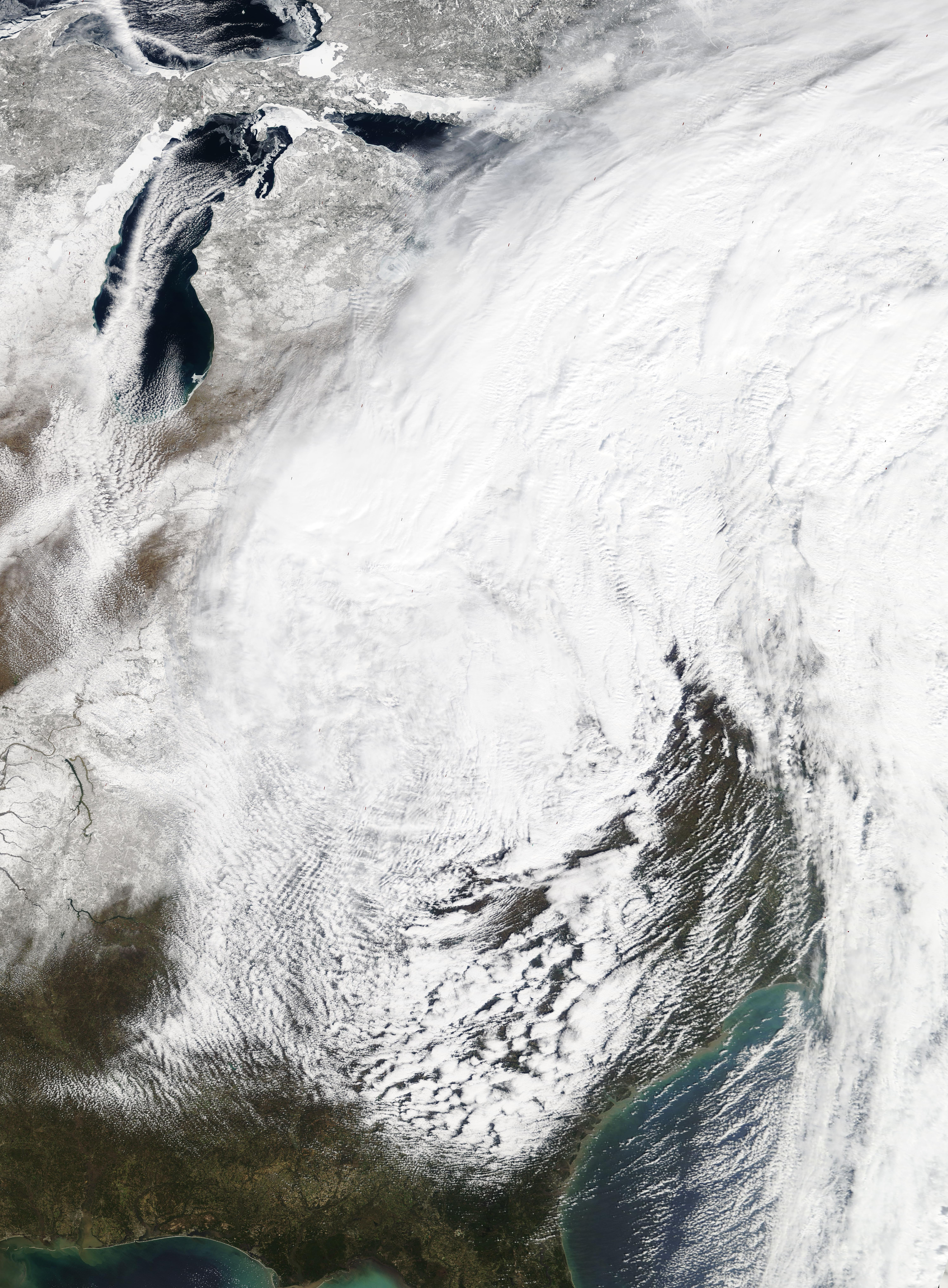
- Duration: March 5 – March 10, 2008
- Lowest pressure: 984 mb (29.06 inHg)
- Maximum snow: 28.5 in (72 cm)
- Fatalities: 17 fatalities
- Damage: $789 million (2008 USD)

A significant blizzard struck most of southern and eastern North America from March 6 to March 10, 2008. It was most notable for a major winter storm event from Arkansas to Quebec. It also produced severe weather across the east coast of the United States with heavy rain, damaging winds and tornadoes, causing locally significant damage. The hardest hit areas by the wintry weather were from the Ohio Valley to southern Quebec where up to a half a meter of snow fell locally including the major cities of Columbus, Ohio, Cleveland, Ohio, and Ottawa, Ontario. For many areas across portions of the central United States, Ontario and Quebec, it was the worst winter storm in the past several years. The blizzard and its aftermath caused at least 17 deaths across four US states and three Canadian provinces, while hundreds others were injured mostly in weather-related accidents and tornadoes.

== See also ==
- Weather of 2008

Preceded by 2006	North American winters 2007–08	Succeeded by 2008–09
