= December 2008 Northeastern United States ice storm =

American natural disaster

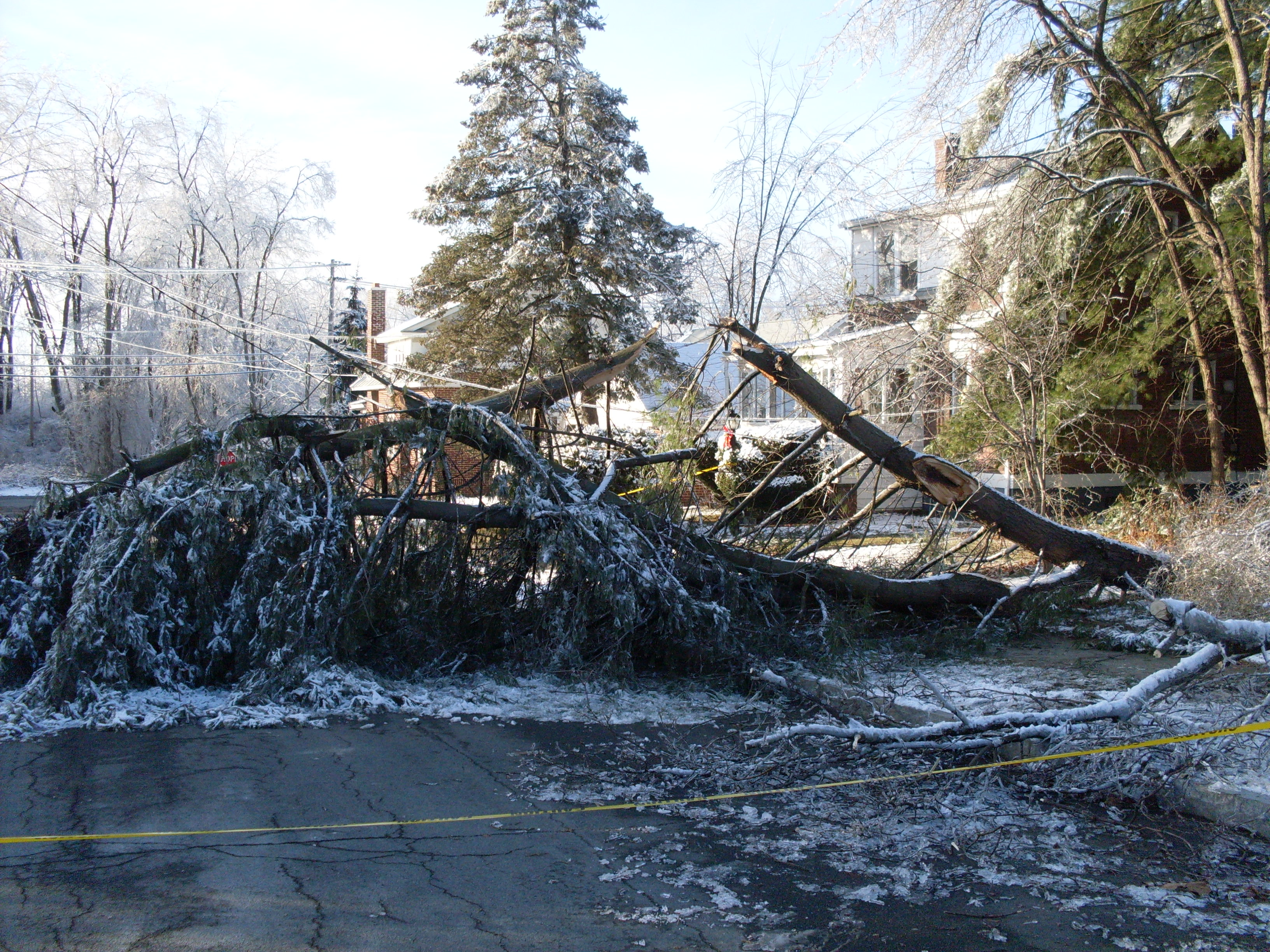
- A tree that fell due to the weight of ice in Troy, New York.

Meteorological history
- Formed: December 11, 2008
- Dissipated: December 12, 2008

Overall effects
- Fatalities: 5
- Damage: ~$2.5 to 3.7 billion (2008 USD)
- Areas affected: Northeastern United States
- Power outages: 1.7 million
- Part of the 2008–09 North American winter

The December 2008 Northeastern United States ice storm was a damaging ice storm that took out power for millions of people in the Northeastern United States. The storm was deemed the worst ice storm in a decade for New England and the most severe ice storm in 21 years for Upstate New York. Damage was primarily a result of fallen trees and fallen utility wires and poles, which were coated in a heavy layer of ice. The storm raised heavy controversy over the slow return of power, as at the storm's peak, as many as 1.7 million customers were without power. Days after the storm more than 800,000 customers were still without power. Almost a week after the storm still more than 100,000 customers were without power, affecting the holiday shopping season and crippling the business and transportation of many northeast cities for days.

== Response ==
The storm resulted in a state of emergency being declared by Governor David Paterson in sixteen counties in New York. Up to 300,000 utility customers lost service in New York's Capital District. By Sunday evening, 14 December, 126,000 were still estimated to be without power.

Fire departments in Albany and Rensselaer County ran non-stop all weekend answering calls ranging from fires to wires down. It is estimated that both counties received tens of thousands of calls by the Saturday after the storm.

In Massachusetts up to one million residents and businesses lost power due to the storm, causing Governor Deval Patrick to declare a state of emergency and mobilize at least 500 National Guardsmen to help the clean-up efforts.

Governors John Lynch of New Hampshire and John Baldacci of Maine also declared a state of emergency, and as of 13 December at least 400,000 customers were without power in New Hampshire, and at least 172,000 were without power in Maine. This total in New Hampshire was more than five times larger than those who lost power in the ice storm of 1998, previously the most devastating storm on record.

It was also reported that over 30,000 customers were left without power in Vermont, and up to 3,700 customers were left without power in Connecticut.

The American Red Cross of Northeastern New York opened multiple shelters around the Capital District to give residents a warm place to stay and eat.

== Fatalities ==
At least four deaths were attributed to the storm. Three of them were due to carbon monoxide poisoning, the source of which were gas-powered generators that were used indoors. One carbon-monoxide-related death was in New Hampshire, and the other two were in New York. The fourth fatality occurred in Massachusetts. A public works employee was found in a reservoir after having gone missing when investigating damage to trees.

== Aftermath ==
Hotels, hardware stores, malls, and restaurants that either had power or a generator saw a boom in business during the entire weekend as many residents went out to finish up holiday shopping, eat, and stay warm. Most schools closed on Friday 12 December, and some colleges ended the semester early due to the severity of the storm.

Fourteen days after the storm hit, several thousand homes throughout New Hampshire were still without power, which in some cases resulted in threats being made against workers of Public Service Company of New Hampshire (a subsidiary of Northeast Utilities), the principal electricity supplier of New Hampshire.

Similarly, there were many people in Massachusetts without power for up to two weeks, raising many questions about the slow response of some utility companies.

Several weeks after the New England storm, a similar ice storm struck the Midwestern United States, knocking out power to a million people and leading to at least 38 deaths.

== Media and coverage ==
The storm and its aftermath were covered extensively by local newspapers such as The Keene Sentinel and the Monadnock Ledger-Transcript in New Hampshire. Books detailing the storm's toll include The Weight of the Ice by David Eisenstadter, Black Ice compiled from various New Hampshire authors, and Ice by the staff of The Keene Sentinel.

== Gallery ==
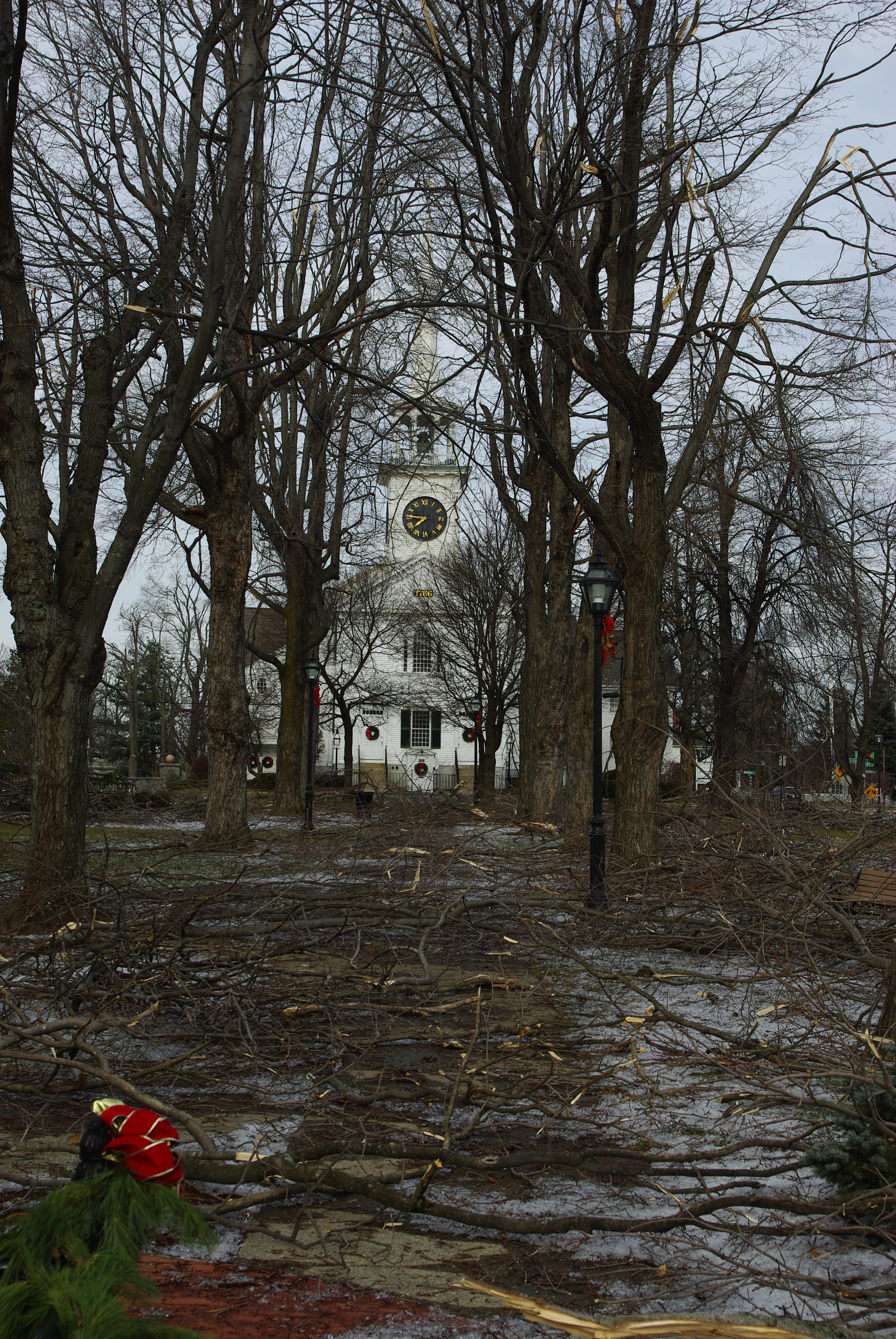
Shrewsbury, Massachusetts town square after the storm

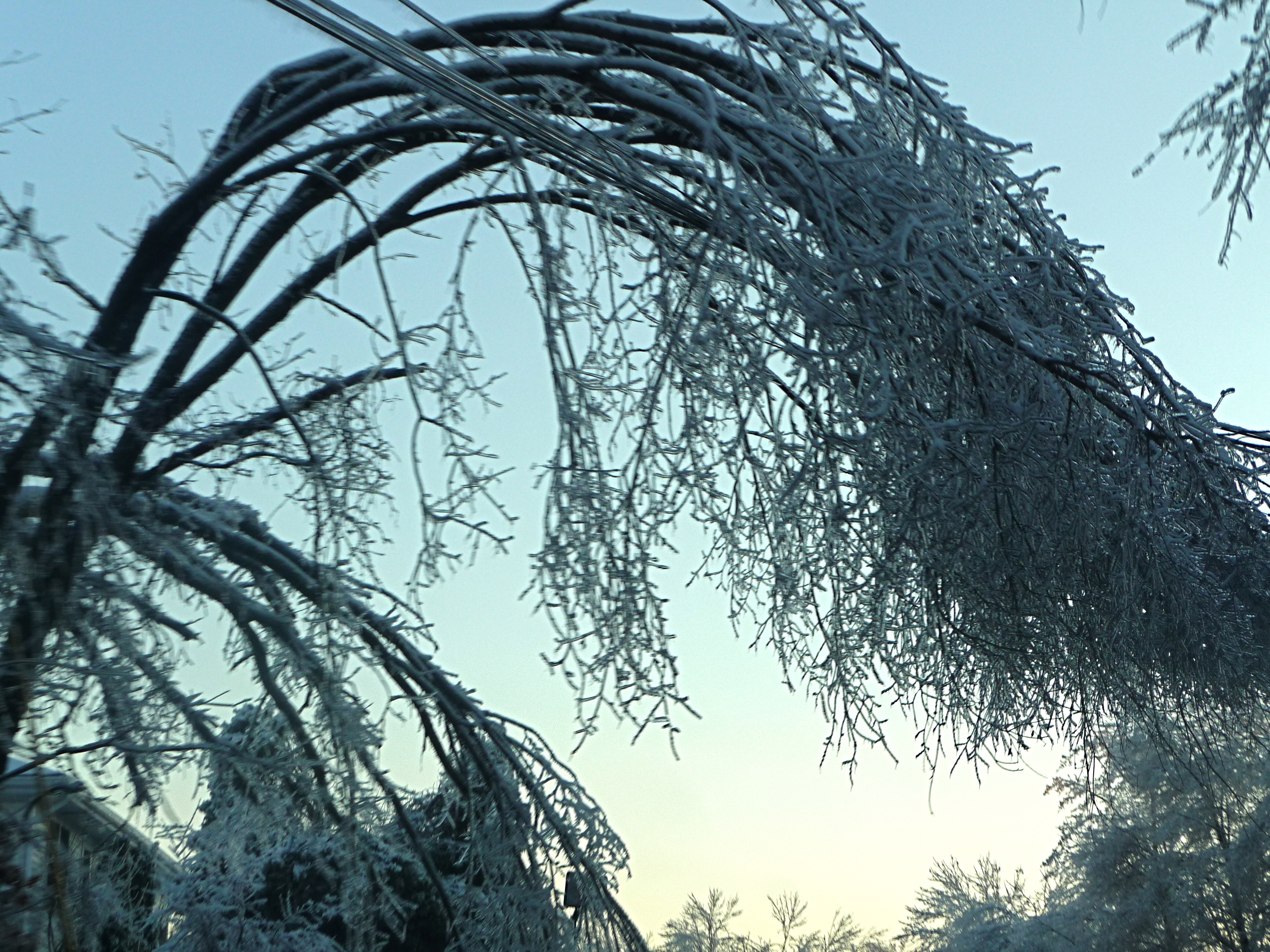
Power lines support ice-covered branches in Brunswick, New York

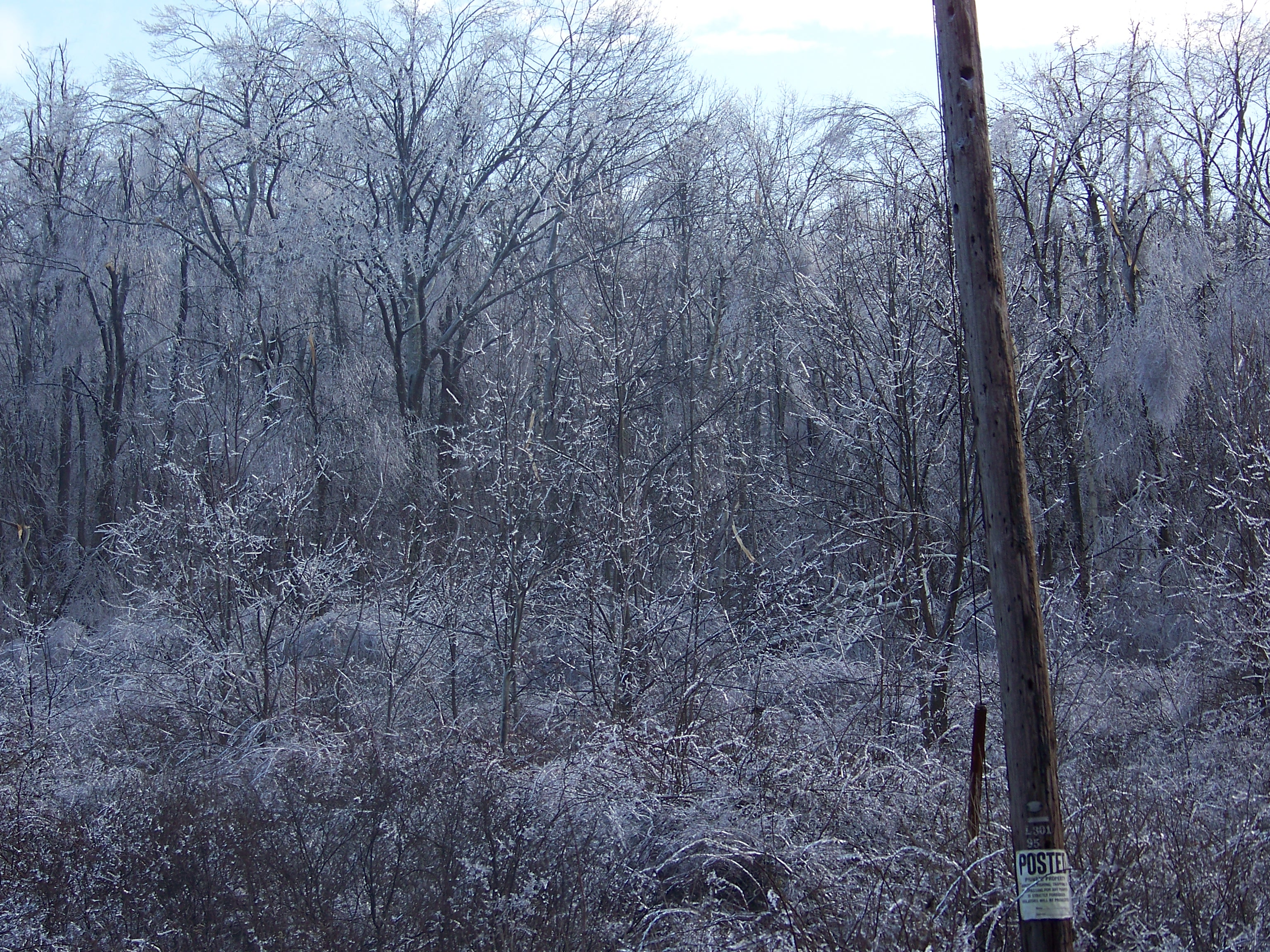
Landscape coated in ice in Dutchess County, New York

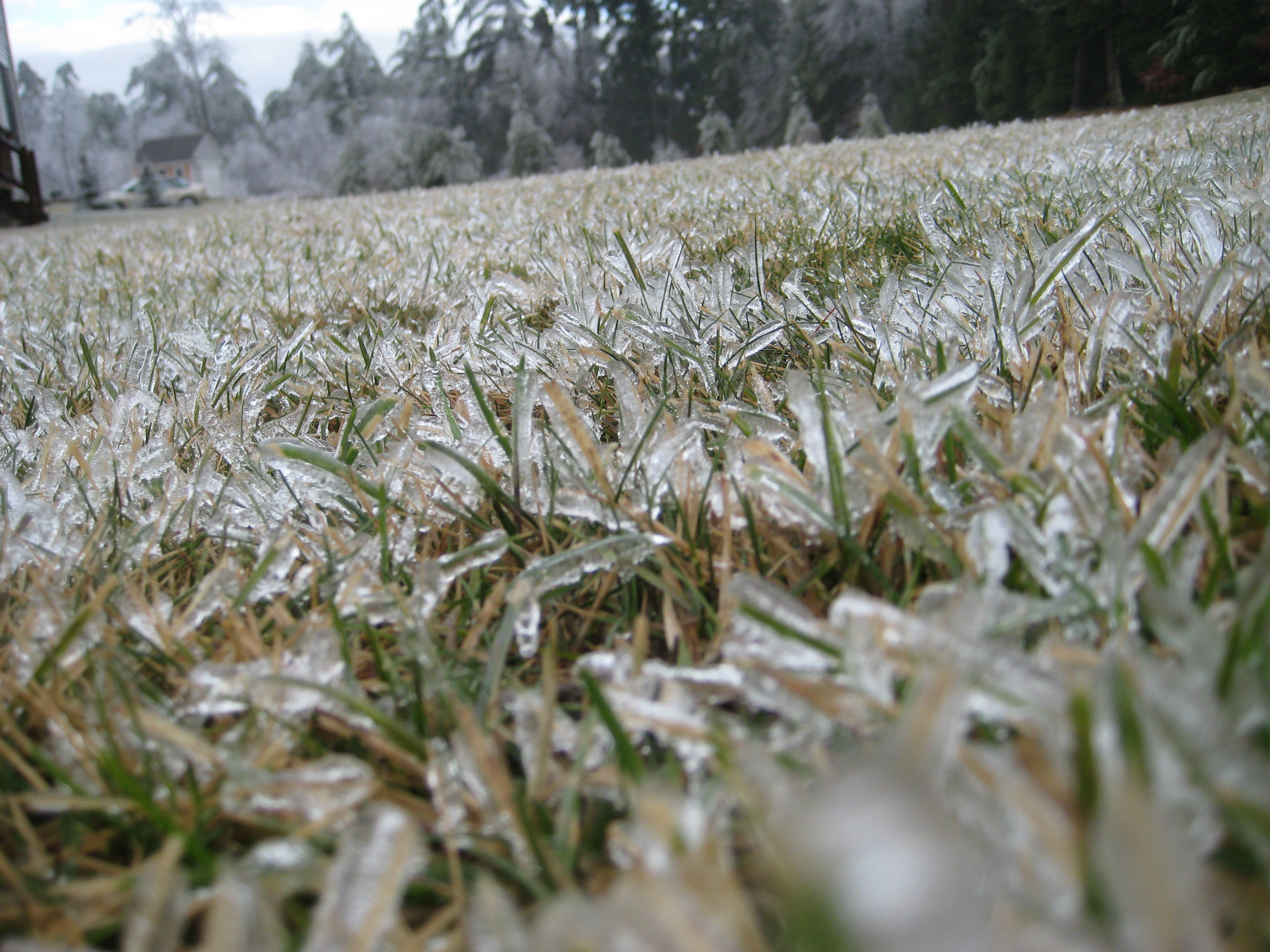
Frozen blades of grass in Hillsborough County, New Hampshire

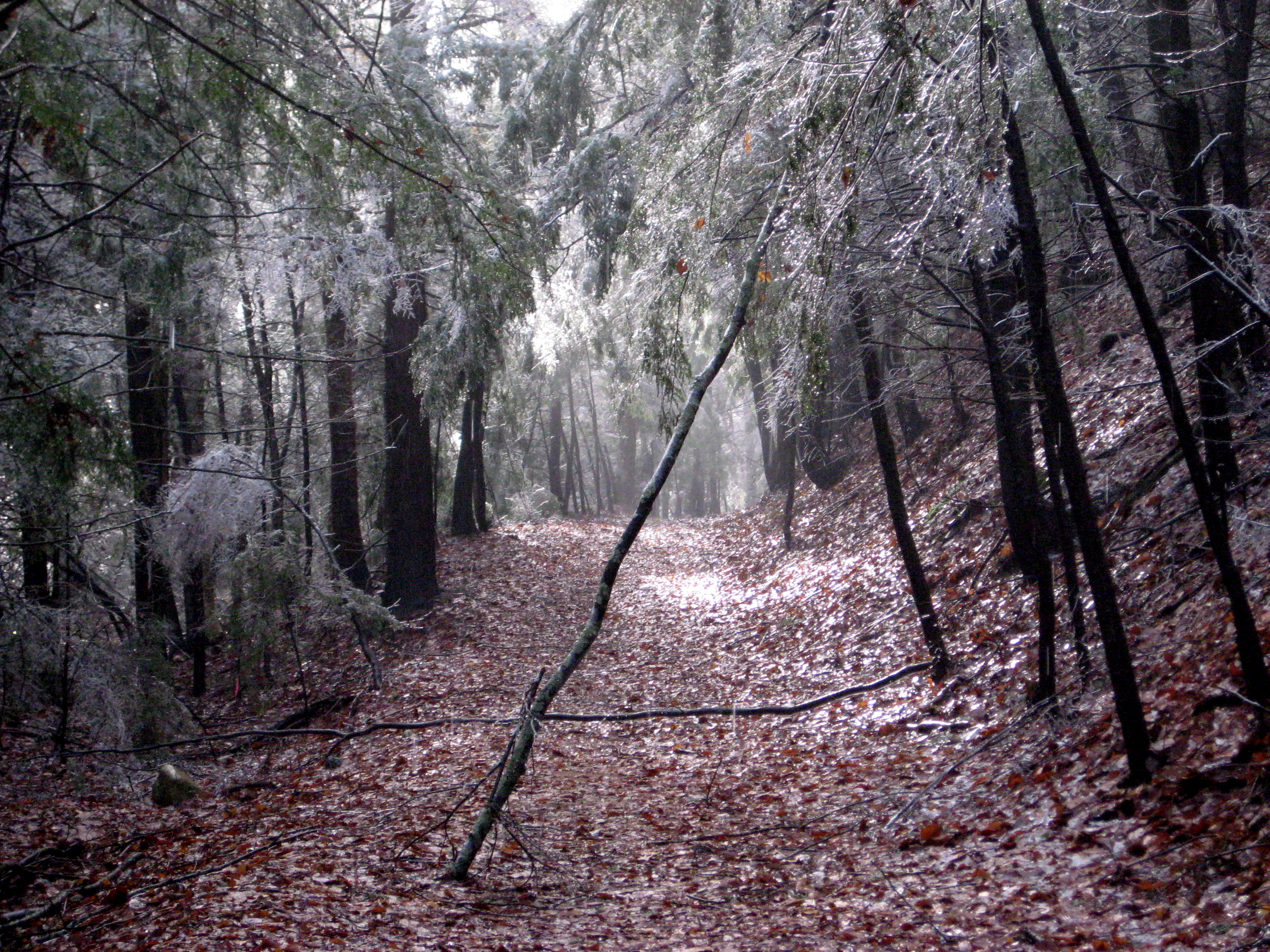
A broken tree branch, suspended from luckier trees, hanging over a snowmobile path in a forest in Hillsborough County, New Hampshire

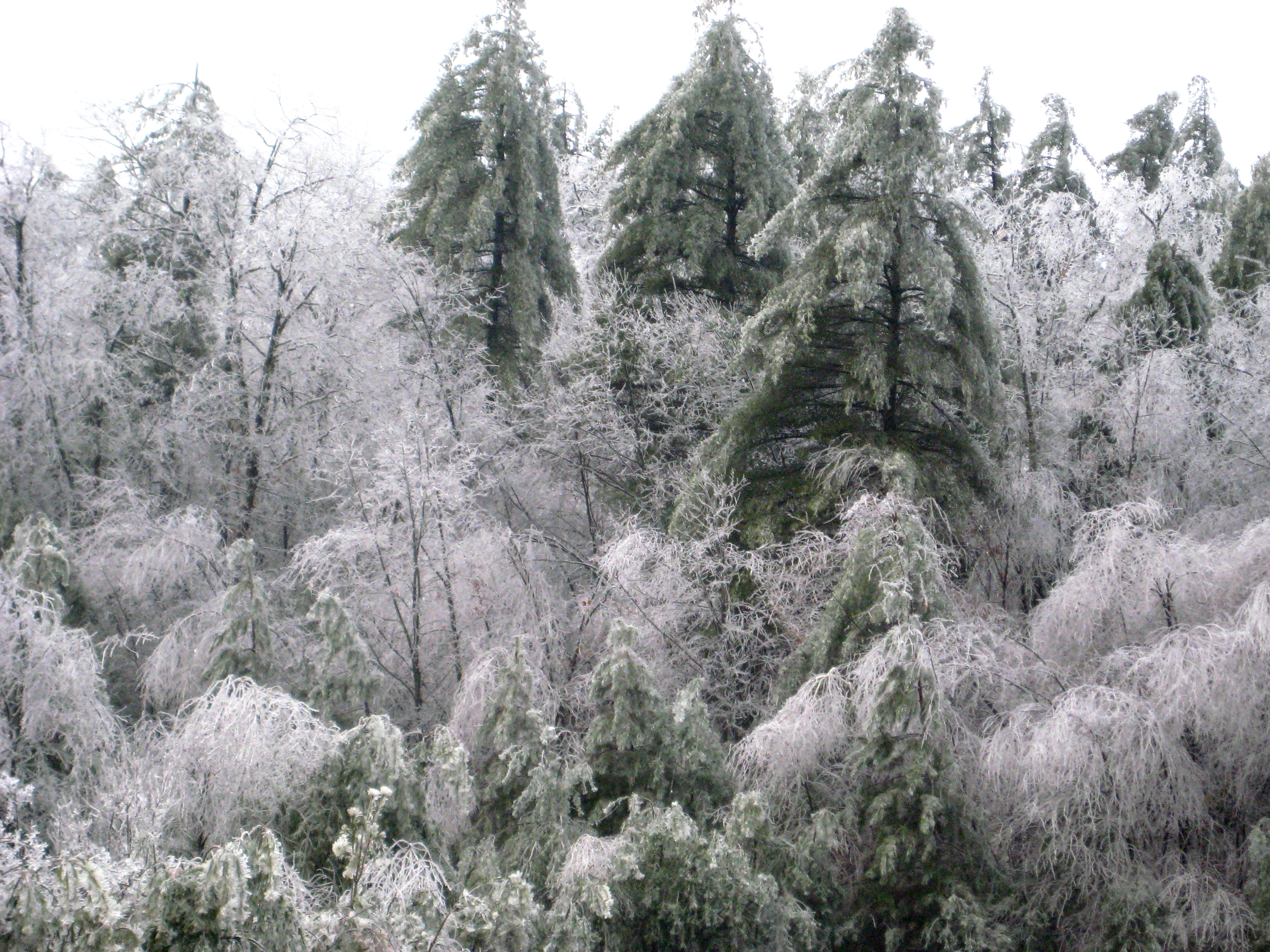
A frozen forest in Hillsborough County, New Hampshire

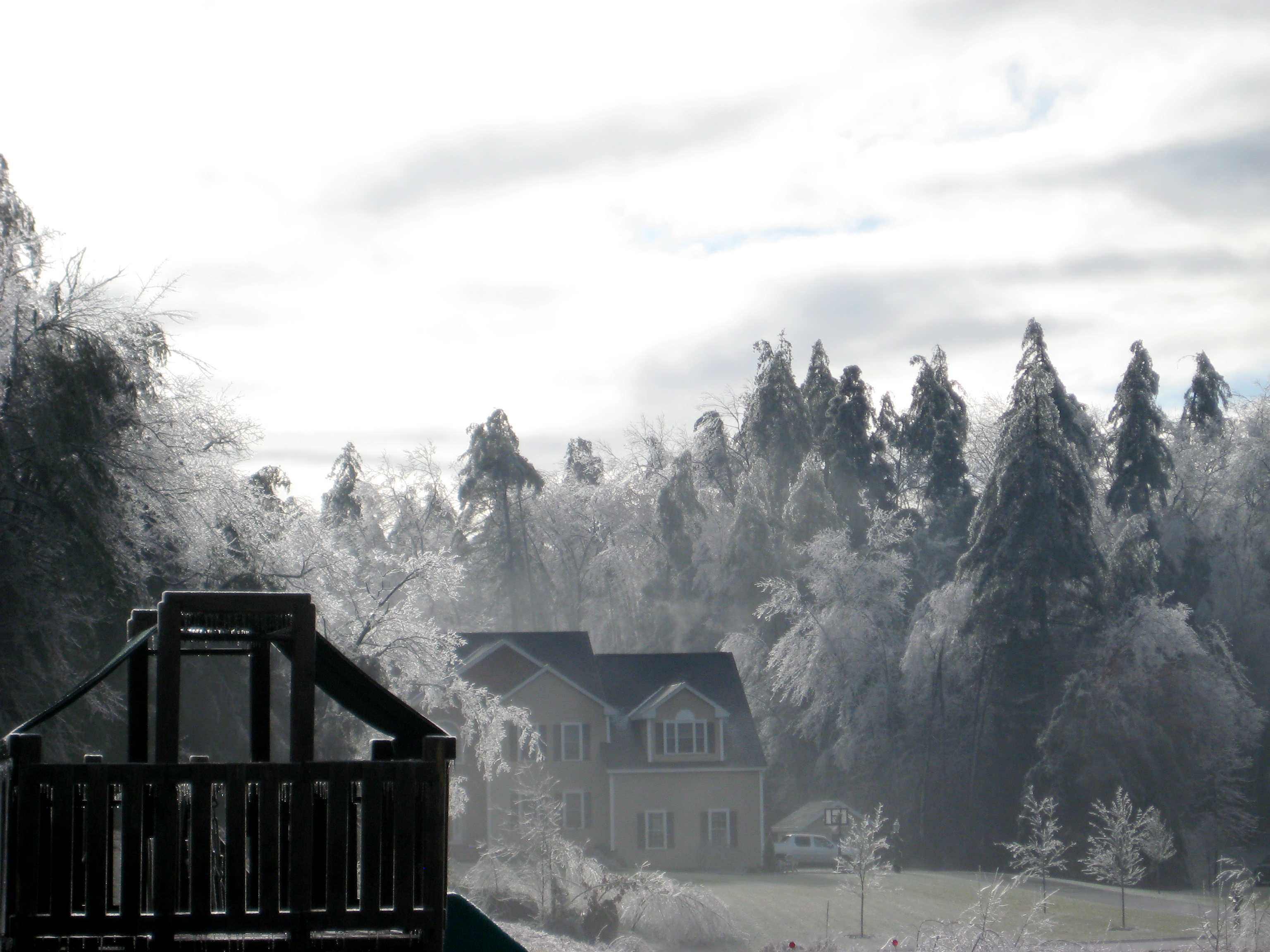
A frozen forest behind a swingset in Hillsborough County, New Hampshire

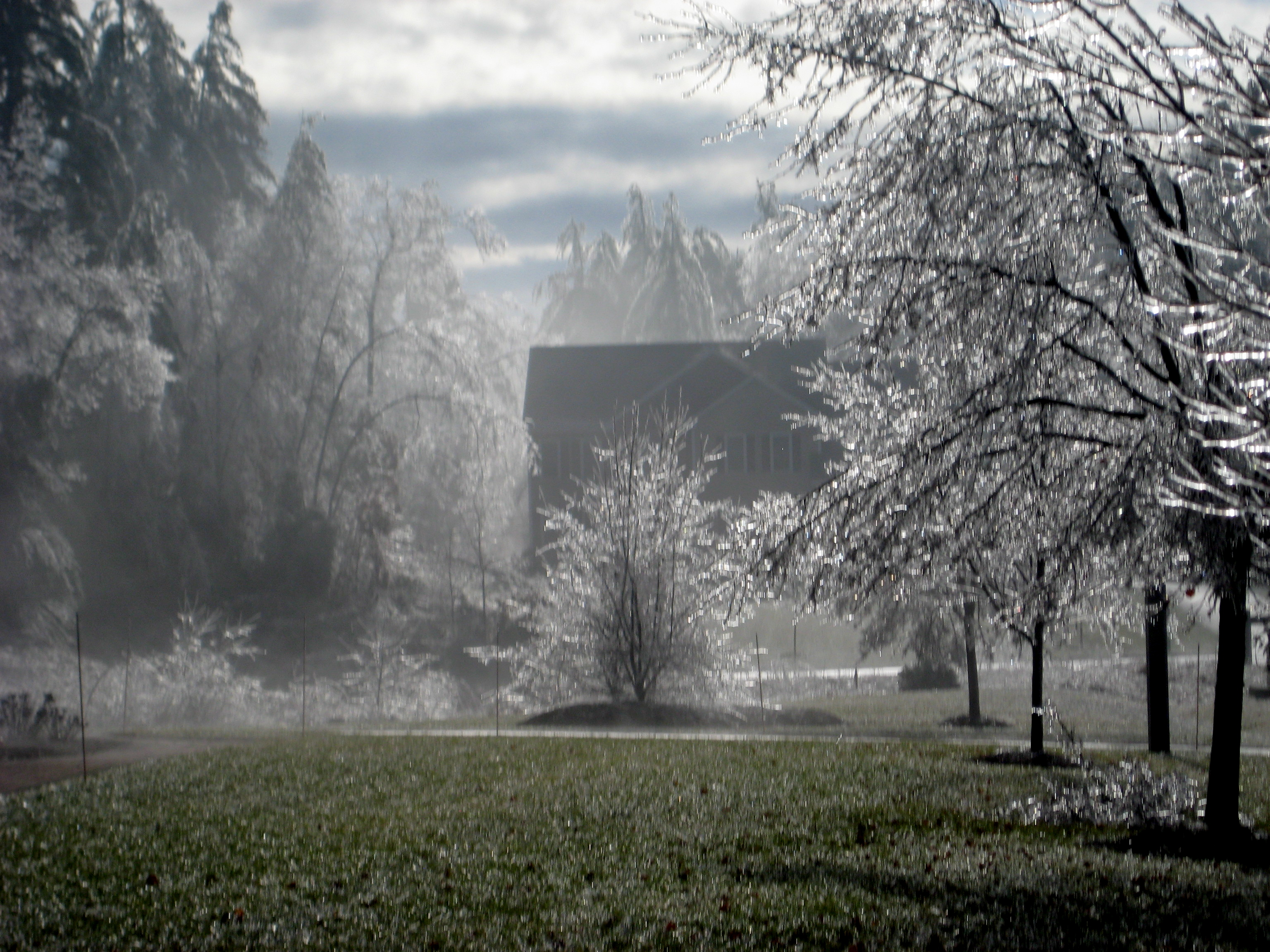
A frozen lawn and trees with houses in background, Hillsborough County, New Hampshire

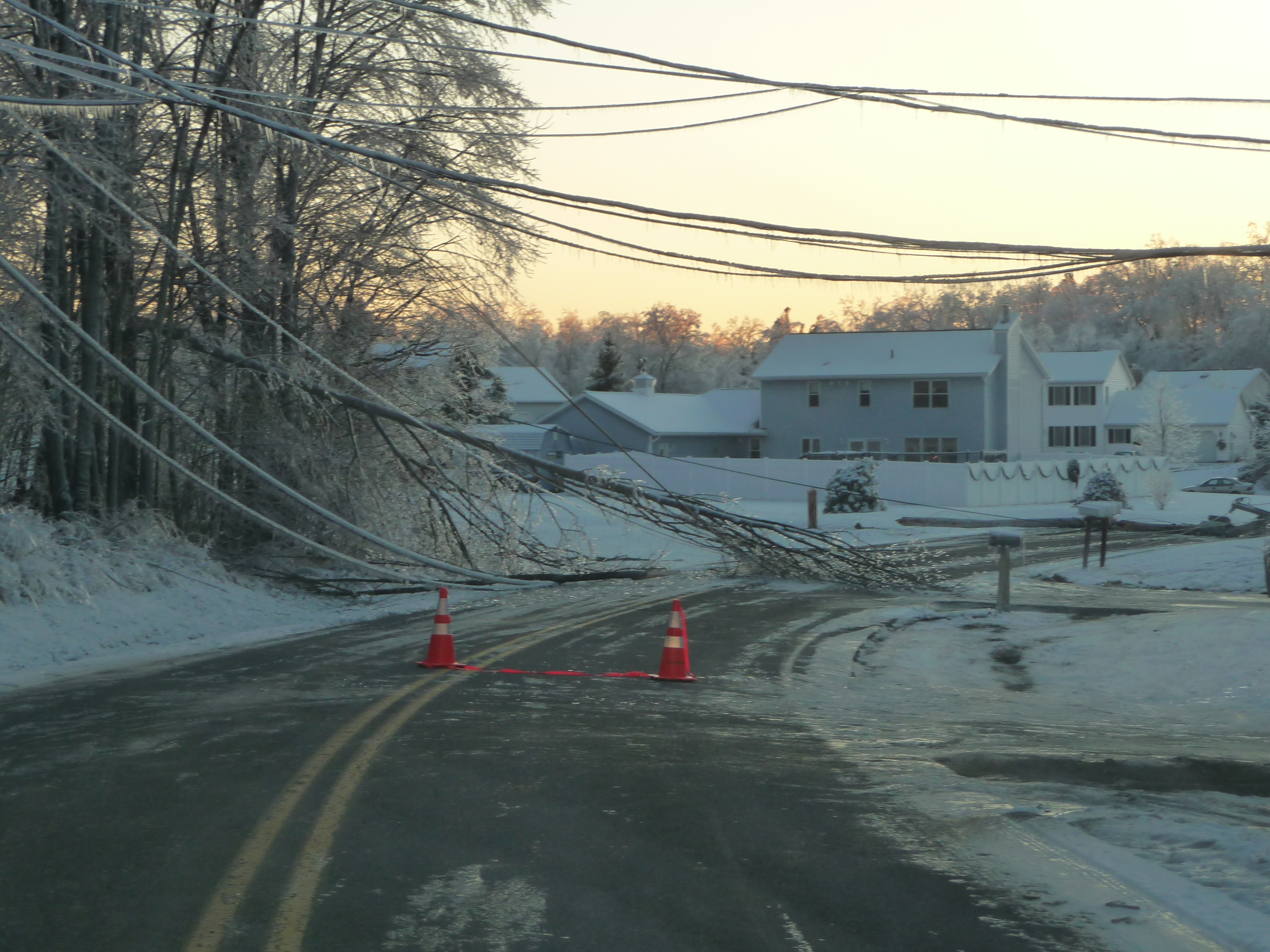
Damage in North Greenbush, New York after the storm

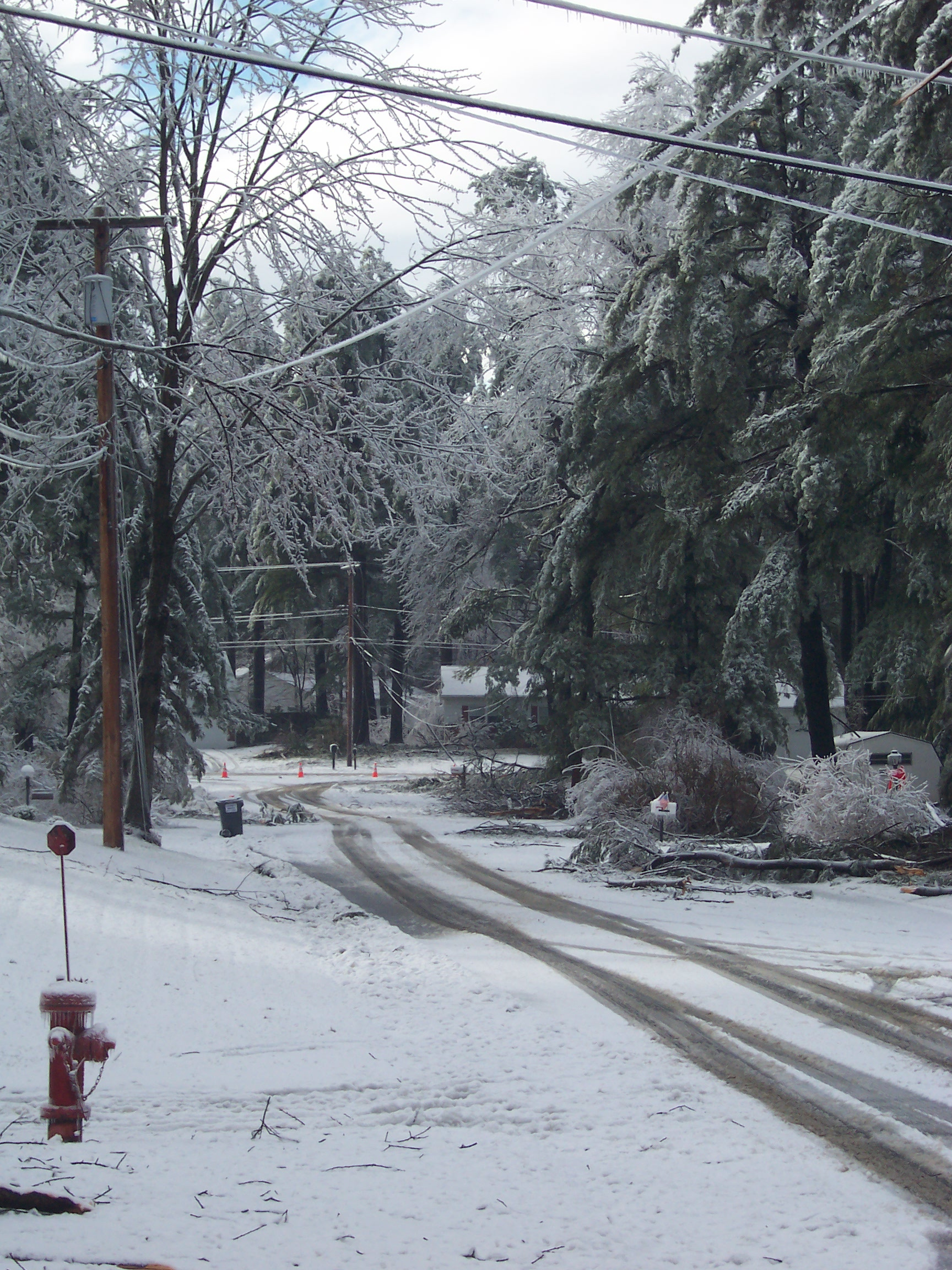
Damage in Clifton Park, New York after the storm

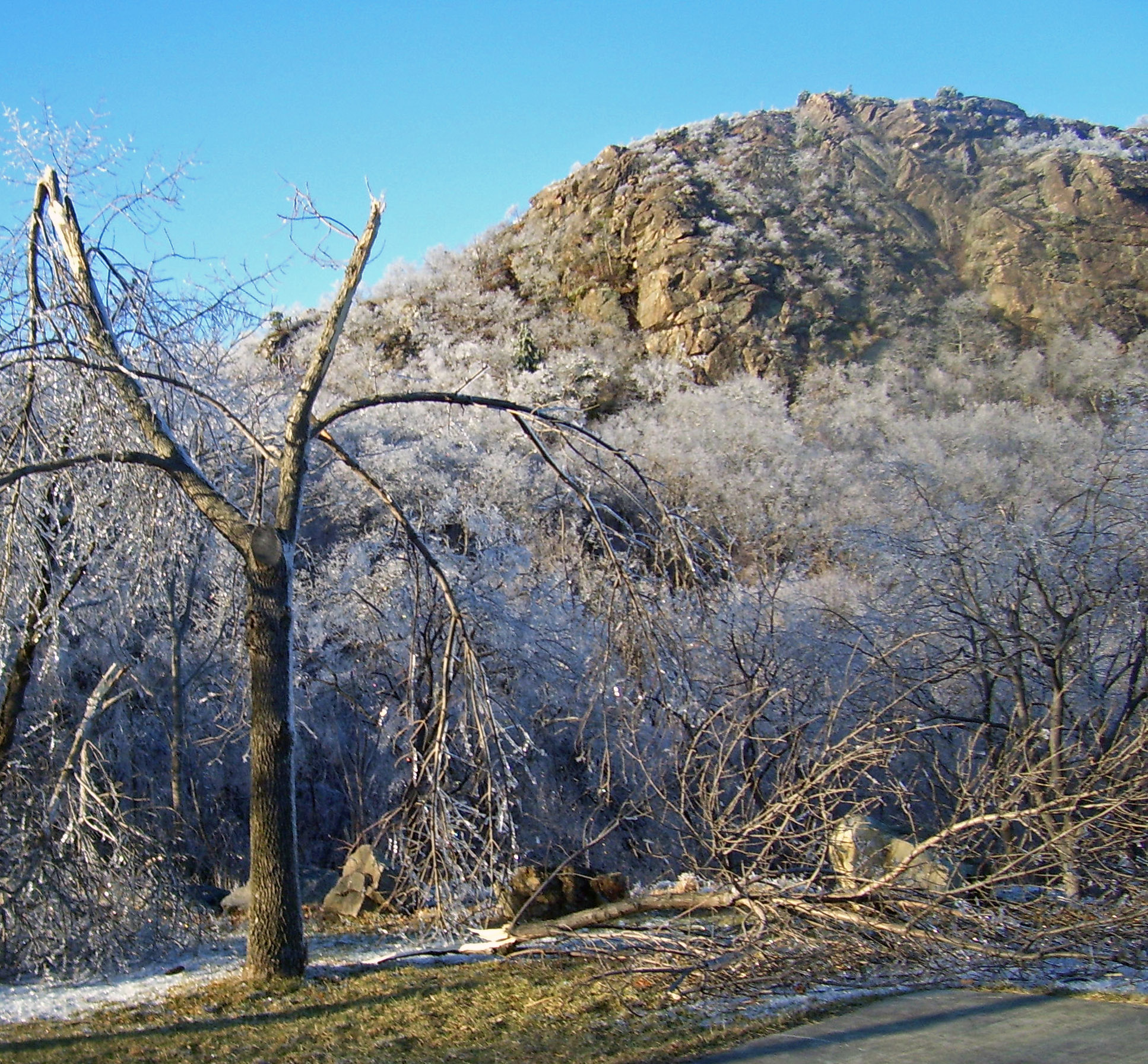
Damage at the Storm King Mountain trailhead, Cornwall, New York

== See also ==
- Freezing rain
- Global storm activity of 2008
- January 2009 North American ice storm
