= 2008–09 North American winter =

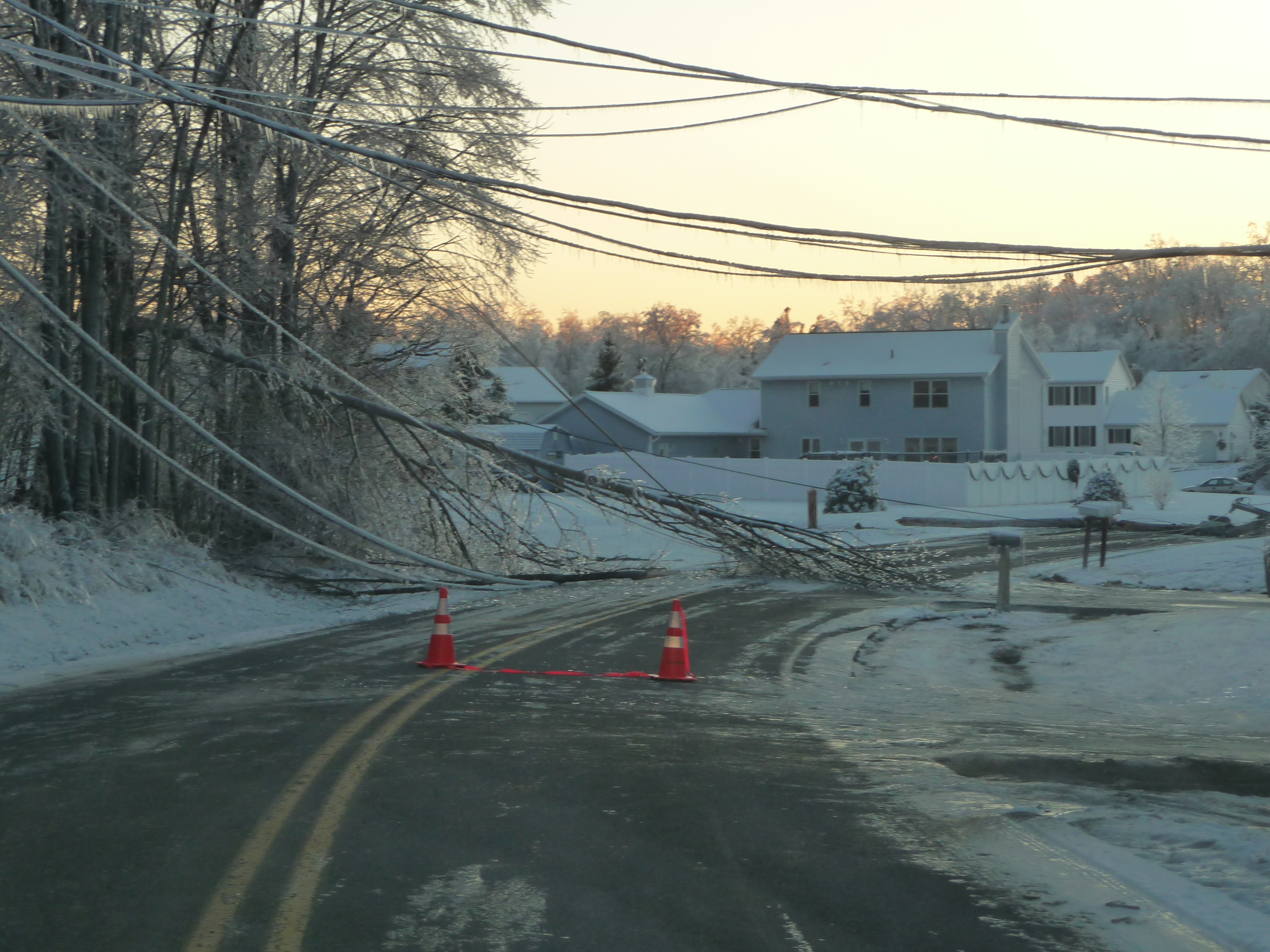
- Aftermath of a major ice storm in the Northeastern United States on December 13, 2008

Seasonal boundaries
- Meteorological winter: December 1 – February 28
- Astronomical winter: December 21 – March 20
- First event started: November 6, 2008
- Last event concluded: April 19, 2009

Most notable event
- Name: December 2008 North American snowstorms
  - Duration: December 18–22, 2008
  - Lowest pressure: 1,001 mb (29.56 inHg)
  - Fatalities: 8 fatalities
  - Damage: Unknown (2008 USD)

Seasonal statistics
- Total WPC-issued storms: 19 total
- Rated storms (RSI) (Cat. 1+): 10 total
- Major storms (RSI) (Cat. 3+): 1 total
- Total fatalities: 80 total
- Total damage: > $3.625 billion (2009 USD)

Related articles
- Weather of 2008

The 2008–09 North American winter was quite variable in terms of winter weather, influenced by neutral ENSO conditions. The Weather Prediction Center (WPC) tracked a total of 19 significant winter weather events during the season. A large portion of the Northern United States saw large amounts of snowfall, with several high-impact winter storms occurring. 10 events were rated on the Regional Snowfall Index (RSI), although only one managed to be rated above a Category 3 "Major" ranking, which was a significant and crippling late-season blizzard in March that affected the Central United States. Other significant events included crippling ice storms in the Northeast and Ohio Valley in December and January respectively, cold outbreaks in mid-January and a major nor'easter that affected the Eastern United States at the end of February into the first week of March. Collectively, the winter storms and related weather resulted in 80 deaths during the season and caused an estimated $3.62 billion (2009 USD) in damages, most of which came from the two ice storms in December and January.

While there is no well-agreed-upon date used to indicate the start of winter in the Northern Hemisphere, there are two definitions of winter which may be used. Based on the astronomical definition, winter begins at the winter solstice, which in 2008 occurred on December 21, and ends at the March equinox, which in 2009 occurred on March 20. Based on the meteorological definition, the first day of winter is December 1 and the last day February 28. Both definitions involve a period of approximately three months, with some variability.

== Seasonal forecasts ==
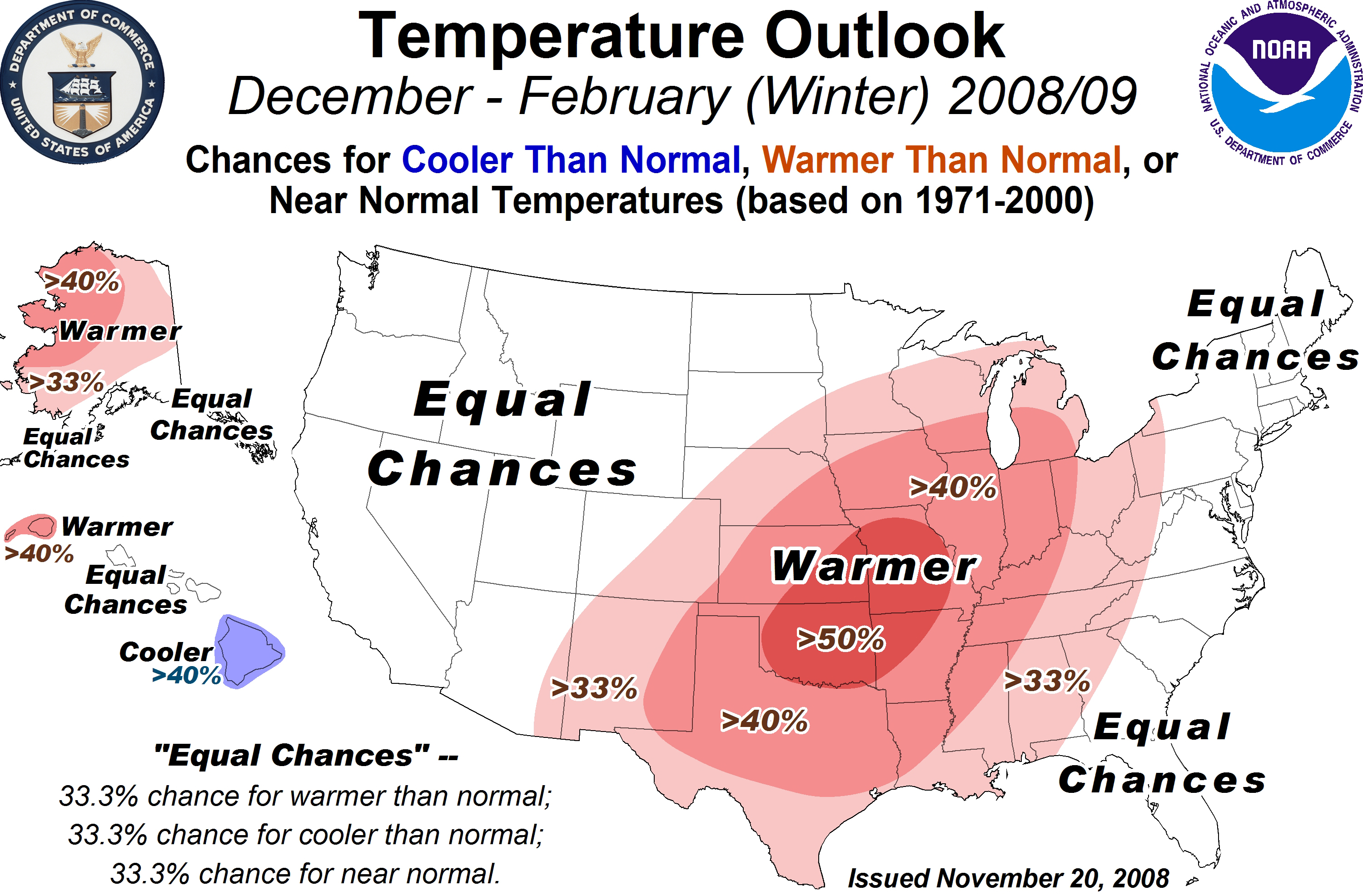
Temperature outlook

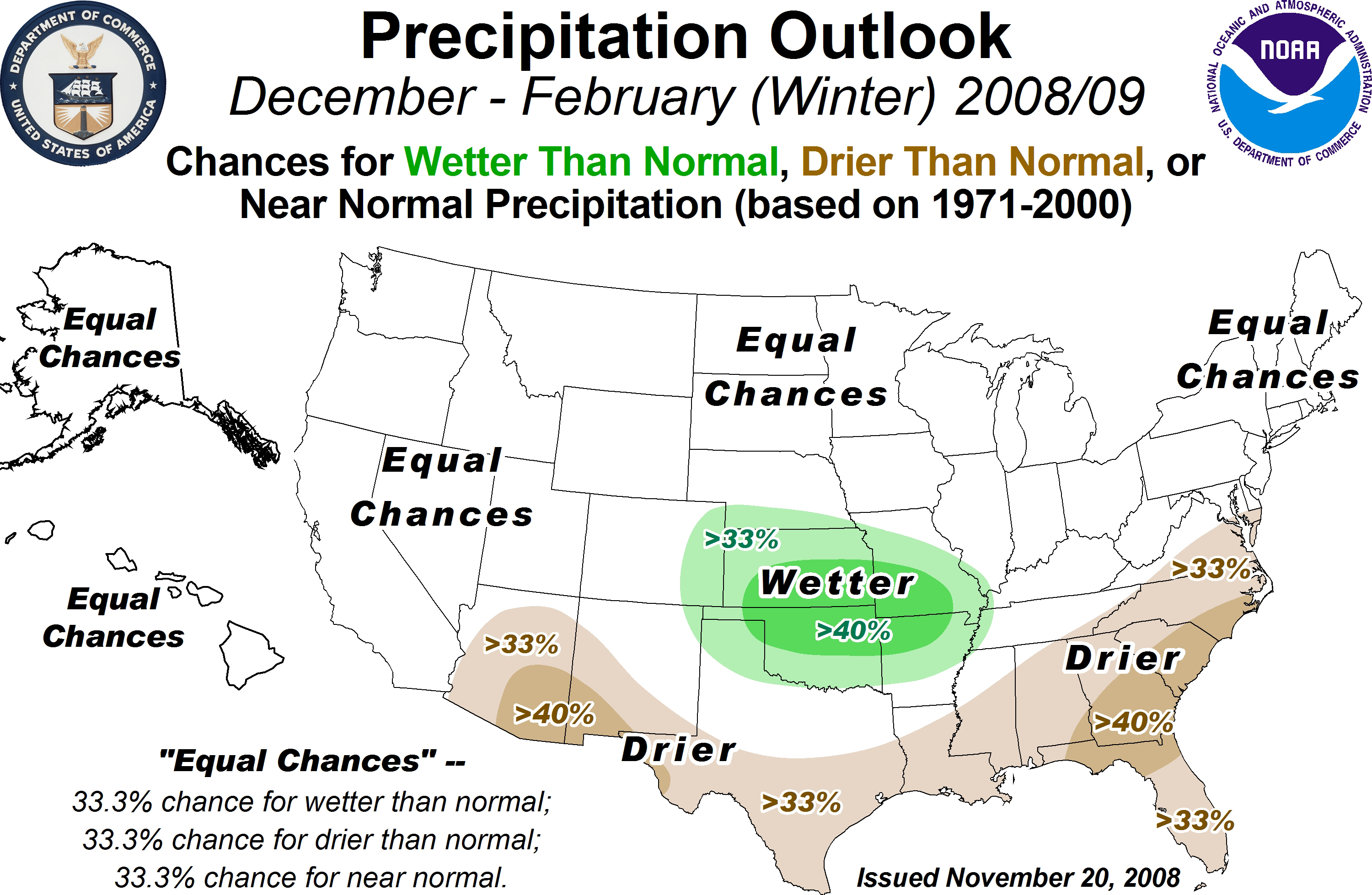
Precipitation outlook

On November 20, 2008, the National Oceanic and Atmospheric Administration's Climate Prediction Center issued its U.S. Winter Outlook. Citing the lack of an El Niño or La Niña event and the presence of neutral ENSO conditions, above-average temperatures were expected to be likely in the central United States. Precipitation was forecast to also be above average within the central U.S., primarily within the states of Kansas and Oklahoma. Further south along the Gulf Coast, below-average amounts of precipitation were expected, stretching from the Southwest to Southeast. Equal chances for near, above- or below-average temperatures were expected to prevail across the rest of the U.S. through the winter.

== Events ==
=== Early December Gulf Coast snowstorm ===
- Category 0 "Nuisance" (RSI/NOAA: N/A)
- Duration: December 10 – December 11, 2008
- Lowest pressure: 999 mb (29.50 inHg)
- Maximum snow: 6 in (15 cm)

Early on December 11, an extremely rare snowstorm occurred in southeastern Texas and most Louisiana as a result of an upper-level low moving eastwards through the region. Precipitation started out as rain across most of the state, with snow breaking out later as colder temperatures filtered in. Intense snowfall rates occurred leading to large snowfall totals. Beaumont, Texas saw the first December snowfall since 1989, and only the second time in recorded history that it had occurred. Additionally, the event was, at the time, the heaviest snowfall in the city's history, recording 1.8 inches (4.6 cm); this stood as the record until 2025. The maximum snowfall reported was 6 inches (15 cm) in a few regions northeast of Lafeyette, Louisiana. Thundersnow was also reported during the snowstorm as well.

=== Mid-December ice storm ===
- Category 0 "Nuisance" (RSI/NOAA: N/A)
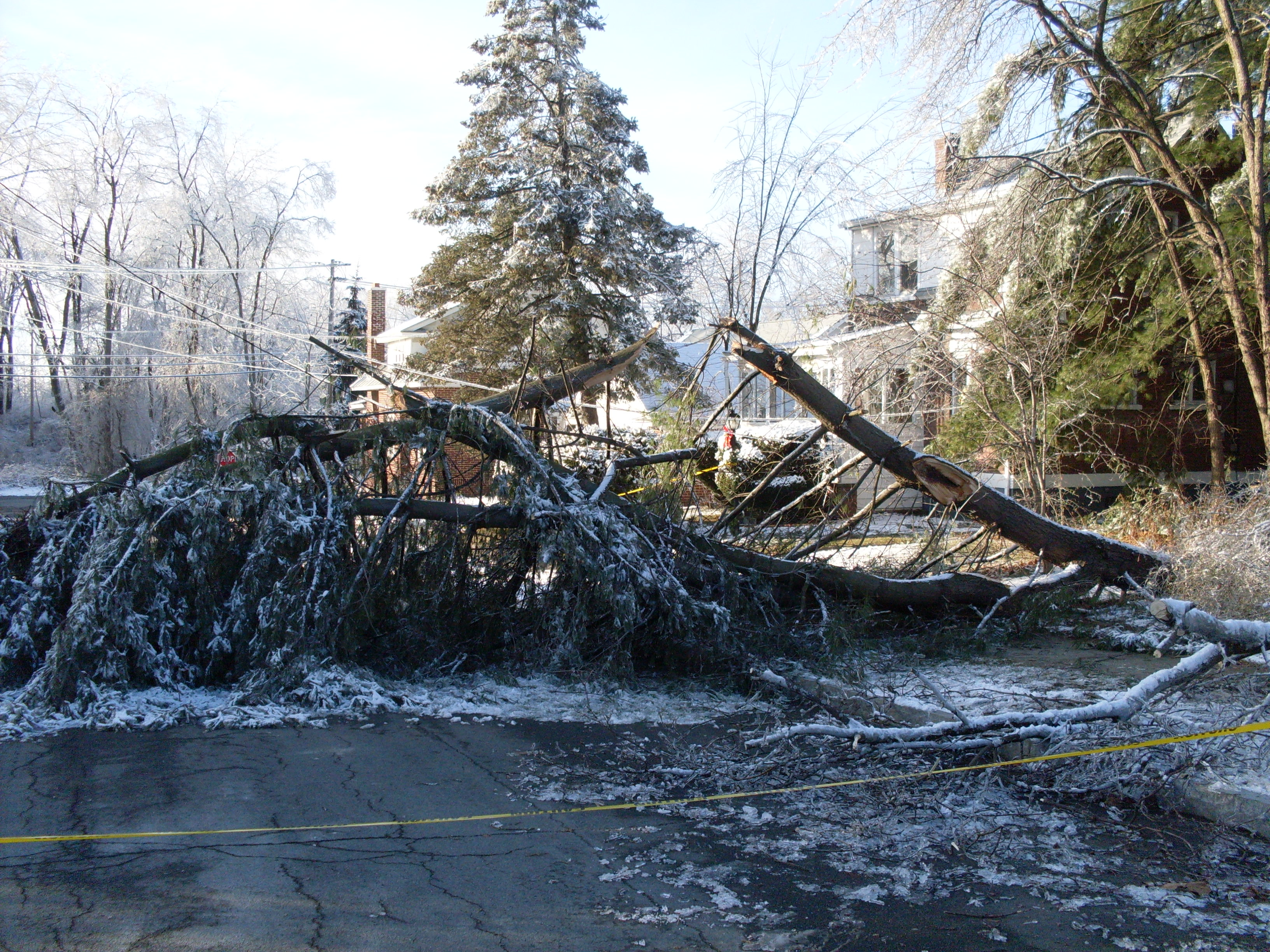
- Duration: December 11 – December 12, 2008
- Lowest pressure: 996 mb (29.41 inHg)
- Maximum snow: 10 in (25 cm)
- Fatalities: 5 fatalities
- Damage: $3.5 billion (2008 USD)

A damaging ice storm took out power for millions of people in the Northeastern United States in early December 2008. The storm was deemed the worst ice storm in a decade for New England and the most severe ice storm in 21 years for Upstate New York. Damage was primarily a result of fallen trees and fallen utility wires and poles, which were coated in a heavy layer of ice. The storm raised heavy controversy over the slow return of power, as at the storm's peak, as many as 1.7 million customers were without power. By Sunday evening, 14 December, 126,000 were still estimated to be without power. In Massachusetts up to one million residents and businesses lost power due to the storm, causing Governor Deval Patrick to declare a state of emergency and mobilize at least 500 National Guardsmen to help the clean-up efforts.

Governors John Lynch of New Hampshire and John Baldacci of Maine also declared a state of emergency, and as of 13 December at least 400,000 customers were without power in New Hampshire, and at least 172,000 were without power in Maine. This total in New Hampshire was more than five times larger than those who lost power in the ice storm of 1998, previously the most devastating storm on record. At least four deaths were attributed to the storm. Three of them were due to carbon monoxide poisoning, the source of which were gas-powered generators that were used indoors. One carbon-monoxide-related death was in New Hampshire, and the other two were in New York. The fourth fatality occurred in Massachusetts. A public works employee was found in a reservoir after having gone missing when investigating damage to trees.

=== Pre-Christmas snowstorms ===
- Category 1 "Notable" (RSI/NOAA: 2.645)
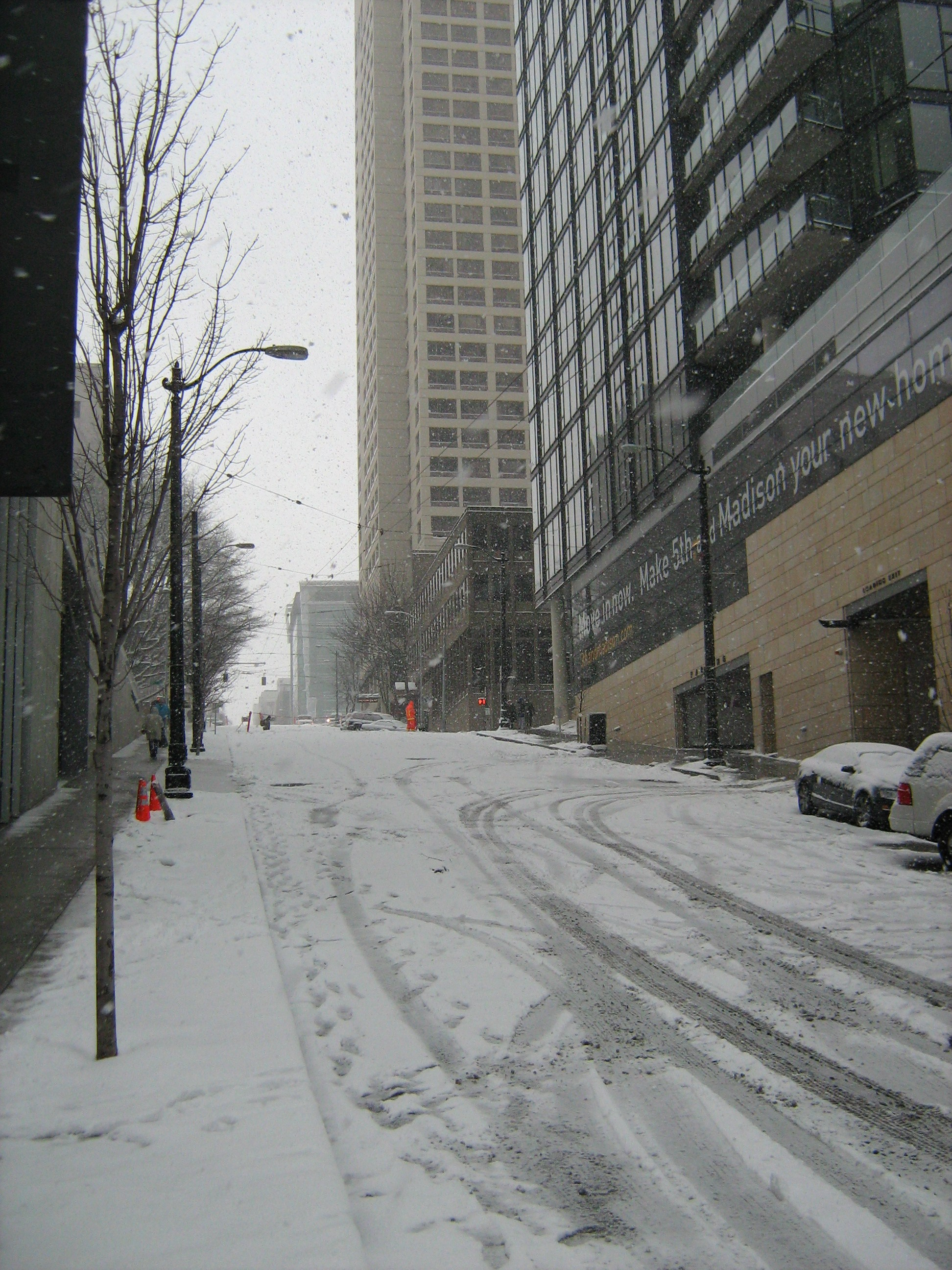
- Duration: December 18 – December 22, 2008
- Lowest pressure: 1001 mb (29.56 inHg)
- Maximum snow: 35 in (89 cm)
- Fatalities: 8 fatalities

A series of snowstorms before Christmas 2008 were responsible for the greatest December snowfall in Portland, Oregon, in 40 years (the snowiest December in Portland was 1884, with more than 31 inches (79 cm) of snow). The City of Portland reported spending an estimated $2.17 million on snow removal, deicing of roads, and employee overtime due to the record snowfall. Tri-Met suspended two-thirds of its bus lines. Hundreds of flights arriving and departing from Portland International Airport were canceled, leaving passengers and luggage stranded. Garbage services, privately run in the Portland area, were also canceled for over two weeks.

The winter weather greatly affected the Seattle area, where snow brought the city to a standstill and temperatures reached record lows. Many holiday travelers were unable to reach their destinations when Greyhound canceled bus service, airlines canceled flights at Seattle–Tacoma International Airport, and Amtrak shut down passenger service between Eugene, Oregon, and Vancouver, British Columbia.

The city of Seattle was criticized over its response to the snowfall. Mayor Greg Nickels initially gave the city a "B" for its response to the snowstorm, but the director of the Department of Transportation admitted the city should have done things differently. The Seattle Department of Transportation did not use salt on the icy roads, opting instead to put sand and a chemical de-icer on the roads. The snowplows used by the city did not clear the roads entirely of snow, instead creating a hard snow-packed surface; this was done to minimize damage to the roads.

=== Mid-January winter storms & cold wave ===
A major winter storm swept across the Great Lakes region and the U.S. Northeast. Areas of Toronto recorded between 15 and 25 cm, with 10 cm in Windsor, Ontario, & higher amounts towards the Lakes. Some areas reported more than 20 cm of accumulation. This same storm affected Northeastern United States with 10–30 cm, and the Atlantic provinces of Canada. Some areas have reported freezing rain and ice pellets, and even rain mixing in. U.S. Southeast saw mostly rain.

=== Late January ice storm ===
- Category 0 "Nuisance" (RSI/NOAA: N/A)
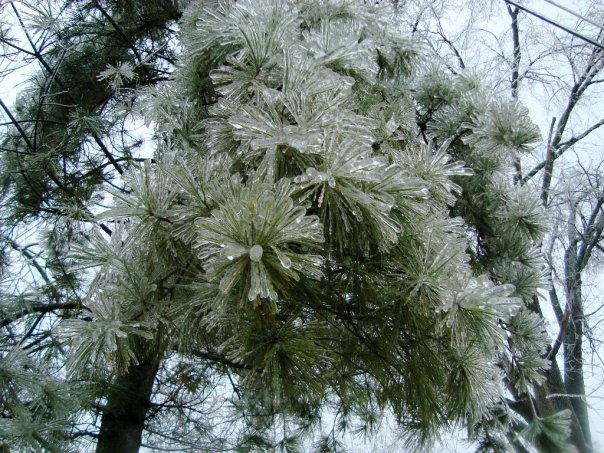
- Duration: January 25 – January 30, 2009
- Lowest pressure: 1008 mb (29.77 inHg)
- Maximum snow: 13 in (33 cm)
- Fatalities: 65 fatalities
- Damage: $125 million (2009 USD)

A major ice storm impacted parts of Kansas, Oklahoma, Arkansas, Missouri, Illinois, Indiana, Ohio, West Virginia, Tennessee, and Kentucky in late January. The storm produced widespread power outages for over 2 million people due to heavy ice accumulation. The hardest-hit areas were in Kentucky with over 500,000 residences without power during the height of the storm, including 100,000 without power for over one week, and northern Arkansas, with 300,000 residences without power. This ice storm killed 65 people nationwide and 35 in Kentucky. Most deaths were attributed to carbon monoxide poisoning due to power generators or kerosene heaters being used indoors without proper ventilation. Kentucky Governor Steve Beshear called up the entire Kentucky Army National Guard to deal with the after-effects of this storm, the largest National Guard call up in that state's history. Mammoth Cave National Park closed due to the storm.

Emergency response teams from NRWA state affiliates, including the Arkansas, Kentucky, Oklahoma, Missouri, and Florida rural water associations, provided portable generators and technical assistance to maintain the water supply in the impacted areas.

=== Early February storm complex ===
On February 11, behind a powerful system responsible for a tornado outbreak, a tight pressure-gradient behind the cold front led to a large area of damaging non-thunderstorm winds across the Midwest and Ohio Valley. This squall line continued to renew its energy as it passed through the Midwest, Pennsylvania, New Jersey, New York, and New England, causing wind and water damage, and dumping 6 inches (15 cm) of snow in central and eastern Massachusetts. The resulting power outages affected homes throughout the northeastern seaboard. Westerly winds and enhanced moisture from lakes led to 3 to 6 in (7.6 to 15.2 cm) of snow falling in parts of The Berkshires.

=== Mid-February winter storm ===
A winter storm that developed over Colorado brought messy weather across the Great plains, Midwest U.S., the Great Lakes and Northeast United States. Some areas had a messy mix of snow, ice and rain. Toronto had seen about 10 cm. South Western Ontario saw between 1–10 cm. Northern Areas of Ontario and Quebec received between 10 and 25 cm. Eastern Ontario received between 10 and 20 cm. The northeast saw local amounts of over 15 cm. From Midwestern sections of the U.S. to the Southern Lakes messy mix was reported with rain at times. Southern United States saw heavy amounts of rainfall, Thunderstorms and Tornado warnings were issued in some areas.

=== Late February–early March nor'easter ===
- Category 2 "Significant" (RSI/NOAA: 3.423)
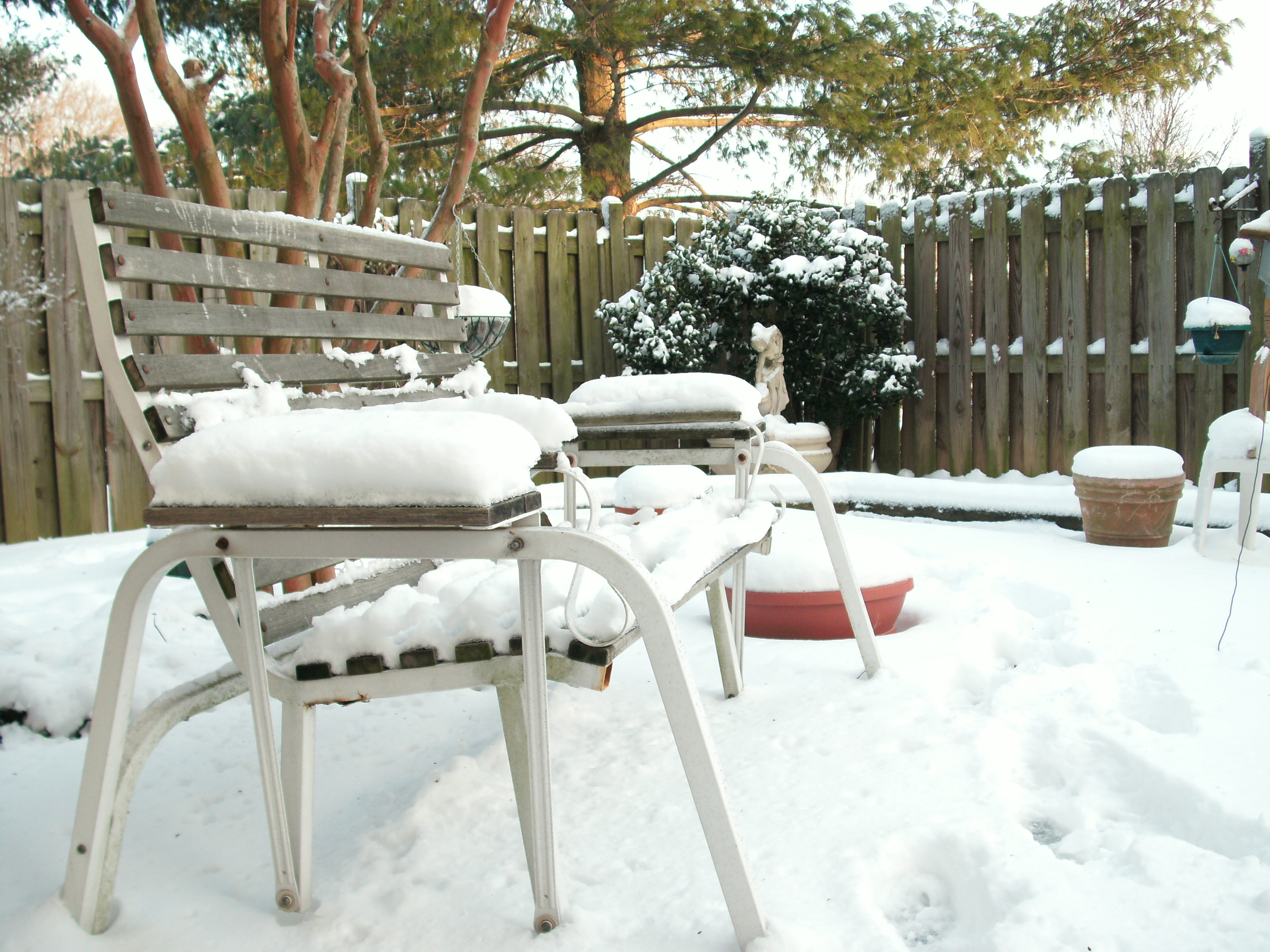
- Duration: February 26 – March 3, 2009
- Lowest pressure: 999 mb (29.50 inHg)
- Maximum snow: 16 in (41 cm)

A major nor'easter affected the eastern U.S. in the last few days of February into the first week of March. On March 1, a strengthening area of low pressure brought 12–18 inches (30–46 cm) to the southern parts near the Appalachian Mountains and the Southeastern United States. As the storm intensified and tracked northeastwards, it moved into and paralleled the Mid-Atlantic states and New England the following day. Gusty winds and heavy snowfall stretched across a wide region of the Northeast causing many disruptions. The maximum snowfall recorded was 16 inches (41 cm) in Mount Mitchell, North Carolina, while a more general area of 6–12 inches (15–30 cm) was recorded across the storm path, including 9.5 in (24 cm) in Philadelphia, Pennsylvania, 8 in (20 cm) in New York City, and heavier amounts near 1 foot (12 in; 30 cm) in New Jersey.

Hundreds of flights were cancelled across the Northeast, and people in Virginia were stranded on a train overnight after snow and ice caused delays due to fallen trees and snow covered tracks. In South Carolina, wintry weather caused multiple car crashes and accidents closing Interstate 85 for as much as 10 hours. Power outages also were very prevalent across the affected regions from the South into Maine.

=== Late March blizzard ===
- Category 4 "Crippling" (RSI/NOAA: 14.952)
- Duration: March 27 – March 30, 2009
- Lowest pressure: 988 mb (29.18 inHg)
- Maximum snow: 28 in (71 cm)
- Fatalities: 2 fatalities

A major blizzard hit Denver and other counties around the area on Thursday, March 26. Parts of the Front Range saw 18 inches (460 mm) of snow and schools around Denver were closed early. Denver International Airport canceled more than 400 planes departing and arriving. On Friday, March 27, the storm impacted Kansas, northwestern Oklahoma, and the Texas Panhandle, with 12 to 24 inches (610 mm) of snow and blizzard conditions. Some areas around Pratt County, Kansas and Kiowa County, Kansas received 28" of Snowfall. Snow Drifts reached 10 feet (3.0 m) high in Dalhart, Texas. On Friday night and into Saturday, March 28, the storm system impacted the Kansas City area and northern parts of Missouri, before moving into the Quad Cities area, Northern Illinois and Southern Wisconsin on Saturday night. Numerous areas here saw between 4 and 8" of snow. Waukegan, Illinois, saw around half a foot from this late-season winter blast. At least two people were killed as a result of the blizzard.

== Records ==
=== Canada ===
Canada had the first "nationwide" white Christmas since 1971. The series of snowstorms broke a 44-year-old record for the snowiest Christmas ever, with up to 28 inches (71 cm) of snow accumulated in some parts of the South Coast. It was the first "official" white Christmas in Vancouver since 1998. In fact, Vancouver would be the Canadian city with the greatest snow depth for the Christmas Day of 2008.

== See also ==
- List of major snow and ice events in the United States
- Weather of 2008
- Weather of 2009

Preceded by 2007–08	North American winters 2008–09	Succeeded by 2009–10
