= List of ice storms =

This is a list of notable ice storms.

== 1921 ==
A four-day ice storm from November 26-29, 1921 battered central Massachusetts.

== 1940s ==
- Great Ice Storm of November 23–25, 1940.

== 1950s ==
- Great Ice Storm of 1951.

== 1970s ==
- Wisconsin Ice Storm of 1976, March 4-5.
- Twin North Carolina Ice Storms of January 12–13 and 19-20, 1978

== 1990s ==
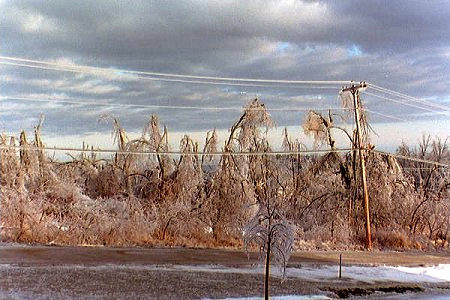
Tree damage caused by the North American Ice Storm of 1998

- Western and Northern NY Ice Storm of March 3–4, 1991
- Ice Storm of 1994 Considered one of the worst ice storms in US History.
- January 1998 North American ice storm
- January 1999 North American ice storm

== 2000s ==
- 2002 Central Plains ice storm
- North Carolina ice storm of 2002
- December 2005 North American ice storm
- January 2007 North American ice storm
- Mid-December 2007 North American winter storms
- December 2008 Northeastern United States ice storm
- January 2009 North American ice storm

== 2010s ==
- 2011 Groundhog Day blizzard
- December 2013 North American storm complex
- 2014 Dinaric ice storm
- February 2014 nor'easter
- December 15–17, 2018 United Kingdom ice storm

== 2020s ==
- 10-27-2020 Oklahoma City ice Storm
- 2020-21 New Year's North American storm complex
- February 2021 North American ice storm
- January 14–17, 2022 North American winter storm
- January 31 – February 2, 2023, ice storm
- 2023 Canada ice storm
- March 30, 2025 Michigan ice storm
- January 2026 North American winter storm

== See also ==
- List of blizzards
- List of weather records
- Lowest temperature recorded on Earth
