= Toronto blackout =

The Toronto blackout may refer to:

- Northeast Blackout of 1965, which affected the entire city of Toronto
- Northeast Blackout of 2003, which affected the entire city of Toronto
- 2009 Toronto blackout, which affected a huge swath of the city's southwest end from January 15–16, 2009.
- December 2013 North American storm complex, which affected most of the city of Toronto.
