= January 2017 North American ice storm =

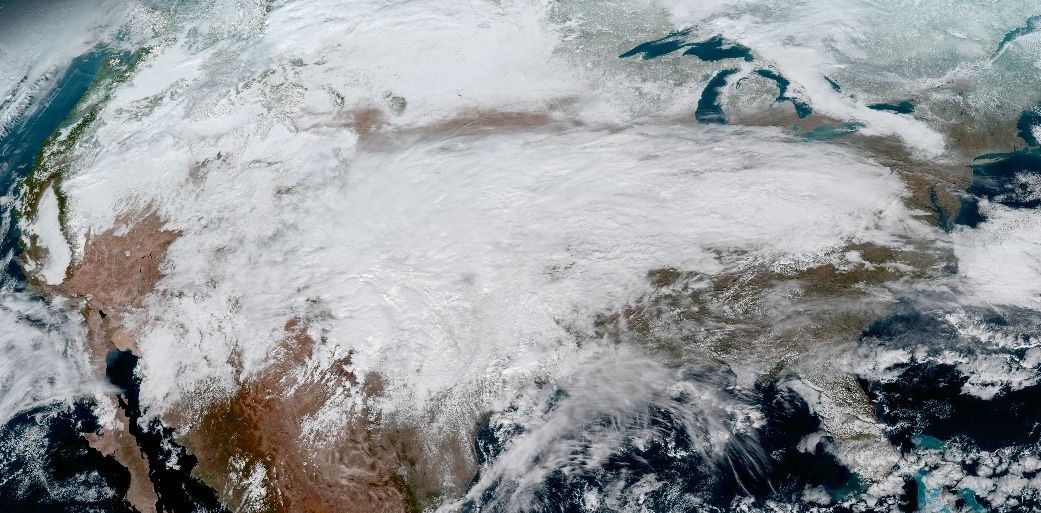
- The storm system over the United States as viewed by GOES-16 on January 15, 2017

Meteorological history
- Formed: January 10, 2017
- Dissipated: January 17, 2017

Tornado outbreak
- Tornadoes: 11
- Max. rating: EF2 tornado
- Lowest pressure: 1006 hPa (mbar); 29.71 inHg
- Max. snowfall: 29.5 inches (75 cm) at Red Mountain Pass, Colorado

Overall effects
- Fatalities: 9
- Areas affected: Pacific Northwest, Southwestern United States, Midwestern United States, Great Plains
- Part of the 2016–17 North American winter and tornado outbreaks of 2017

The January 2017 North American ice storm was a major ice storm that impacted the Great Plains, Pacific Northwest, and American Midwest. During the storm, multiple U.S. states declared states of emergency, and icy road conditions caused traffic incidents and fatalities. It was Named Winter Storm Jupiter by the weather channel. An outbreak of 11 tornadoes also struck Texas, injuring two.

== Meteorological history ==
In mid-January, an unusual surge of atmospheric moisture surged into northwestern Mexico associated with an upper-level low near California. This moisture began to move into the High Plains and Central United States by the jet stream ahead of the low late on January 13, and, with below-freezing temperatures at the surface in much of Oklahoma, northern Texas, and Kansas, freezing rain began to explode into existence. The frozen precipitation continued to blossom as the day progressed. The low began to inject the aforementioned moisture into the state of Texas and Oklahoma as it slowly moved east-northeastwards across the Baja California peninsula and across the northern Gulf of California throughout the day on January 14. Meanwhile, icy conditions continued in much of the Central United States.

By late on January 14, a surface low developed east of the upper-low as it moved swiftly towards the United States–Mexico border. The surface low, while intensifying, as a result of interaction with the incoming moisture, developed a squall line of thunderstorms along its cold front, as it and the upper-low emerged into the Southwestern United States. The entire storm system continued to push northeastwards through the state of Texas on January 15. In advance of the squall line that was moving rapidly to the east, scattered supercell thunderstorms popped up, and at one point during the nighttime hours, a tornado warning had to be issued for the Dallas–Fort Worth metroplex, a rare occurrence.

== Preparations and impact ==
=== West ===
==== Oregon ====
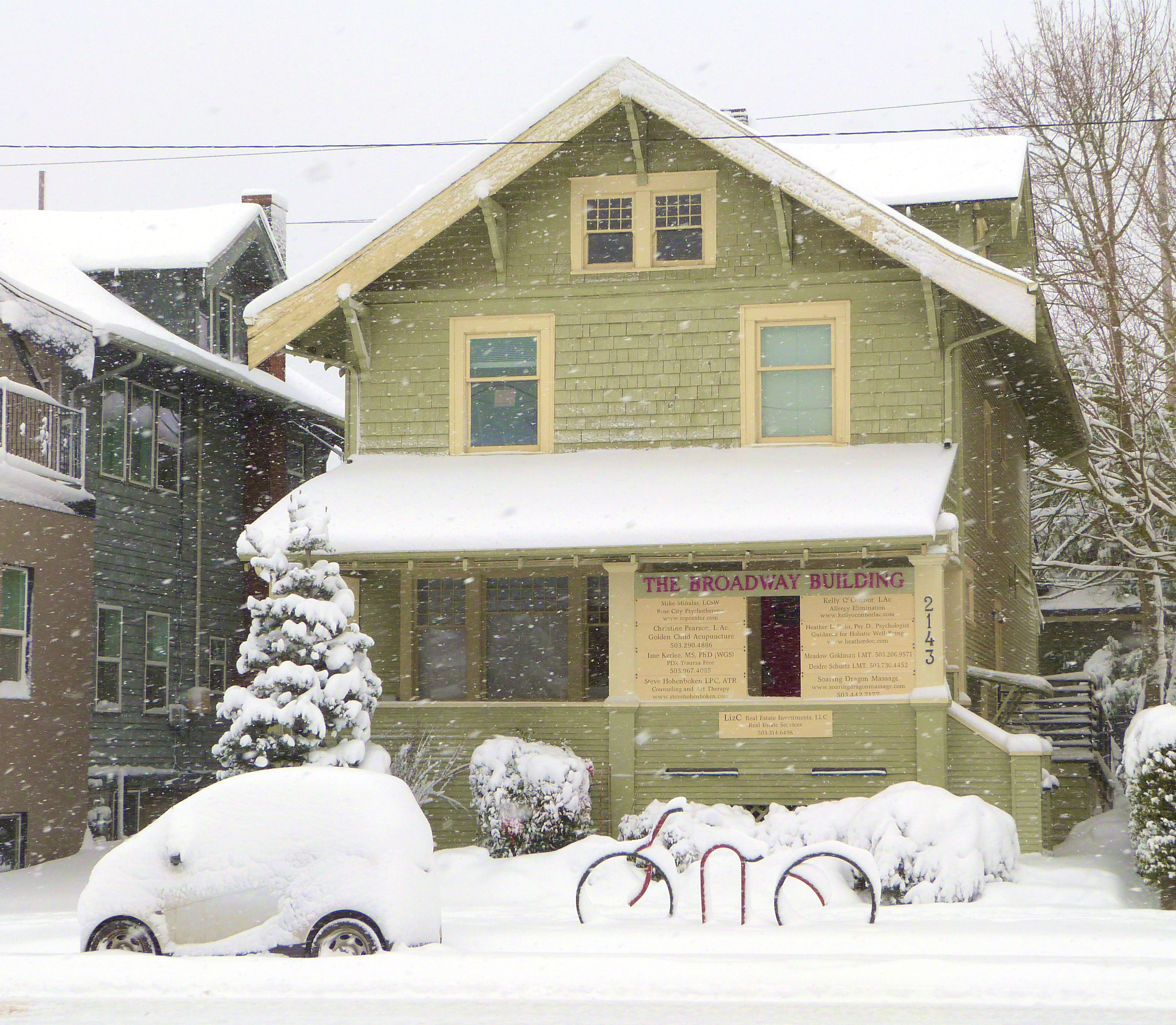
Snow covered car in Portland, Oregon

The storm impacted Portland, Oregon on January 10, 2017. Blizzard conditions caused Interstate 84 to close between Troutdale, Oregon and Hood River, Oregon. Governor Kate Brown declared a state of emergency in Oregon, and the mayor Ted Wheeler declared a state of emergency for the city of Portland, Oregon on January 11. Downtown Portland received 11 inches of snow in a 12-hour period, making it the largest snowstorm for the city in twenty years. Crater Lake National Park temporarily closed due to the snow, as well as an avalanche caused by the storm.

==== California ====
On January 13, 2017, the storm caused snowfall in the mountains near San Diego.

=== Midwest ===
==== Missouri ====
On January 13, 2017, the storm covered Missouri with freezing rain, causing hazardous driving conditions and scattered power outages. Lambert Airport canceled most of its flights due to the ice. Missouri Governor Eric Greitens declared a state of emergency and called up the Missouri National Guard. The Missouri Department of Transportation reported that it responded to about 100 crashes on January 13, 2017. A woman from Crystal City, Missouri died while driving in on an ice-covered bridge. The start time of a National Football League divisional playoff game between the Kansas City Chiefs and Pittsburgh Steelers in Kansas City, Missouri on January 15 was changed from 12:05 p.m. CST to 7:20 p.m. CST due to the weather forecast.

On January 14, two more traffic fatalities were attributed to the effects of the storm. One man from Ravenwood, Missouri slid off the road while another man died in a pileup.

==== Kansas ====
The National Weather Service issued a winter storm watch for southern Kansas on January 11, 2017. In Dodge City, where 1 inch (2.5 cm) of ice accumulated, so many downed trees blocked roads that school buses could not run on January 18. The Kansas National Guard helped stranded motorists and provided emergency transportation on January 13, 2017. On January 14, the storm caused a pileup of 20 vehicles, causing two injuries. The Victory Electric Cooperative Association reported 5,800 power outages on January 15, of which 1,175 outages remained on January 18.

==== Nebraska and Iowa ====
The National Weather Service issued ice storm warnings on January 14, 2017 for southeastern Nebraska and southern Iowa. Residents in these areas were urged stay indoors during the storm and to prepare by buying food, water, and fuel.

Icy conditions contributed to a fiery crash between two semitrailer trucks on Interstate 80 near Kearney, Nebraska on January 15, and no injuries were reported. The University of Nebraska–Lincoln canceled classes on January 17 due to the road conditions. Since 2016 was an abnormally dry year for Nebraska, some local farmers appreciated the moisture from the storm.

On January 15, the storm left 1/3 inch (0.85 cm) of ice on some parts of Iowa, and hundreds of crews were sent to clear the roads.

=== Great Plains ===
==== Oklahoma ====
On January 12, 2017, Oklahoma Governor Mary Fallin declared a state of emergency. The next day, some schools and government offices were closed for the storm. Many Oklahoma residents responded to these warnings by buying groceries and generators. An accident in Weatherford, Oklahoma on January 14 left at least one person dead. Road conditions stranded several vehicles in Oologah, Oklahoma, and Interstate 40 was closed due to multiple accidents.

==== Texas ====
On January 15–16, the ice storm impacted Texas, creating severe storms and tornadoes in South Clifton and in the counties Bosque and Hill. In the end, 11 tornadoes were confirmed. After a January 15 NFL game between the Dallas Cowboys and Green Bay Packers at the AT&T Stadium, a tornado warning caused thousands to stay in the stadium until weather conditions improved.

== Confirmed tornadoes ==
Confirmed tornadoes by Enhanced Fujita rating
EFU	EF0	EF1	EF2	EF3	EF4	EF5	Total
0	6	3	2	0	0	0	11

=== January 15 event ===
List of confirmed tornadoes – Sunday, January 15, 2017 (Note: All dates are based on the local time zone where the tornado touched down; however, all times are in Coordinated Universal Time for consistency.)
EF#	Location	County / Parish	State	Start Coord.	Time (UTC)	Path length	Max width
EF0	W of Madisonville	Madison	TX	30.9217°N 96.114°W	21:48–21:50	1.25 mi (2.01 km)	20 yd (18 m)
EF0	A tornado captured on video caused minor tree damage.						
EF2	NE of Gatesville	Coryell, Bosque	TX	31.49°N 97.67°W	23:45–00:05	12.92 mi (20.79 km)	200 yd (180 m)
EF2	A few houses were damaged, including two that lost most of their roofs. Several barns, storage sheds, and pieces of farm machinery were damaged, and several power poles were broken. Total economic losses reached $500,000.						
EF1	Clifton	Bosque	TX	31.77°N 97.58°W	00:17–00:20	1.38 mi (2.22 km)	120 yd (110 m)
EF1	Approximately 20–30 houses in Clifton sustained damage, and several trees were uprooted. Total economic losses reached $90,000.						
EF1	W of Whitney	Bosque, Hill	TX	31.92°N 97.42°W	00:38–00:50	5.8 mi (9.3 km)	200 yd (180 m)
EF1	Numerous homes, a church, and a marina were damaged, mainly to roofs and shingles; ten of the houses were severely damaged. Two people were injured. Total economic losses reached $290,000.						
EF2	SE of Brady	McCulloch	TX	31.0817°N 99.2111°W	01:00–01:05	1.99 mi (3.20 km)	450 yd (410 m)
EF2	Numerous large trees had their trunks snapped off or were uprooted. No property damage occurred.						
EF0	SE of Mansfield	Johnson, Tarrant	TX	32.52°N 97.12°W	02:11–02:14	3.07 mi (4.94 km)	40 yd (37 m)
EF0	Metal buildings, one barn, and one house were damaged. Total economic losses reached $75,000.						
EF0	Grand Prairie	Dallas	TX	32.69°N 97.034°W	02:43–02:45	0.31 mi (0.50 km)	80 yd (73 m)
EF0	Fences were downed, while businesses, homes, and a hangar sustained minor damage. Grand Prairie Municipal Airport recorded a peak gust of 63 mph (101 km/h). Total economic losses reached $120,000.						

=== January 16 event ===
List of confirmed tornadoes – Monday, January 16, 2017
EF#	Location	County / Parish	State	Start Coord.	Time (UTC)	Path length	Max width
EF1	W of Mexia	Limestone	TX	31.69°N 96.55°W	08:43–08:48	3.13 mi (5.04 km)	250 yd (230 m)
EF1	At least six buildings were damaged, one of which was destroyed. Total economic losses reached $300,000.						
EF0	N of Jersey Village	Harris	TX	29.9302°N 95.5648°W	13:31–13:32	0.1 mi (0.16 km)	20 yd (18 m)
EF0	Three houses sustained roof and window damage, with fencing downed and also lifted onto the roof of a house.						
EF0	WNW of Spring	Harris	TX	30.0850°N 95.4498°W	14:35–14:36	0.1 mi (0.16 km)	20 yd (18 m)
EF0	Numerous small limbs and pine needles were downed.						
EF0	NNW of Spring	Montgomery	TX	30.1276°N 95.4339°W	14:40–14:41	0.2 mi (0.32 km)	20 yd (18 m)
EF0	A store had its door window broken, loose debris was blown around, and a large tree was snapped.						

== See also ==
- January 2007 North American ice storm
- December 2013 North American storm complex
- January 4–8, 2017, North American winter storm
- December 2015 North American storm complex
- 2017 California floods
