= December 2005 North American ice storm =

Weather event in the United States and Canada

The December 2005 North American ice storm was a damaging winter storm that produced extensive ice damage in a large portion of the Southern United States from December 14–16, 2005, while extensive snowfall was reported across portions of the Canadian provinces of Ontario and Quebec. The ice storm led to enormous and widespread power outages, and at least 7 deaths.

== Background ==
The storm was triggered by a deep low pressure system formed over the Gulf of Mexico on 14 December 2005, which began moving northward. At the same time, cold arctic air from northern Canada penetrated deep into the central United States and lowered the temperatures at the surface while warm air from the Gulf Stream remained at the coast. A second Alberta clipper farther north also added additional energy to the system.

The precipitation remained as rain in the coastal areas, including the large cities from Boston to Washington, D.C. However, freezing rain was extensive in the inland areas, including around Atlanta, where the temperatures remained just below freezing for extended periods. The freezing rain persisted for many hours, leading to extensive ice damage.

== Impact ==
Casualties
State	Total	County	County total	Direct deaths
Georgia	1	Gwinnett	1	0
Maryland	2	Unknown	2	0
North Carolina	4	Cabarrus	1	1
North Carolina	4	Granville	1	0
North Carolina	4	Rockingham	1	0
North Carolina	4	Wilkes	1	0
Totals	7			1

Trees and power lines, along with numerous other lightweight structures, came down in many areas from Georgia northward, and highways (including several Interstate Highways) were closed and impassable. The heaviest ice accretions were in southwestern North Carolina, where ice over 3/4 inch (19 mm) thick was reported and Charlottesville, Virginia with 1 inch (25 mm). At the higher elevations, and farther north across the Great Lakes region and into northern New England, the storm produced heavy snow with amounts varying between 7 inches to as high as 26 inches (66 cm).

In Canada, 41 centimetres of snow fell in Montreal in about 12 hours, with snowfall rates as high as 30 centimetres in 4 hours, and 11 centimetres in a one-hour period during the morning rush hour on December 16. This is the second worst storm on record, after a storm on March 4, 1971, dumped 47 centimetres and the worst fall snowstorm to hit the area since records were kept. In Ottawa, between 20 and 35 centimetres fell in a short period of time causing several OC Transpo buses to become stuck on the city's transitway and several of their articulated buses to become jackknifed at a busy intersection in the suburb of Gatineau, Quebec.

In addition, at least seven deaths were blamed on the weather, one of them directly related to weather conditions. One of the deaths was as a result of a tree that fell into a home and crashed into a man in Kannapolis, North Carolina, one as a result of a faulty generator in a house without power, and the other five as a result of traffic accidents.

=== Power outage ===
The ice storm left more than a million people without power in and near the Appalachians, including 630,000 customers in Georgia, 358,000 in South Carolina, 328,000 in North Carolina and 13,000 in Virginia. It took over a week to restore power. Several emergency shelters also were opened. Electricity was not restored in many places until 20 December 2005, by which time one death was blamed on the outage.

== See also ==
- North American Ice Storm of 1998
