= 2023 Canada ice storm =

Ice storm

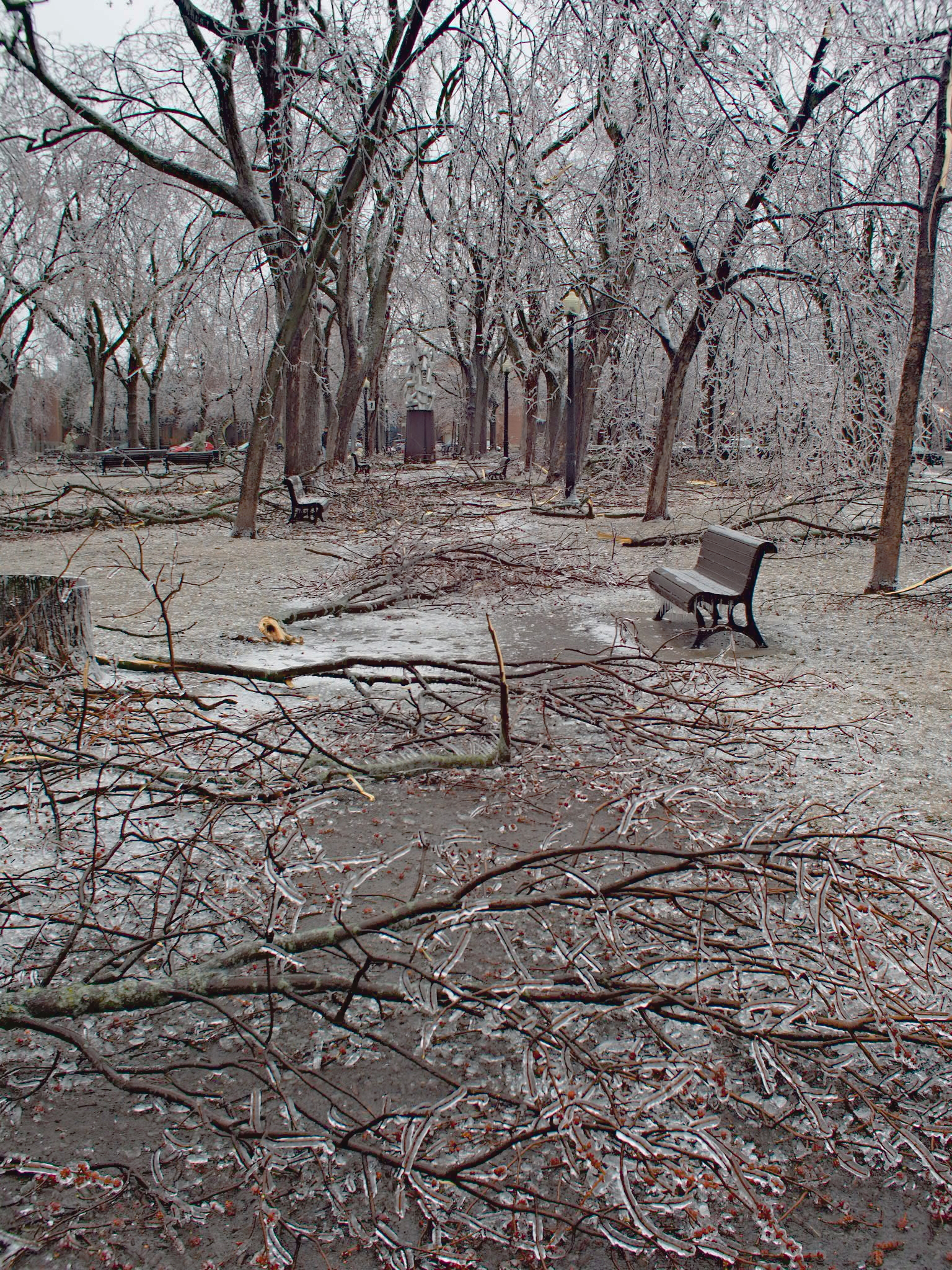
- The day after the ice storm in Molson Park, Montreal

Meteorological history
- Formed: 5 April 2023
- Dissipated: 6 April 2023

Ice storm
- Max. snowfall: 40 millimetres (1.57 in)

Overall effects
- Fatalities: 4
- Areas affected: Eastern Canada, primarily Quebec and Ontario
- Power outages: 1.3 million

On April 5, 2023, the 2023 Canadian ice storm devastated Quebec and Ontario, knocked out electricity for more than a million people, resulted in fatalities, and severely damaged property and infrastructure.

== Synopsis ==
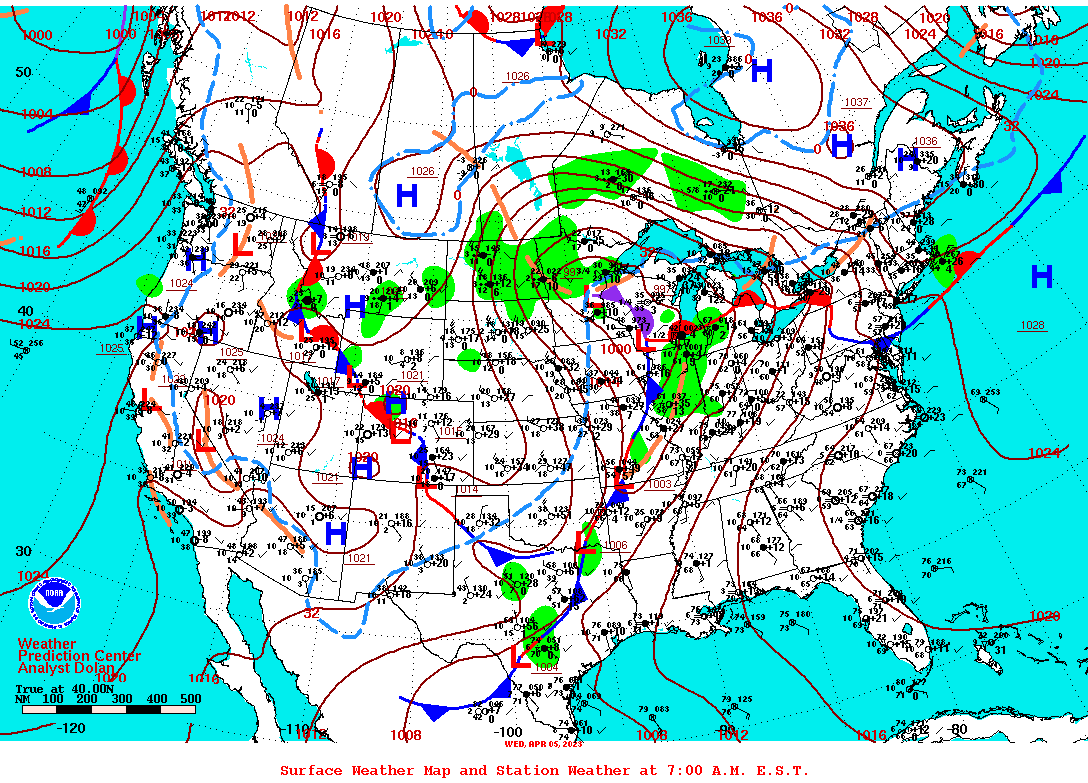
Surface map on April 5, 2023 at 12 UTC (7 AM EST).

On April 5, a major low-pressure system crossing Lake Superior pushed a warm front toward eastern Ontario and western Quebec while a high-pressure area over eastern Ontario siphoned cold air into the St. Lawrence and Ottawa River Valleys. The mild air aloft ahead of the front produced rain, but the air was below freezing at the surface, which froze the water droplets into ice.

This freezing rain began in eastern Ontario, particularly in Ottawa, before daybreak and a few hours later in the Montreal area. The phenomenon, accompanied by thunderstorms, persisted there all day, producing accumulations of 15 to 40 millimetres (0.59 to 1.57 in). The warm front moved northeastward, affecting Quebec City, the southern Maritimes and New England, while precipitation became snow with a small amount of freezing rain during its progression.

On April 6, once it had passed through the warm sector of the depression that had reached northern Quebec, temperatures rose well above 0 °C, which melted the accumulations of ice.

== Impacts ==
The two most populous provinces in Canada, Ontario and Quebec, were most severely impacted by the natural catastrophe, with the worst power outage in Quebec since the 1998 ice storm brought on by toppled power lines and blocked roadways. Thousands of branches and trees snapped under the weight of the ice storm and the force of the winds. The most affected regions were Ottawa, Montreal-Laval, Montérégie, Outaouais and the Laurentides. According to Hydro-Québec, approximately 1.1 million customers lost power in that province, half of whom were on the island of Montreal. In Ontario, Hydro One reported that more than 114,000 customers were in the same situation and 56,000 at Hydro Ottawa.

Four people died as a consequence of the storm's effects: one was crushed by a falling limb in Quebec, another was killed by a falling tree in Ontario, a man died of carbon monoxide poisoning while using his barbecue inside his home near Montreal and the fourth victim died in a car accident in the Laurier-Station area, south of Quebec City. The Montreal Regional Public Health Department (DRSP) recorded 127 cases of poisoning by carbon monoxide while many were trying to warm up or cook indoors with an appliance designed for outdoor use.

== Response ==
The weather warnings were cancelled after the event and the situation was under control, according to the authorities, but they nevertheless recommended care because it would take many weeks to repair the damage brought on by the ice storm. The majority of the power outages were repaired after 5 days, but it took up to a week to reconnect some isolated areas. Shelters were opened to accommodate the victims, offering food and warmth. While encouraging locals to stay away from downed power lines and to avoid going in forested areas where trees loaded with ice may topple, emergency workers worked to clean roadways and reconnect power lines. On May 15, the city of Montreal announced that it would take another month to collect the branches that had fallen from its parks.

== Political reactions ==
François Legault, the premier of Quebec, emphasized the dangers of extreme weather conditions and the rising probability that they may occur as a result of climate change.

Canadian Prime Minister Justin Trudeau, who was present in Montreal at the time, described the storm as a trying period for residents of Montreal and others who had been impacted by the tragedy throughout the province. Long-lasting cleanup and restoration operations are needed to bring the afflicted communities back to normality after the ice storm.

== See also ==
- Weather of 2023
