= January 1999 North American ice storm =

Weather event in the United States

The January 1999 North American ice storm was a severe ice storm that struck the Washington, D.C. metropolitan area on January 14 and 15, 1999. Heavy ice accumulation brought down power lines, which resulted in around 745,000 people in the area losing power. Many of the major power companies supplying Washington, D.C., Maryland, and Virginia had significant portions of their customer bases impacted. At the height of the storm, around one third of PEPCO's customers were without power, with some waiting up to two weeks for power to be restored.
