= December 2013 North American storm complex =

Weather event in the United States and Canada

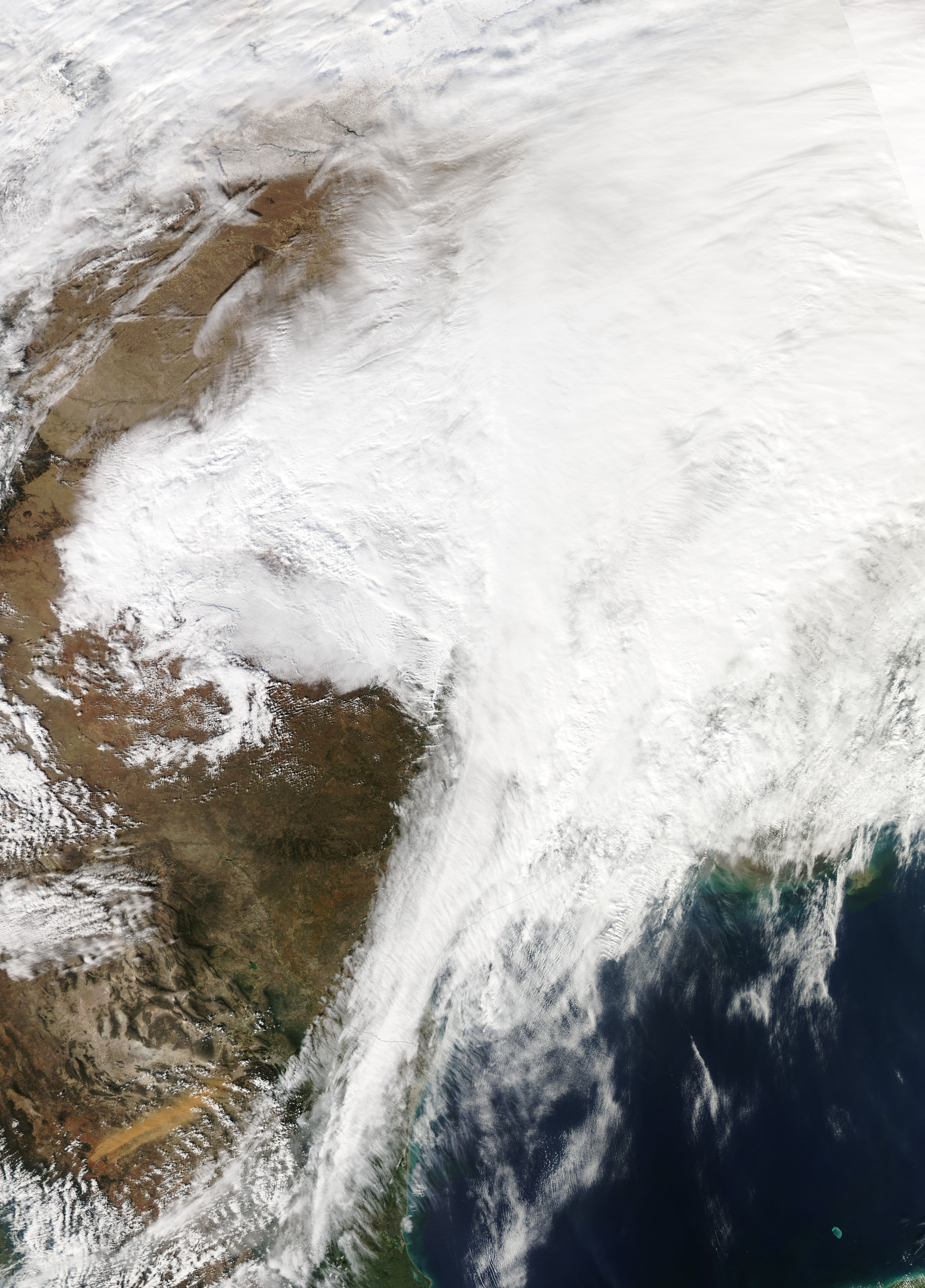
- Satellite image from NASA depicting the system over the Central United States on 21 December.

Meteorological history
- Formed: 19 December 2013
- Dissipated: 23 December 2013

Winter storm
- Lowest pressure: 997 hPa (mbar); 29.44 inHg
- Max. snowfall: Snowfall – ~36 cm (14 in); Ice – Around 30 mm (1.2 in)

Tornado outbreak
- Tornadoes: 13
- Max. rating: EF2 tornado
- Duration: 2 days, 6 hours and 4 minutes

Overall effects
- Fatalities: 29
- Damage: $54 million – $200 million (2013 USD)
- Areas affected: Southern Ontario, Southern Quebec, Upper Midwest, Great Plains, Southeastern United States, East Coast, Michigan, northern New England, Nova Scotia, Canada, Newfoundland,
- Power outages: 1,500,000
- Part of the 2013–14 North American winter and tornado outbreaks of 2013

The December 2013 North American storm complex was a significant storm complex that included many different types of severe weather, including a winter storm, a severe ice storm and a tornado outbreak that impacted the central and eastern portions of Canada, parts of the Central Great Plains, the Southern United States, and the northeastern United States from 20 to 23 December 2013. Formed in the South Central United States, the storm headed across the Great Plains towards Canada into Atlantic Canada and northeastern United States where the storm dissipated on 23 December 2013. The storm produced freezing rain and snow to the affected areas which caused massive damage to electric power transmission and trees. The storm resulted in 29 deaths, loss of power to over a million residents and over $200 million in damages. The storm produced similar conditions to the ice storm of 1998 which affected similar areas.

== Meteorological history ==
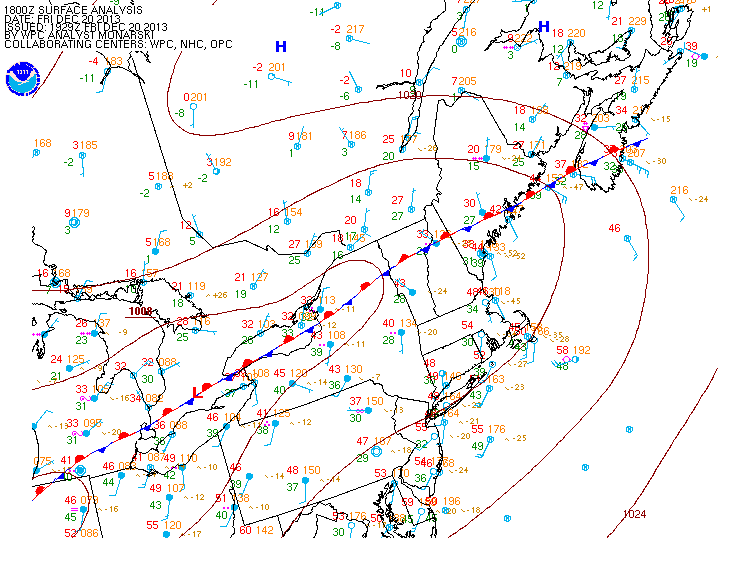
Surface weather map on 20 December at 18 UTC (1 PM local) showing the position of the warm front along which the freezing rain fell

Weather map showing the progression of snow (white/blue) and freezing rain (red)

On 19 December, an area of low pressure that had formed over Texas traveled through the northwestern part of Arkansas, passing through Oklahoma overnight on 19 December, heading towards the Midwestern United States and the Great Plains where lower temperatures forecast ice accumulation. It entered Ontario, Canada, by 2:00 pm on 20 December, when a freezing rain warning was in place. The associated warm front, which ran from Texas, met a cold air mass in eastern Canada, where large amounts of snow fell. Near the front, precipitation was in the form of freezing rain and ice pellets. The front gradually extended toward Atlantic Canada during the night of 20–21 December, affecting extreme Southern Quebec and later the Maritimes. By mid-day on 21 December, an upper-level low had developed in central Texas, and this began to draw moisture from the Gulf of Mexico. While moving to the northeast, the storm dumped heavy snow and ice over parts of the Upper Midwest and Michigan Peninsula through 21 December. One specific part of the storm close to the upper-level low lingered near Kansas and produced snowfall rates of 1–2 inches (2.5–5.1 cm) per hour, before eventually moving northwards and leaving behind snowfall totals of up to 10–14 inches (25–36 cm) in some areas.

On 22 December, the storm brought freezing rain to the state of Maine. The storm caused freezing rain to accumulate on tree branches, causing some to fall off and topple power lines. The storm complex continued to produce ice and snow in the northern parts of New England and Canada, before finally weakening and dissipating late on 23 December.

The storm complex was also responsible for producing a small but damaging tornado outbreak that occurred from 20 to 21 December, most of which occurred on 21 December, due to the fact that supercell thunderstorms were able to pop up, and eventually coalesced into a squall line later the same day along the system's cold front, as it tracked towards the East Coast. It then began to linger over the Southeast before weakening as the initial area of low pressure tracked out of the country.

== Confirmed tornadoes ==
Confirmed tornadoes by Enhanced Fujita rating
EFU	EF0	EF1	EF2	EF3	EF4	EF5	Total
0	3	7	3	0	0	0	13

=== December 20 event ===
List of confirmed tornadoes – Friday, December 20, 2013 (Note: All dates are based on the local time zone where the tornado touched down; however, all times are in Coordinated Universal Time for consistency.)
EF#	Location	County / Parish	State	Coord.	Time (UTC)	Path length	Max width	Summary
EF0	WNW of Reganton	Warren	MS	32.1554°N 90.7746°W	2241 – 2242	0.24 mi (0.39 km)	50 yd (46 m)	Limbs and parts of the trunks of five to eight trees were broken off, with some being scattered across a roadway.
EF0	S of Newman	Hinds	MS	32.205°N 90.705°W	2256 – 2257	0.14 mi (0.23 km)	30 yd (27 m)	A very brief tornado blew a tree down across a road and scattered limbs and tree debris (leaves, twigs, etc.).
EF1	Redfield	Jefferson	AR	34.431°N 92.188°W	0033 – 0035	1.48 mi (2.38 km)	150 yd (140 m)	Several homes sustained roof damage, several sheds were destroyed, a trampoline and a swing set were thrown and wrapped around trees, and numerous trees and power lines were downed.

=== December 21 event ===
List of confirmed tornadoes – Saturday, December 21, 2013
EF#	Location	County / Parish	State	Start Coord.	Time (UTC)	Path length	Max width	Summary
EF1	SW of Woodville	Tyler	TX	30.7418°N 94.4977°W	1958 – 1959	0.87 mi (1.40 km)	25 yd (23 m)	Several large hardwood trees were blown down or snapped; one landed on a parked car.
EF1	N of Town Bluff	Tyler	TX	30.7867°N 94.2042°W	2022 – 2023	1.48 mi (2.38 km)	25 yd (23 m)	Part of the metal roof was ripped off a small rural grocery store and blown into the COE park, damaging several picnic areas. Several trees were downed or snapped.
EF1	WNW of Kirbyville	Jasper	TX	30.6953°N 94.0208°W	2050 – 2051	0.4 mi (0.64 km)	25 yd (23 m)	A fast-moving tornado ripped off a well-built carport/garage attached to a home. Part of the structure landed on the home, but some of the metal debris was thrown for 200 yards (180 m).
EF2	SW of Hughes to NW of Tarsus	St. Francis	AR	34.907°N 90.559°W	2113 – 2129	15.57 mi (25.06 km)	300 yd (270 m)	1 death – Three mobile homes and a metal shed were destroyed, two homes sustained roof damage, a barn was damaged, and irrigation pivots were overturned. Trees and power lines were downed along the path. Three additional people were injured.
EF1	NE of Downsville	Union	LA	32.6405°N 92.3770°W	2143 – 2145	0.76 mi (1.22 km)	75 yd (69 m)	Several trees and a barn were damaged.
EF2	ESE of Dermott, AR to NNE of Cleveland, MS	Chicot (AR), Desha (AR), Bolivar (MS)	AR, MS	33.51°N 91.362°W	2251 – 2328	41 mi (66 km)	440 yd (400 m)	A strong, long-track tornado touched down in Chicot County, snapping power poles and flipping two tractor-trailers. Several homes and farm buildings and the Yellow Bend Port Facility sustained minor to major roof damage before the tornado moved into Desha County east of Halley, where a mobile home was knocked off of its foundation and had its porch torn off. In addition, a large metal intermodal shipping container was thrown into the mobile home, smashing the kitchen area. Elsewhere in Desha County, one house had its porch torn off, roof damage, broken windows, and a hole punched in the wall, while a second house had a large amount of roofing torn off, and a third house had the attached carport torn off and blown onto the roof. Several storage sheds were destroyed, and numerous trees and power lines were downed as well. The tornado briefly moved back into Chicot County before crossing the Mississippi River into Bolivar County, where a well-built tractor shed was destroyed, several farm buildings were damaged, and numerous trees and power poles were downed before the tornado lifted. Two people sustained minor injuries; both occurring in the overturned tractor-trailers in Chicot County.
EF2	Rena Lara to Clarksdale	Coahoma	MS	34.149°N 90.767°W	2319 – 2328	10.07 mi (16.21 km)	300 yd (270 m)	1 death – Four homes suffered minor to significant roof damage, a mobile home was heavily damaged (where the fatality occurred), two large garages were destroyed, and two light poles over the football field at Coahoma County High School were bent and destroyed. An elementary school sustained roof and window damage and numerous trees were downed as well. One additional person was injured.
EF0	S of Wadesboro	Calloway	KY	36.7343°N 88.3178°W	2331 – 2332	0.33 mi (0.53 km)	50 yd (46 m)	Power lines were downed, and a few trees were uprooted.
EF1	SE of Dundee	Tunica	MS	34.4465°N 90.4171°W	2340 – 2344	2.67 mi (4.30 km)	200 yd (180 m)	A tornado just northeast of the Coahoma County line pushed a church at least 10 feet (3.0 m) off of its foundation, damaged multiple homes, and rolled a trailer. Debris was thrown at least 1 mile (1.6 km) from the damaged homes. Numerous trees and power lines were downed as well.
EF1	SW of Senatobia	Panola, Tate	MS	34.519°N 90.094°W	2357 – 0002	6.17 mi (9.93 km)	200 yd (180 m)	Four homes sustained roof damage, the covered porch of a two-story home was lifted and deposited onto the roof of a garage, and several trees were downed.
EF0	NE of Independence	Tate	MS	34.7412°N 89.7413°W	0013 – 0017	0.72 mi (1.16 km)	100 yd (91 m)	Many homes and a church sustained minor roof damage and trees and power lines were downed.
EF1	Campbellsville	Taylor	KY	37.3333°N 85.396°W	0407 – 0413	5.53 mi (8.90 km)	300 yd (270 m)	A tornado touched down west of Campbellsville, destroying small outbuildings before moving through town and to the northeast, where numerous homes sustained roof damage and many trees were downed before the tornado dissipated.
EF1	NNW of Cynthiana	Harrison	KY	38.457°N 84.3829°W	0429 – 0434	3.49 mi (5.62 km)	110 yd (100 m)	Many barns and garages were either damaged or destroyed, several homes and outbuildings had roof and structural damage, and numerous trees and power lines were downed. Debris was blown in all directions from some of the structures.
EF1	NW of Millersburg	Bourbon	KY	38.30°N 84.2477°W	0441 – 0445	5.74 mi (9.24 km)	125 yd (114 m)	Several large barns, garages, and outbuildings were either significantly damaged or destroyed, with debris scattered in all directions, and some well anchored solid footers from a garage and a barn were lifted up and thrown 75 yards (69 m). Trees and power poles were downed as well.

== Preparations ==
Before the storm, meteorologists predicted falls of a mixture of snow, ice pellets and freezing rain from two storm systems from Texas and the Great Lakes. As the predicted possible ice storm was heading towards the northeastern United States, utility workers were preparing for the event. Governor of New York Andrew Cuomo declared a winter ice storm emergency for parts of the state and prepared the emergency operations center. In Toronto, Toronto Hydro executive vice president Ben LaPianta stated, "We knew the storm was coming out of the central U.S., it was a warm air mass and we knew that it was going to collide somewhere in Ontario." Utility workers prepared for the possibility of fallen power lines and officials warned residents to prepare for power outages.

== Impacts ==
In both central Canada and central United States, cryoseisms (frost quakes) formed as a result of this ice storm were heard by a large number of people.

=== Canada ===
==== Ontario ====
Hydro One, an electricity company that serves mostly rural areas of Ontario, reported over 600,000 power outages at the height of the storm. The worst-hit areas were along the shores of the Lake Ontario. In Trenton, just east of the Greater Toronto Area (GTA), there was a reported 3 cm (1.2 in) of ice accumulation on the ground. The ice accumulation across southern and eastern Ontario was severe enough to cause widespread power outages because of fallen trees and branches. There were numerous automobile accidents on Highway 401. The town of Woolwich declared a state of emergency on 22 December after it was determined it would be without power for at least 24 hours. Elsewhere in Ontario, thousands of customers remained without power until well after Christmas Day.

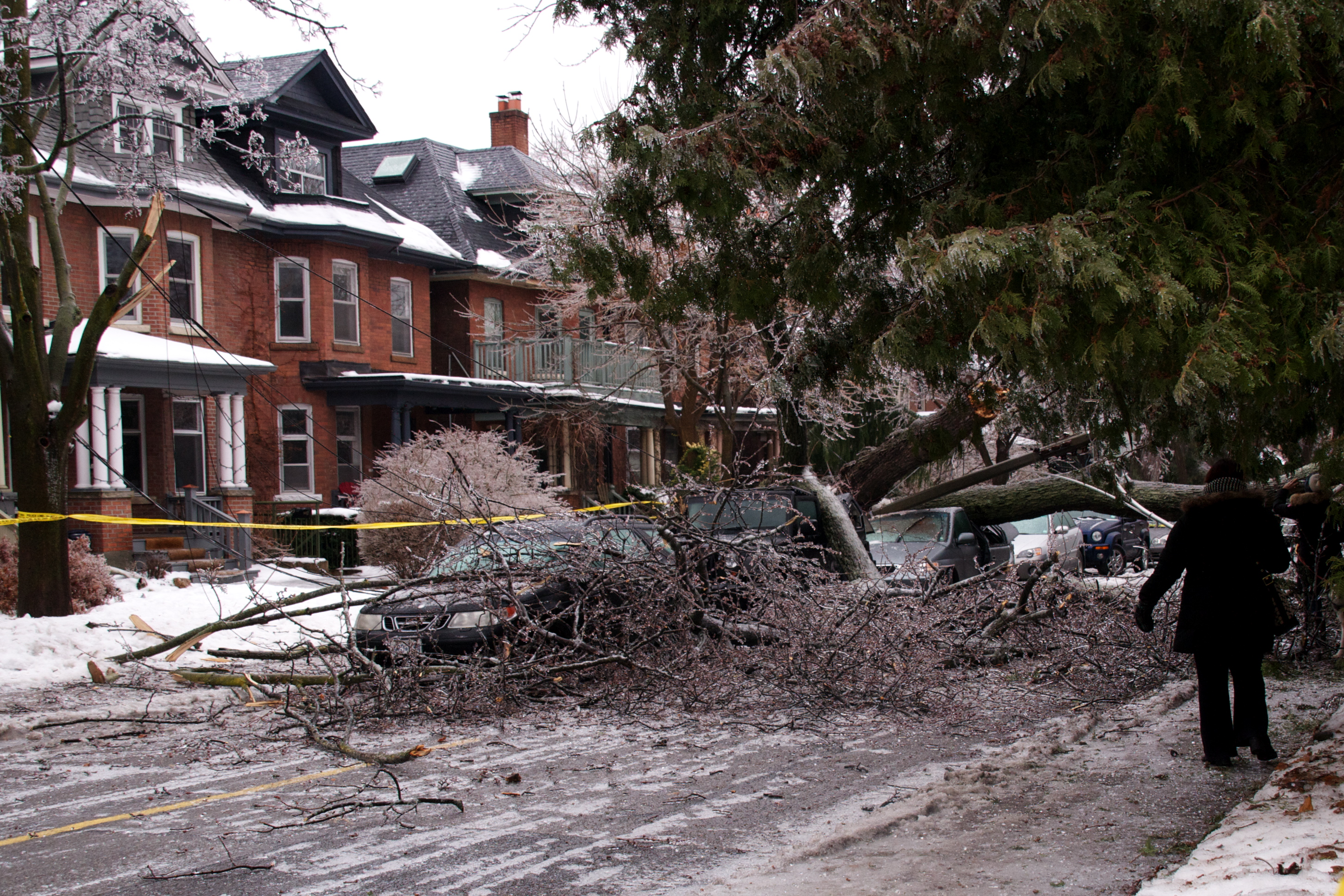
Fallen trees on vehicles in The Annex after the ice storm

Toronto, Canada's largest city, was one of the hardest hit by the ice storm. The first wave of freezing rain began on 20 December; it coated the city in a significant but manageable quantity of ice. The second, more powerful wave of rain struck the city in the early morning of 22 December. Utility poles and tree branches collapsed under the weight of the thick ice accumulation. At the height of the storm over 300,000 Toronto Hydro customers had no electricity or heating. The City of Toronto simultaneously opened and operated 13 community reception centers and 13 Toronto police facility community warming centers, providing temporary sleeping accommodation, food, water, hygiene kits and other resources. The warming centers operated 24 hours a day, offering those without electricity a warm place to sleep and eat until their power was restored. By 24 December, four days after the storm, 69,800 customers throughout the city were still without electricity. Approximately 1,000 people spent Christmas Eve in the warming centers. On 29 December, Hydro One diverted its crews to assist Toronto Hydro to help restore power to over 6,000 people in the city who were still without power. In addition to Hydro One, crews were called in from Ottawa, Windsor and Michigan and Manitoba to help restore power to the city by the New Year. West of Toronto, crews were called in from Goderich, Niagara Region, Tillsonburg, St. Thomas, Essex, Guelph, Haldimand County and Oakville.

In Ottawa, temperatures were low enough to spare the nation's capital the worst of the freezing rain. The city received over 30 cm (12 in) of snow in two days. Slippery conditions on Ottawa's roads resulted in public transit delays of up to 30 minutes. There were also numerous VIA Rail delays on services between Ottawa and Toronto. In some cases, trains were delayed for over two hours because of the accumulation of snow and ice on the tracks. Additional delays were caused by fallen trees obstructing the railway. Approximately 6,000 customers in Ottawa lost electricity supplies at the height of the storm; however, unlike areas to the south, the power outages in Ottawa lasted only a few hours.

On 30 December, Loblaws, Shoppers Drug Mart, Sobeys and Metro donated CA$25,000 in grocery and gift cards, Coppas Fresh Market donated CA$5,000 in grocery cards, and the Ontario Government donated CA$100,000. Residents of Toronto who could not afford to replace food spoiled by the blackout could pick up the cards at Ontario Works offices from 31 December 2013 to 3 January 2014.

On 22 December 2013, the Toronto Transit Commission suspended streetcar services for most of the day because of thick ice on the overhead wires. The Sheppard line also ceased operations until 24 December. On the Yonge–University–Spadina line, trains bypassed North York Centre station because there was no electricity. The entire Scarborough RT line was shut down until 23 December because of the freezing rain. Along the Bloor–Danforth line, shuttle buses ran from Victoria Park to Warden, Kennedy stations and beyond to those on the Scarborough RT line.

==== Quebec ====
The storm affected Quebec, bringing wind gusts measured at 85 km/h (53 mph) and snow accumulations of up to 30 cm (12 in). Accumulations of freezing rain of up to 3 cm (1.2 in) were reported over Montérégie and Eastern Townships regions in the extreme south of the province. It caused six deaths, but none related to the freezing precipitation. More than 50,000 power outages were caused by the accumulation of ice. Hydro-Québec sent more than 500 technicians to help restore power supplies.

==== Atlantic Canada ====
The storm system moved eastwards from Ontario towards the Atlantic provinces, creating delays at major airports in Nova Scotia, Newfoundland and New Brunswick. 53,000 residents in New Brunswick and 12,000 residents in Nova Scotia were without electricity. These provinces were under a freezing rain warning.

=== United States ===
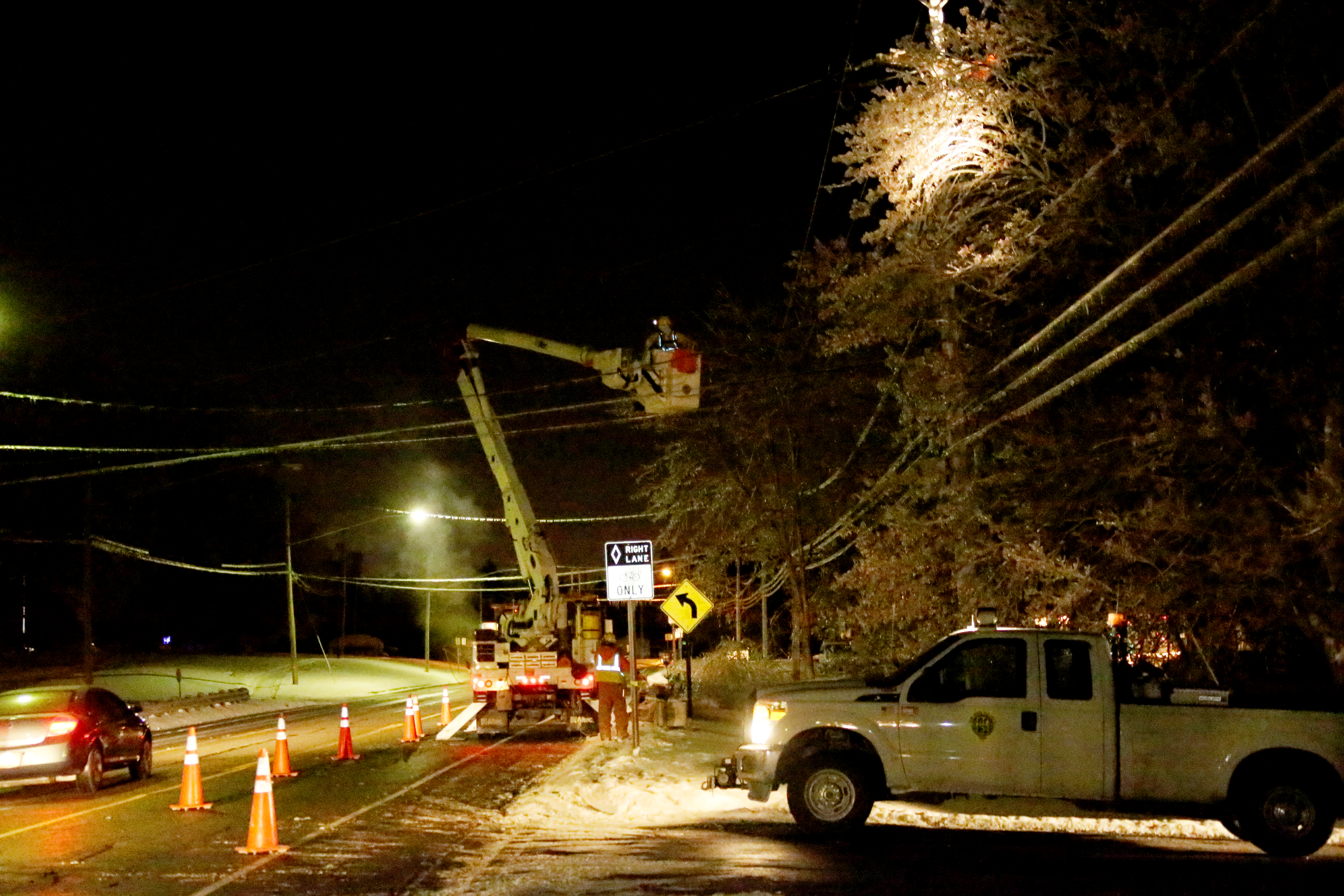
Consumers Energy crew working in Flint, Michigan

Parts of the United States, including the northeastern United States, New York and Michigan were affected by the storm. Red Cross shelters were set up to assist people affected by it. On 21 December 500 flights were delayed in major hub airports across the country. In the midwest several floods were reported following the storm. On 22 December, the storm also brought record warm temperatures to New York City and the tri state area. In Central Park, the temperatures rose to 71 °F (22 °C) which smashed the previous record of 63 °F (17 °C) set in 1998. Temperatures also reached record highs of 67 °F (19 °C) in Philadelphia and Wilmington, Delaware, and Atlantic City, New Jersey also set a record high with a maximum temperature of 68 °F (20 °C).

In the state of Maine, more than 123,000 homes lost power. Central Maine Power (CMP), Maine's largest electricity supplier, brought in 900 line crews to supplement the CMP's 85 line crews to restore supplies. In Michigan, approximately 380,700 homes and businesses across the state were without electricity. Many of the outages were reported in Ingham, Genesee, and Lapeer counties. Consumers Energy stated, "this storm was the largest Christmas-week storm in the company's 126-year history and the worst ice storm in 10 years".

Both Vermont and New York issued states of emergency. In Jefferson County, New York, officials declared a state of emergency after significant damage affected the area. An emergency operations center was set up to monitor the storm damage. In upstate New York, more than 70,000 customers were without electricity; 17,000 National Grid plc customers reported outages. Ice storm preparation was in force in New Hampshire, where utility crews staged vehicles before the storm arrived.

In the state of Maine, hydro service provider Central Maine Power started power recovery efforts to 123,000 customers. On 25 December, 1,800 workers cleared broken branches and fallen trees to restore electricity supplies. On 3 April 2014, the Federal Emergency Management Agency declined a request from governor Paul LePage, in funding disaster support to Maine. In Michigan, the Michigan Department of Environmental Quality allocated an emergency order to allow several counties to send debris from fallen trees to local landfill sites.

==== Central United States ====
In Arkansas, several power lines fell. Heavy ice damaged trees around Ouachita National Forest and Ozark–St. Francis National Forest, in which some collapsed, causing road closures in the area. In the city of Redfield, Arkansas, a tornado damaged property. In the Missouri city of Springfield, more than 800 residents reported power outages. Utility crews from City Water, Light & Power initiated power recovery efforts. In Southwest and Central Oklahoma, many areas received over 0.64 cm (0.25 in) of ice accumulation. Some locations received over 1.3 cm (0.50 in); in some localized areas 1.9 cm (0.75 in) of ice fell. Isolated power outages occurred, multiple trees and tree limbs were broken or pulled down by the weight of the ice.

== Deaths ==
It was reported that 27 deaths were related to the storm.

=== Canada ===
==== Ontario ====
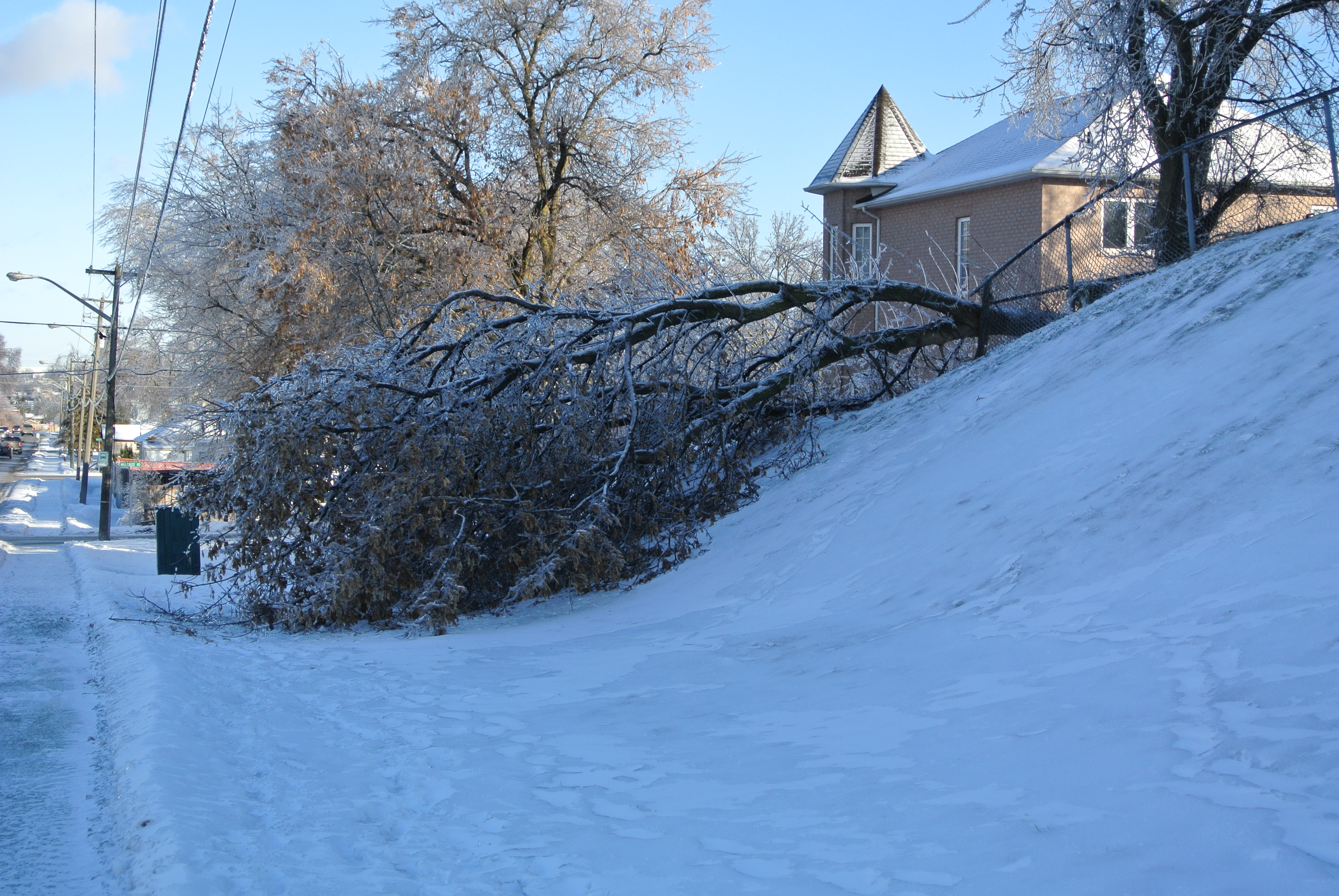
Several fallen trees including this one in Pickering, Ontario were left untouched until officials deemed safe for removal

Following the ice storm, thousands of tree branches littered the streets and sidewalks of Toronto. Some roads had to be closed because they were blocked by large tree limbs. More commonly, tree branches made walking on sidewalks difficult; pedestrians were either forced to navigate through the debris or walk onto busy roads to avoid the large branches. Further snow accumulations a few days after the storm resulted in more broken branches and power lines. The city of Toronto announced that debris clearing operations would begin on 3 January 2014. The operation was expected to take about eight weeks to complete. Clearing streets and sidewalks was prioritized, before attention was shifted to cleaning debris from city parks on 23 January. Residents were told that while the city would pick up debris that fell on private property, homeowners were responsible for ensuring the material was piled at the end of their driveways for municipal employees to collect. However, the city announced it would not take responsibility for large tree limbs that had fallen on private property. Residents were told they would have to hire private contractors to remove the material.

Toronto Hydro reported an estimated cost of CA$12.9 million due to the ice storm, including around $1 million of lost revenue, $10 million spent on labor, and $2 million in materials. CEO Anthony Haines reported that the cost might be passed on to customers in increased electricity charges. Haines told critics who argued that Toronto's power distribution system should be moved underground that the project would cost CA$15 billion. He said this would cause a price hike of about 300 per cent because underground systems cost about seven times as much as overhead systems. He also said underground systems may not solve all the problems associated with weather-related power outages.

Funding of CA$114 million was requested for provincial and federal aid by the Toronto City Council. It was estimated that damage to the city of Brampton cost $51 million; in Mississauga it was $25 million. Several Manitoba Hydro utility workers assisted in the recovery efforts.

==== Quebec ====
In Quebec on 22 December, Hydro-Quebec reported 9,500 clients were affected by power outages from the storm. Five days later, 4,000 were without power, most of whom were in the Eastern Townships of Quebec. By 29 December, the reports had decreased to below 400.

==== Atlantic Canada ====
Following the ice storm, it was reported that half of the residents of Saint John, New Brunswick were without power. NB Power reported that recovery efforts were underway but would be slow. On 27 December, NB Power restored electricity to 13,000 customers. 3,200 NB Power customers were still without power on 29 December. In Nova Scotia, crews responded to the outages. 2,000 reports were completed by 24 December.

== See also ==
- 2013–14 North American winter
- Early 2014 North American cold wave
- January 1998 North American ice storm
- Late December 2012 North American storm complex
- December 2015 North American storm complex
- November 2015 United States ice storm
- Mid-January 2017 North American ice storm
