= January 2007 North American ice storm =

January 2007 storm in North America

Meteorological history
- Formed: January 11, 2007
- Dissipated: January 24, 2007

Category 2 "Minor" winter storm
- Regional snowfall index: 3.05 (NOAA)
- Lowest pressure: 961
- Max. snowfall: 4 inches (10 cm) of ice (Oklahoma, Missouri), 32 inches (81 cm) of snow (Gaspe Peninsula)

Overall effects
- Fatalities: 85+ total
- Damage: $380 million
- Areas affected: Eastern, Central United States, and Eastern Canada
- Part of the Winter storms of 2006–07

The January 2007 North American ice storm was a severe ice storm that affected a large swath of North America from the Rio Grande Valley to New England and southeastern Canada, starting on January 11 and lasting until January 16. It was followed by a second wave in the Southern United States from Texas to the Carolinas from January 16 through January 18, and a third one that hit the southern Plains and mid-Atlantic states as well as Newfoundland and Labrador from January 19 to January 24. It resulted in at least 74 deaths across 12 U.S. states and three Canadian provinces, and caused hundreds of thousands of residents across the U.S. and Canada to lose electric power.

The event was similar to the 1998 Ice storm that struck portions of eastern Canada and northern New England, which were affected by multiple waves of ice precipitation over a period of five days.

== Prior to the storm ==
Before the storm, most of North America experienced very mild conditions through the first week and a half of January, with several record-breaking warm temperatures across most of the Midwest and Eastern U.S. and Canada. Several regions had recorded warmer than normal temperatures for over 30 days in a row. On January 8, a cold front, which was responsible for a major blizzard across Alberta, Saskatchewan and Manitoba, sagged across most of the continent, bringing with it much colder temperatures. A deep trough in the jet stream favored a more active weather pattern and waves of low pressure started to develop over the Gulf of Mexico starting on January 17.

== Storm track ==
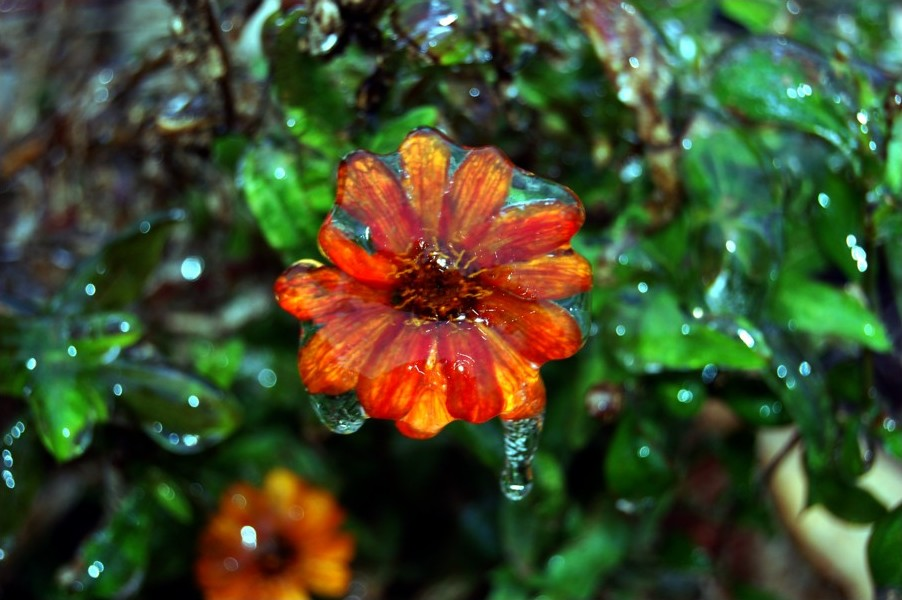
Image of a flower covered in ice after a winter storm closed the main highways in San Antonio, Texas in January 2007.

The main storm developed in the Southwest of the U.S. and quickly expanded over the Deep South near the Gulf of Mexico. Frozen precipitation spread across a wide region, from northern Texas north and east to the New England States as arctic air sank southward with overriding warm air from the Gulf of Mexico. Ice storm warnings were in effect for northwestern Arkansas, central Illinois, extreme southeastern Kansas, a large part of Missouri, central and eastern Oklahoma, northern and central Texas as well as portions of Michigan, Indiana and Ontario. Several waves of precipitation crossed those states from the 12th to the 16th, including the main event on the 14th.

The main storm moved northeastward, affecting the Great Lakes region, New England and the Canadian Maritimes from January 14 to January 16. With the exception of southern Ontario and Nova Scotia, most of the precipitation in Canada fell in the form of snow. The storm departed Newfoundland and Labrador later on January 16.

Meanwhile, another wave developed near the U.S.–Mexico border and tracked east across southeastern Texas towards the Carolinas January 16 to January 18. It brought a wintry mix, including a heavy snowstorm, to eastern Canada and Maine on the 19th. In the Gulf of Mexico, high wind speeds.

A second winter storm developed in Texas and brought another round of heavy wintry precipitation from Arizona into the Great Lakes region. The large storm also affected the Midwest and some of the mid-Atlantic states before moving into the Atlantic Ocean and hitting Newfoundland and Labrador on January 24 before heading towards the Arctic region.

== Impact ==
=== Oklahoma ===
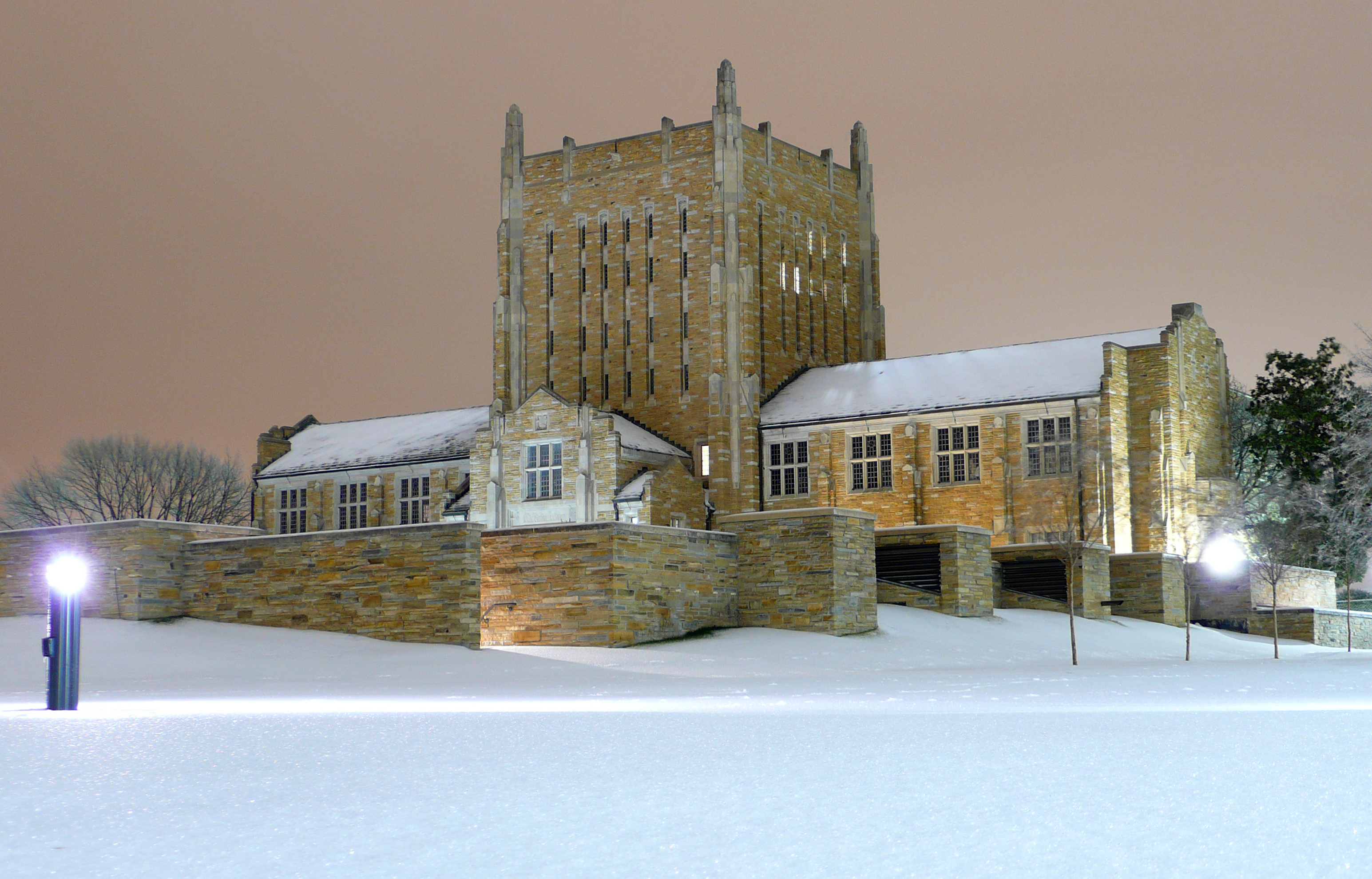
The University of Tulsa campus on the night of January 14

Governor of Oklahoma Brad Henry declared a state of emergency for the entire state due to the ice storm. U.S. President George W. Bush later declared Oklahoma a federal disaster area.

In Oklahoma, in addition to major tree damage, about 40,000 customers lost power after the first wave of freezing rain on January 12. After additional waves of ice and sleet, 120,000 customers were without power (60,000 of them for over a week). One of the hardest hit areas was the city of McAlester in the eastern part of the state in Pittsburg County, where most of the town was without power for several days. Thousands of residents sought refuges set up by the American Red Cross with 1,000 still remaining as of January 20th.

For the first time in the history of the Big 12 Conference, a conference basketball game was postponed when the Oklahoma State men's team was not able to fly out of either Stillwater or Oklahoma City to make its January 13 game at Nebraska. The game was rescheduled to March 5. For the second time this season, an NBA game was postponed due to severe winter weather. The New Orleans/Oklahoma City Hornets, scheduled to play the Milwaukee Bucks in Milwaukee on January 13, were unable to catch a flight out of Oklahoma City. The following day, a second Big 12 basketball game, this time a women's game between Oklahoma and Texas Tech, was postponed when the Lady Raiders were not able to get to Norman. This game was rescheduled to January 22.

In Oklahoma City on January 14, there was a 3-hour period of thundersleet between 8:45 am and 11:36 am with temperatures in the low to mid 20s.

Damage in the state totaled about $38 million (2007 USD).

=== Missouri and Illinois ===
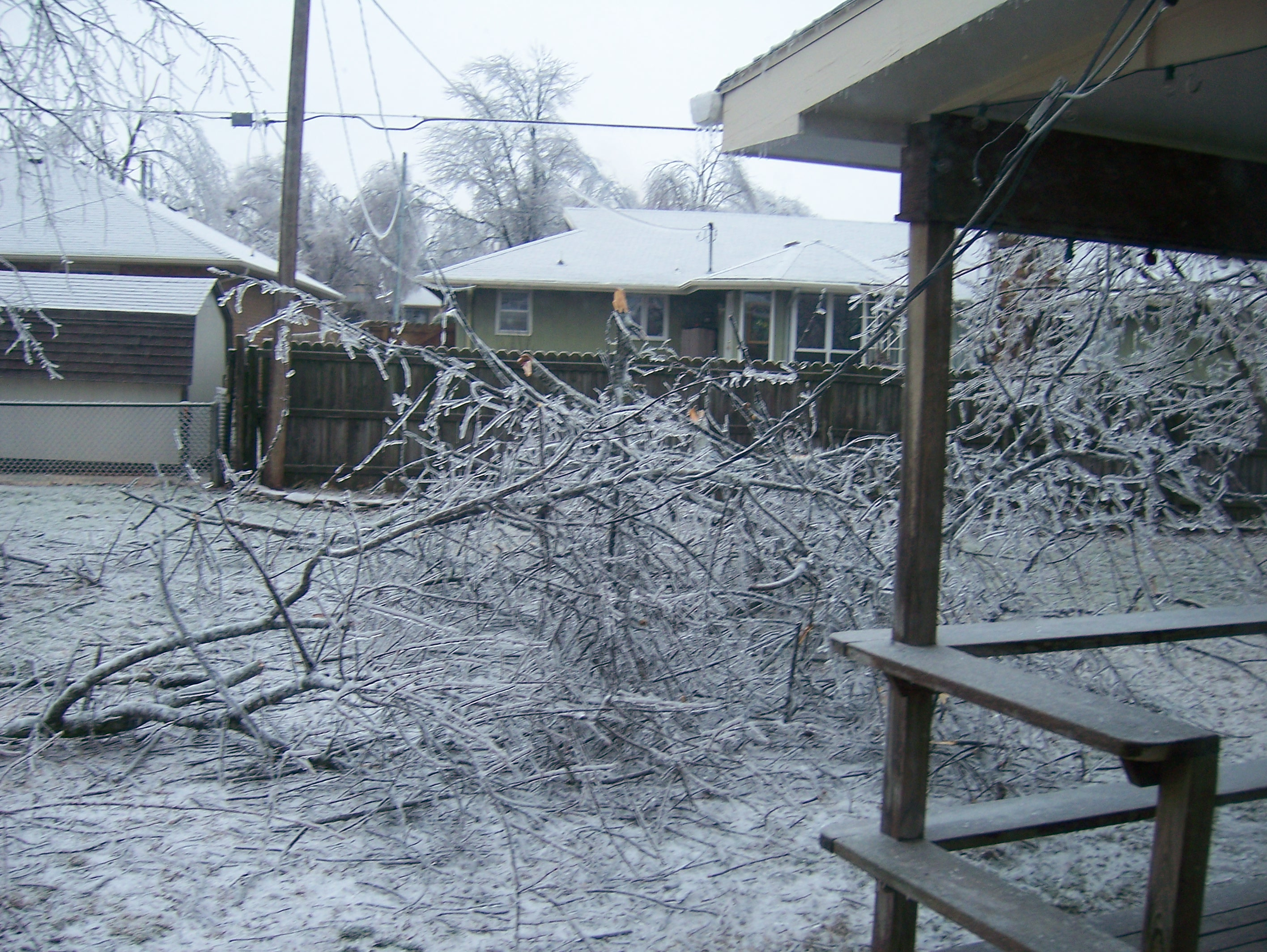
Fallen branches in Springfield, Missouri due to ice build up. Note downed power line.

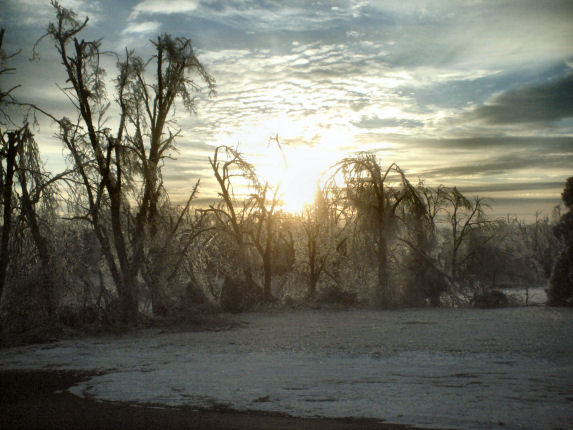
Damage done to trees by the dual ice storms in Rural Bolivar Missouri.

The Governor of Missouri, Matt Blunt, declared a state of emergency and called in the National Guard. In southwestern Missouri, a local disaster area was declared.

At the peak of the storm, a total of 330,000 customers of Ameren were without power. In Springfield, Missouri alone, about 70,000 were in the dark (with rural areas almost completely without power) with the worst still to come, while in east Missouri and central Illinois, over 110,000 customers were without power, particularly around St. Louis. Some restoration took place that afternoon before the next round of freezing rain developed. Extensive damage to trees and power lines has been reported in Missouri. Amtrak service was also shut down across Missouri due to downed trees. The White House declared 34 counties including St. Louis disaster areas. Damage in Missouri totaled $352.9 million (2007 USD).

Nearly 3,600 residents across the state sought refuge at 85 different shelters.

=== Texas ===
Most of the state endured several waves of precipitation. Precipitation fell from the Panhandle region near Amarillo to the Dallas and Fort Worth area on January 13. Areas further south such as Austin, Waco and Houston were affected from January 14 to January 16.

In Texas, Governor Rick Perry's inauguration parade and Martin Luther King, Jr. Day festivities were cancelled while over 400 flights from Dallas/Fort Worth International Airport were cancelled on the 14th with several hundred additional trips cancelled during the following days. Several flights were also cancelled at Austin-Bergstrom International Airport as well as at San Antonio International Airport. A large section of Interstate 10 near the San Antonio area had to be shut down on the 16th because of snow and ice covering the highway. Several schools, universities and offices were shut down as well.

Power outages in the state were limited. Forty four hundred customers were without power in North Texas on January 15. Another 4,500 homes were blacked out in central Texas near the San Antonio area. Over 35,000 were left without power in the state's capital of Austin between January 12 and 18.

Ninety National Guard members were mobilized prior to the second major storm on January 19 and 20.

=== The Carolinas ===
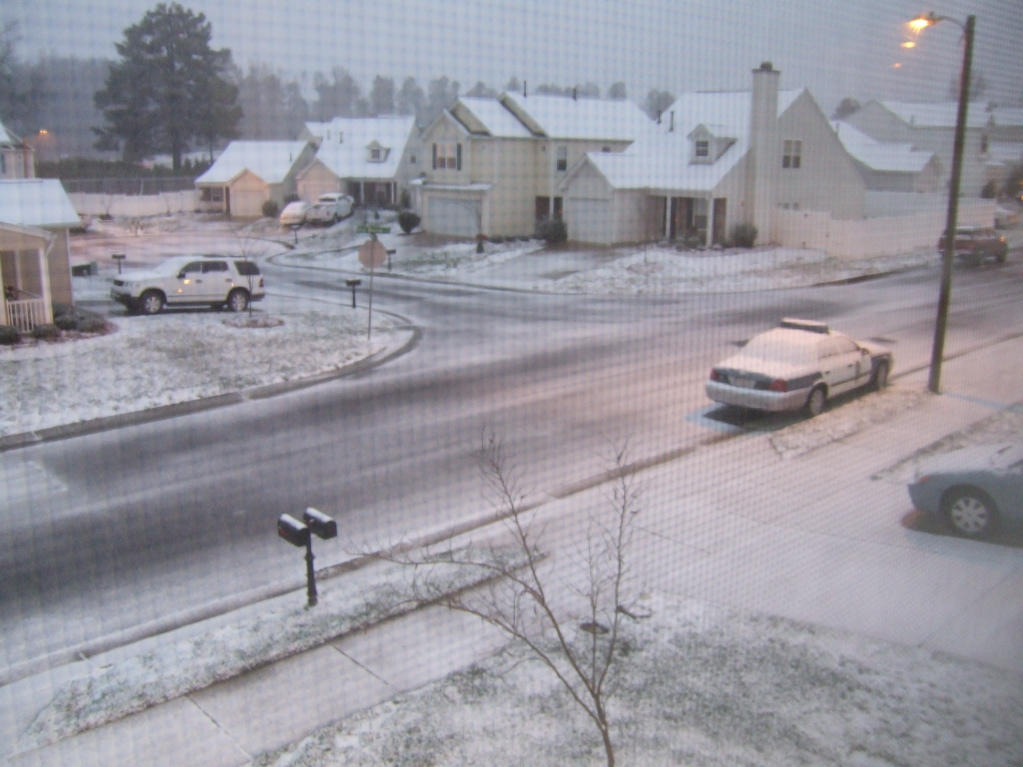
Snow in a suburb of Raleigh, North Carolina

Freezing rain hit the Carolinas on the 17th and 18th, leading to school closures in both states, including in the Charlotte and Raleigh-Durham regions, as well as the Columbia, South Carolina, area. Several flights from Raleigh-Durham and Charlotte international airports were canceled, and police in North Carolina reported over 600 traffic accidents, including two fatal ones and two accidents involving school buses.

=== Kansas and Colorado ===
On December 11, 2007, at least 4 people died in a storm in at least 2 states after a winter storm rolled through the Southern Plains, mainly hitting Kansas, but also some of the other states in the southern Midwest.

The storm also hit Colorado, which was previously hit with several blizzard events in December. It shut down parts of Interstate 70 between Denver and Kansas City. Power was lost due to blowing snow and whiteout conditions.

=== Wisconsin ===
On January 21, a Northwest Airlines plane linking Milwaukee to Detroit via Flight 1726 slipped off a snow-filled runway after a mechanical failure during the storm. No injuries were reported in the incident, which took place shortly after takeoff from General Mitchell International Airport in Milwaukee. The New Orleans Hornets (who played in Oklahoma City at the time) and Milwaukee Bucks game was postponed due to the ice storm in Wisconsin.

=== Canada, Michigan and New England ===
200,000 homes in Michigan were at one point without power, while 145,000 in New York and New Hampshire also lost electricity. About 20,000 Hydro One customers in Ontario, especially near the Lake Erie shoreline, were without power, along with many more homes across the province. GO Train service in Toronto as well as flights from Pearson International Airport were heavily affected on the 15th. Ontario Provincial Police reported nearly 500 traffic accidents in the region, including one involving a tractor trailer carrying liquid oxygen that slid on its side after a collision in the interchange of Highways 400 and 407. Another accident near Drummondville involving a bus injured 24 American students, who were in Quebec on a ski tour.

Heavy snows and mixed precipitation in Atlantic Canada and eastern Quebec caused by a weather bomb disrupted travel on the 19th. The Confederation Bridge linking New Brunswick to Prince Edward Island had to be shut down to truck traffic for several hours due to strong winds and mixed precipitation. Many schools in New Brunswick including the Fredericton and Moncton areas were closed. Local power outages were reported. Several roads in the Quebec regions of Gaspésie and Côte-Nord including Routes 132, 138, and 195 have been completely shut down due to heavy amount of snow and blowing snow. Schools were also closed in Newfoundland and Labrador due to blizzard conditions on the 24th.

=== Death toll ===
At least 87 people were killed, most of them in traffic accidents, by the series of winter storms; fourteen in Missouri, eight in Iowa, twelve in Texas, two in Minnesota, four in New York, one in Maine, one in Indiana, four in Michigan, three in Arkansas, one in Quebec, one in Ontario, one in Nova Scotia, two in North Carolina, three in Kansas, four in Nebraska and twenty-six in Oklahoma. An accident near Elk City, Oklahoma, killed seven occupants who were inside a minivan when it hit a tractor-trailer during the storm.

== Precipitation received ==
About 2 inches (5 cm) of ice and sleet were reported from Texas to Illinois after 3 rounds of freezing rain with locally heavier amounts especially in Missouri and Oklahoma where there were reports of amounts exceeding 4 inches (10 cm).

Heavy amounts of ice were also reported across portions of Lower Michigan, in southern Ontario from Windsor to Toronto and in New York and New Hampshire.

Heavy snows also fell across the northwestern quadrant of the storm. Heavy snows fell in parts of Nebraska and Colorado on the 13th and 14th, with more eastern areas such as Iowa, Wisconsin, Michigan, Maine, Ontario, Quebec and New Brunswick being on the 15th and 16th. Montreal and Sherbrooke received just over 8 inches (200 mm) of snow. Portions of Maine received as much as 10 inches (250 mm).

Near blizzard conditions were reported in Atlantic Canada and eastern Quebec on the 19th. In the Gaspésie region of Quebec, as much as 32 inches (810 mm) of snow fell. There were others reports of snowfall of between 8 and 18 inches (20–45 cm) across Atlantic Canada. Damaging winds in excess of 60 mph (100 km/h) were also reported along with blowing snow. Maine also received up to 10 additional inches (25 cm) of snow from this wave of precipitation.

Between 4 and 10 inches (10–25 cm) of snow fell across the central and southern Plains from the 19th to the 21st as the result of another large winter storm. Places such as Phoenix and Tucson in Arizona also received a rare light snowfall on the 21st while a foot of snow was reported in the mountains in the northern part of the state.

About 10 inches of snow was reported in parts of Newfoundland and Labrador on the 24th, while mixed wintry precipitation was reported in the capital St. John's along with winds in excess of 65 mph (105 km/h).

== Cold spell ==
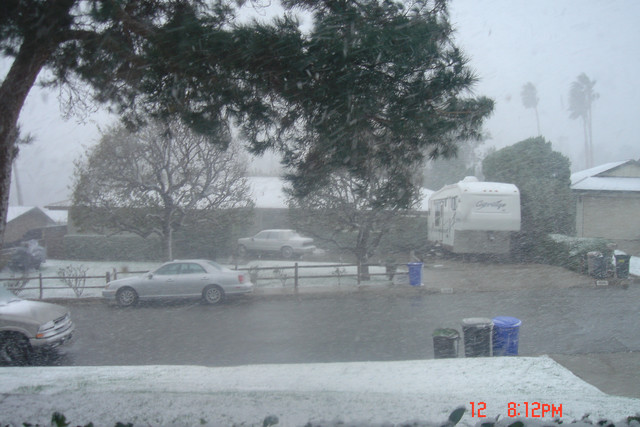
Heavy snowfall in San Bernardino

The first large winter storm was followed by a period of intense cold across most of the continent with some of the coldest temperatures recorded so far in 2006–07 winter season through most of the continent. Deep cold was reported from California to Nova Scotia. Mount Washington, New Hampshire's highest peak at 6,288' (1917m), recorded a windchill of −85 °F (−65 °C) early on 17 January.

Due to the cold spell's effect, a large portion of California's orange crops were damaged.

== See also ==
- Global storm activity of 2007
- January 2017 North American ice storm
- Kyrill (storm)
