= January 1998 North American ice storm =

Major ice storm that affected Eastern Canada and northeastern US in 1998

Coordinates: 45.11°N 73.67°W

Ice Storm of 1998
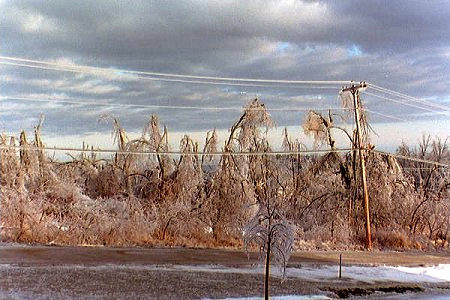
- An example of the damage to trees

Meteorological history
- Formed: January 4, 1998
- Dissipated: January 10, 1998

Blizzard
- Max. snowfall: around 5 inches (130 mm) (freezing rain)

Overall effects
- Fatalities: Canada: 28; United States: 16 (plus 12 in floods in Southern States with same system)
- Damage: $5–7 billion (2005 USD)
- Areas affected: Eastern Ontario including Ottawa; Southern Quebec including Montreal; New Brunswick; Nova Scotia; Northern New York; Vermont; New Hampshire; Maine (lesser effects in Central New York, western Ontario, and southern New England; rain/flooding in the northern Appalachian Mountains)
- Power outages: 4 million at peak

The North American Ice Storm of 1998 (also known as the Great Ice Storm of 1998 or the January Ice Storm) was a massive combination of five smaller successive ice storms in January 1998 that struck a relatively narrow swath of land from eastern Ontario to southern Quebec, New Brunswick and Nova Scotia in Canada, and bordering areas from northern New York to central Maine in the United States. It caused massive damage to trees and electrical infrastructure throughout the area, leading to widespread long-term power outages. Millions were left in the dark for periods varying from days to several weeks, and in some instances, months. It led to 34 fatalities, a shutdown of activities in large cities like Montreal and Ottawa, and an unprecedented effort in reconstruction of the power grid. The ice storm led to the largest deployment of Canadian military personnel since the Korean War, with over 16,000 Canadian Forces personnel deployed, 12,000 in Quebec and 4,000 in Ontario at the height of the crisis.

== Background ==
Freezing rain is common in the eastern half of Canada and New England, generally occurring at the narrow boundary between cold air from the east and north and moist air from the south. Typically, a warm air mass will travel northward along the Mississippi Valley and overrun a shallow layer of cold air trapped at the surface. Such a favorable cold air damming happens with an east to northeasterly flow in the St. Lawrence (the predominant wind direction in the St. Lawrence Valley is usually either northeast or southwest) and the Ottawa Valley and along the axis of the Appalachian Mountains.

Snow is produced at upper levels in such a winter storm system, but it eventually melts into rain as it falls through a warm air layer of above-freezing temperature (of at least 1,200 feet (370 m) in-depth) associated with the overrunning. The rain passes through colder air near the surface and is supercooled. When that rain touches the ground or any other cold surface in the cold air below, the droplets freeze on contact, creating accumulations of ice. If the cold air layer is too thick, the droplets refreeze before hitting the ground and form ice pellets, which are usually less hazardous.

The Montreal area typically receives freezing rain between 12 and 17 times a year, averaging between 45 and 65 total hours of rain. However, a freezing rain storm usually lasts only a few hours and leaves a few millimeters of accumulation. It renders roads and sidewalks slippery, causing minor traffic collisions, but road crews use de-icing material to take care of it. Power lines and other equipment are built according to tough standards, since large accumulation events have happened many times prior to 1998. In Quebec, standards were reinforced after a storm left 30 millimetres (1.2 in) to 40 millimetres (1.6 in) of ice in Montreal in 1961.

Prior to the 1998 storm, the last major ice storm to hit Montreal (1961) deposited around 30 to 60 millimetres (1.2 to 2.4 in) of ice. However, the 1998 storm left deposits twice as thick, downing power lines all over the region, damaging most of the trees in Montreal, and leaving streets covered in a thick, impassable layer of ice.

== Meteorological synopsis ==
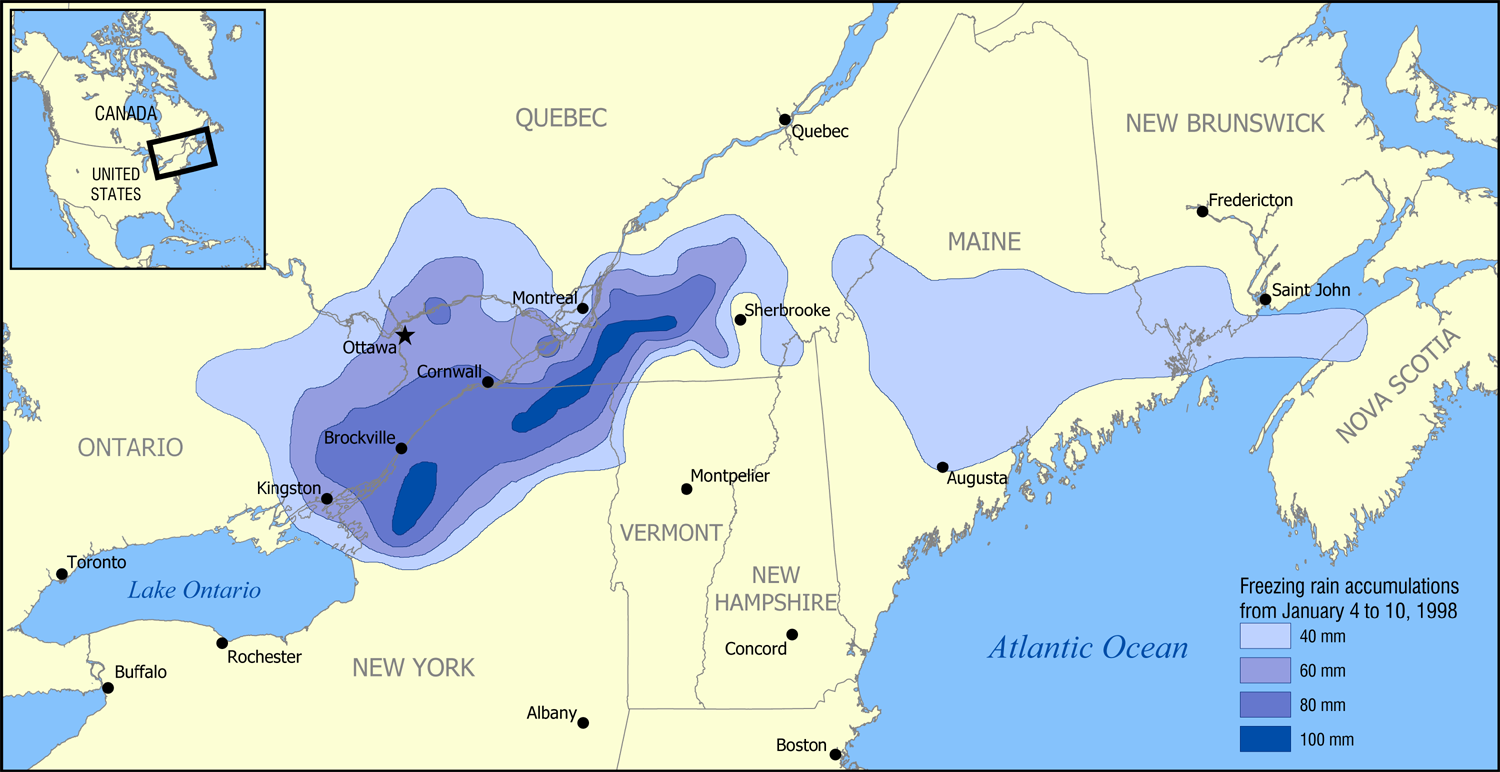
The ice storm affected a large part of eastern Ontario, southwest Quebec, and New York state. This map shows the accumulation of freezing rain in those areas.

On January 4, 1998, an upper level low system stalled over the Great Lakes, pumping warm and moist air from the Gulf of Mexico toward the upper St. Lawrence Valley. The upper flow then turned eastward, bringing this air mass down toward the Bay of Fundy. At the same time, a high pressure center was sitting farther north in Labrador, keeping an easterly flow of very cold air near the surface. An unusually strong Bermuda high pressure area was anchored over the Atlantic Ocean, which prevented these systems from moving further to the east, as most winter storms do when they pass over the Great Lakes–St. Lawrence region.

A series of surface low pressure systems passed in this atmospheric circulation between January 5 and January 10, 1998. For more than 80 hours, steady freezing rain and drizzle fell over an area of several thousand square miles of Eastern Ontario, including Ottawa, Brockville, and Kingston, an extensive area in southern Quebec, northern New York, and northern New England (including parts of Vermont, New Hampshire and Maine).

Farther to the south, southern Ontario and western New York, as well as much of the Appalachian region from Tennessee northward, received heavy rain and severe flooding, while further east, the Canadian Maritimes mostly received heavy snow. Exacerbating the problem was a steep drop in temperature that immediately followed the passage of the freezing rain, which combined with the extreme power outages led to numerous indirect deaths due to carbon monoxide poisoning from generators and other sources as people desperately tried to remain warm.

== Impact ==
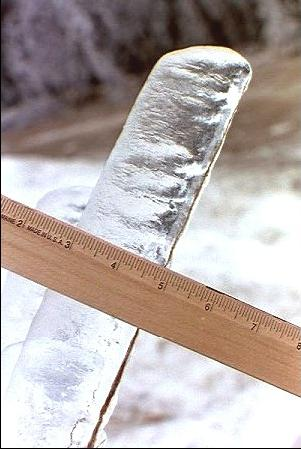
Two inches (50 mm) of ice on a twig, illustrating the impact.

Many power lines broke and over 1,000 transmission towers collapsed in chain reactions under the weight of the ice, leaving more than 4 million people without electricity, most of them in southern Quebec, western New Brunswick and Eastern Ontario, some of them for an entire month. At least twenty-five people died in the areas affected by the ice, primarily from hypothermia, according to Environment Canada. Twelve more deaths and hundreds of millions of dollars in additional damage were caused by the flooding farther south from the same storm system.

The bridges and tunnels linking Montreal with the South Shore were closed because of concerns about weight tolerances or ice chunks falling from the superstructures. All but one power linkage to the island of Montreal were down for several days, disabling both of the city's water pumping stations. When power was restored, parts of Montreal remained impassable due to large chunks of ice falling from rooftops, which endangered pedestrians and motorists; large portions of Old Montreal and the downtown core were cordoned off by police due to the dangers of large sheets of ice falling from buildings.

The area south of Montreal (Montérégie) was so affected that the triangle formed by Saint-Hyacinthe, Granby and Saint-Jean-sur-Richelieu was nicknamed the triangle noir ("dark or black triangle") by the French-language media, and the Triangle of Darkness in English media, for the total lack of electricity for weeks.

Cities such as Ottawa, Smiths Falls, and other Eastern Ontario municipalities that had never experienced such an amount of freezing rain declared a state of emergency. On January 7, Ontario, Quebec, and New Brunswick called on the help of the Canadian Forces, prompting the deployment of more than 15,000 military personnel at the peak of the crisis. In addition, to help residents, CN locomotives (CN3502 and CN3555) were moved off the tracks and used to provide power to residents of Boucherville and Coteau-du-Lac, south and west of Montreal respectively. A third locomotive was moved to Boucherville, but never actually put to use.

The loss of electrical power also greatly affected pig and cattle farmers, as they could no longer provide water or adequate ventilation to their barns full of livestock, leading to the death of many animals. Many barns also collapsed under the weight of the ice, killing the animals trapped inside.

Millions of trees were brought down by the weight of ice around the affected areas. With many trees damaged or felled by the heavy ice, the maple syrup and orchard regions suffered heavy blows and massive losses in the storm; Quebec's maple sugar industry, the largest in the world, was devastated. As another example, 5,000 trees in Montreal's Mount Royal Park had to be cut; 80% (140,000) of the rest were damaged to different degrees and had to be trimmed, a large number severely.

Critically, about 1,000 steel electrical pylons and 35,000 wooden utility poles were pulled over by the weight of the ice, further damaging the power supply and hampering the return of electricity. Teams were brought in from places such as Prince Edward Island and Nova Scotia, along with teams from the United States and the Canadian Forces, to help restore power to affected homes in eastern Ontario and western Quebec.

Roughly 700,000 of Maine's 1.2 million residents were without electricity, the Maine National Guard was mobilized, and hundreds of utility crews from as far away as North Carolina arrived to help. With 8 deaths, this became the deadliest natural disaster in Maine history.

Three weeks after the end of the ice storm, there were still thousands of people without electricity. In Quebec alone, 150,000 people were without electricity as of January 28. Estimates of material damage reached around $2 billion Canadian for Quebec alone. Overall estimates are around $4–6 billion US$ for all the areas affected. Damage to the power grid was so severe that major rebuilding, rather than repairing, of the electrical grid had to be undertaken.

== Operation Recuperation ==
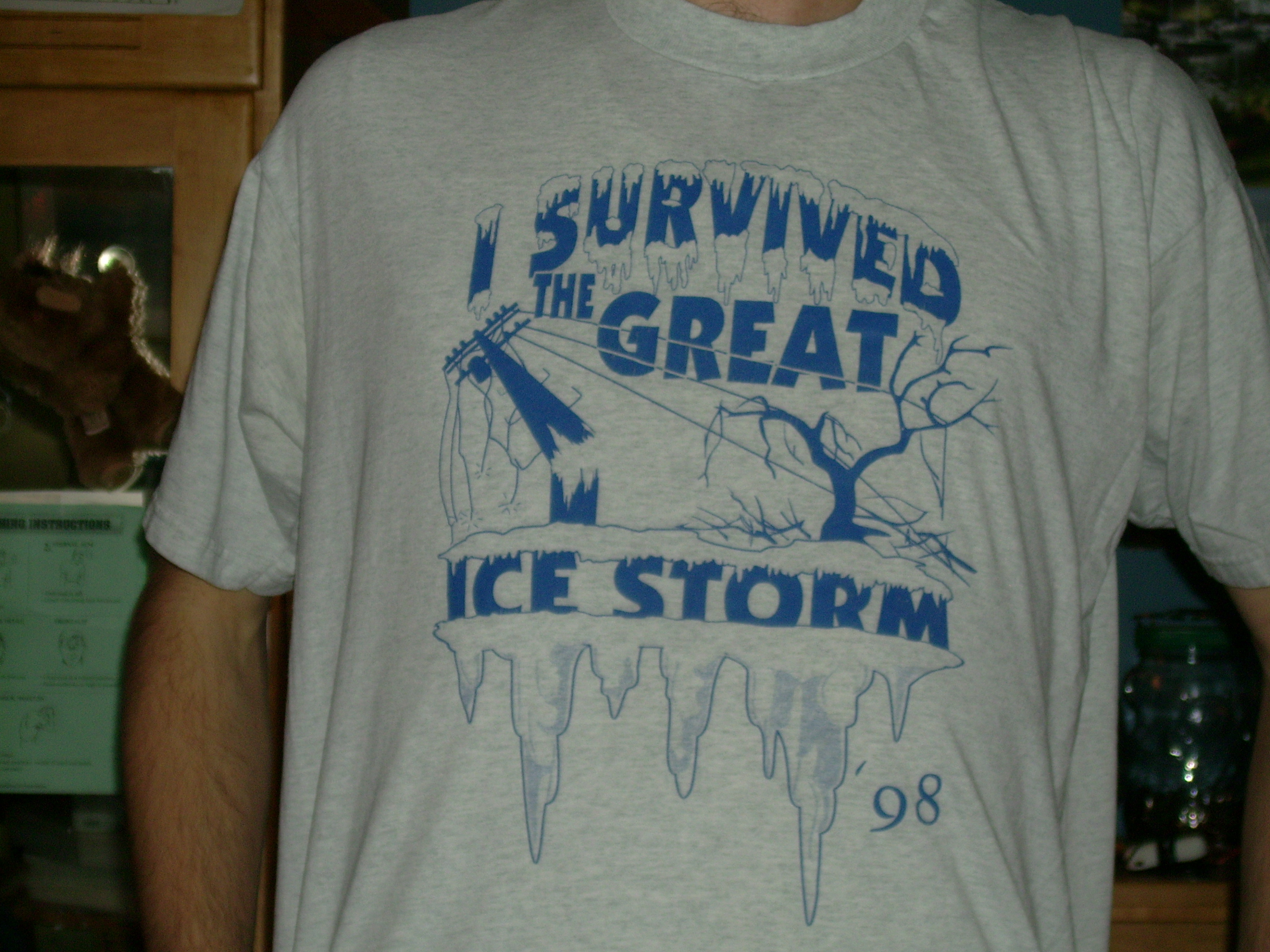
A T-shirt sold in Ottawa, Ontario, a region affected by the 1998 North American Ice Storm

With many roads impassable due to heavy snowfall or fallen trees, broken power lines and coated with a heavy layer of ice, emergency vehicles could hardly move. On January 7, the provinces of New Brunswick, Ontario, and Quebec requested aid from the Canadian Forces (CF), and Operation Recuperation began on January 8. Over 15,000 troops were deployed. It was the largest deployment of troops ever to serve on Canadian soil in response to a natural disaster since the Manitoba floods in 1997, where 14,000 troops were deployed, and the largest operational deployment of Canadian military personnel since the Korean War.

CF members from about 200 units across Canada helped provincial and municipal workers clear roads, rescue people and animals trapped by storm wreckage, evacuate the sick, shelter and feed about 100,000 people frozen out of their homes, and ensure that farmers had the generators and fuel required to keep their operations going. CP-140 aircraft from 14 Wing Greenwood, NS, conducted aerial imagery of the downed power lines in Quebec and Ontario. Military engineers and technicians worked around the clock with hydro and telephone crews to repair and replace downed transmission towers and utility poles. On January 13, at the request of the Province of Quebec, CF members assumed the powers of peace officers in the most devastated areas around Montreal.

At the height of this crisis, Operation Recuperation involved 15,784 deployed personnel (including 3,740 Reservists) from all three CF commands: 10,550 in Quebec, 4,850 in Ontario and 384 in New Brunswick. In addition, 6,200 CF members and DND employees working at their regular jobs provided the logistical support required to sustain the operation.

== Long-term effects ==
Project Ice Storm (Projet Verglas) was created to monitor the long-term effect of prenatal stress. Researchers at McGill University set up the project in the immediate aftermath of the disaster, finding 178 families to participate; some of the women were still pregnant at the start of the investigation. "The goal of the current study is to understand the long-term effects of the prenatal exposure to stress on the physical growth and functioning, cognitive development, and behaviour of the Project Ice Storm children by studying developmental trajectories through age 13.

== See also ==
- 2013–14 North American cold wave
- 2020-21 North American winter
- 2021 Texas power crisis
- 2023 Canada ice storm
- Blizzard of 1977
- December 2005 North American ice storm
- December 2013 North American storm complex
- January 2007 North American ice storm
- February 2021 North American cold wave
- North American blizzard of 1996
- November 2014 North American cold wave
