= 2002 Central Plains ice storm =

Midwest US winter storm

Meteorological history
- Formed: January 29, 2002
- Dissipated: January 31, 2002

Category 2 "Minor" winter storm
- Regional snowfall index: 4.02 (NOAA)
- Max. snowfall: 3 inches

Overall effects
- Fatalities: At least 1
- Damage: $111 million
- Areas affected: Kansas, Missouri, Oklahoma.
- Power outages: 650,000 at peak

The 2002 Central Plains ice storm was a major winter storm that affected the Midwestern United States, causing significant damage across the region, especially in the Kansas City Metropolitan Area.

== Meteorological history ==
An Arctic front moved slowly southward into the Central Plains from January 29 to January 30, resulting in a shallow layer of cold air near the surface. Meanwhile, a strong southwesterly jet stream began transporting a large surge of moist air with connections to the tropical Pacific. A strong temperature boundary developed, separating the warm, moist airmass across the southern U.S. from the colder, drier airmass to the north. As surface impulses moved along the frontal boundary, the stage was set for a widespread variety of winter weather. An upper-level low progressing eastward across the central Pacific provided the added ingredients for a prolonged precipitation event.

== Aftermath ==
The storm left up to 2 inches of ice over the affected regions on the evening of January 30. Affected infrastructure initially held, but began to crumble as the night wore on. Electric transformers were prone to explosion and in some cases created small fires, and trees shattered under the weight of hundreds of pounds of ice. Larger trees were actually more susceptible to cracking and falling than smaller trees, with mature pin oak trees falling, while saplings remained undamaged. After January 31, more than 650,000 residents were without power, including 350,000 in the Kansas City metropolitan area alone and 250,000 in Oklahoma. In some cases, power didn't return to residents for nearly 14 days. Approximately 500,000 trees were affected in Kansas City alone, including two "Bicentennial Trees" which were estimated at being over 200 years old. States of emergency were announced by the governors of all three states. Then on the tail end of the storm, some places got snow on top of the ice that had fallen, only worsening the problem.

== See also ==
- North Carolina ice storm of 2002
