= North Carolina ice storm of 2002 =

Weather event in North Carolina, United States

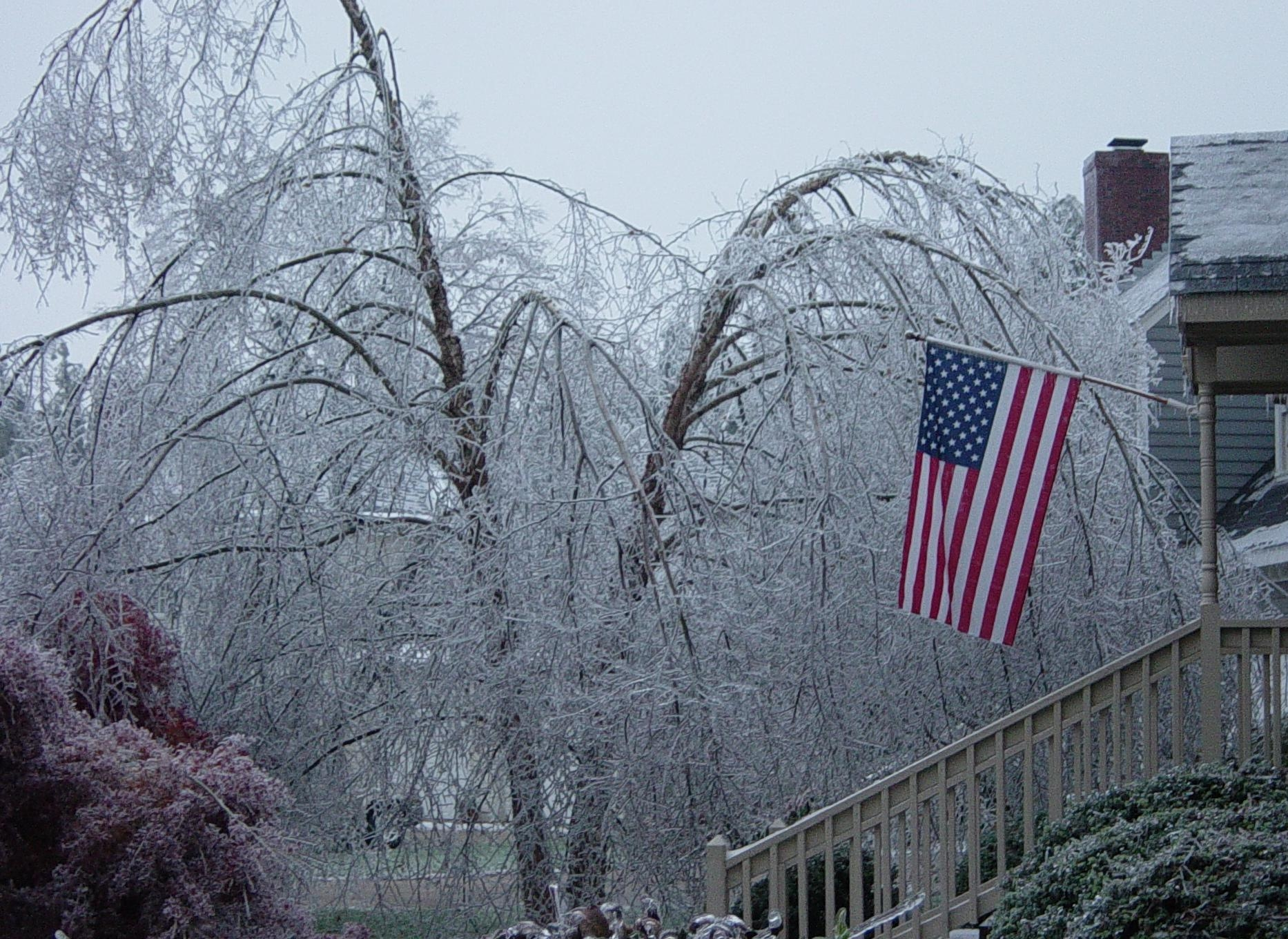
Ice build up on trees during the storm

The North Carolina ice storm of 2002 caused up to an inch of freezing rain from December 4–5 in central North Carolina. A total of 24 people were killed, and as many as 1.8 million people were left without electricity on December 6. Power outages began December 4, and power was not completely restored until December 14. Raleigh received the most freezing rain from a single storm since 1948, and Bristol, Tennessee received the most ice it had seen in 28 years. The storm also produced heavy rain in both the mountains and coastal plain of North Carolina. Much of the Southern Plains and the Northeast received snow with this system.

During the power outages, many residents used propane and kerosene powered generators and heaters to combat the cold, with some resorting to moving charcoal grills indoors to heat their households. The increased usage of these heating methods, particularly grills led to a substantial number of cases of carbon monoxide poisoning. Varying reports allege 48 to 200 cases of poisoning. Hispanic residents were disproportionately affected by the impacts of the ice storm, sustaining 23% of total injuries and 65% of carbon monoxide poisonings during the storm period.

== See also ==
- Ice storm
- Winter storm
- 2002 Central Plains ice storm
