= Freezing rain =

Rain maintained at temperatures below freezing

Freezing rain is rain maintained at temperatures below freezing by the ambient air mass that causes freezing on contact with surfaces. Unlike a mixture of rain and snow or ice pellets, freezing rain is made entirely of liquid droplets. The raindrops become supercooled while passing through a subfreezing layer of air hundreds of meters above the ground, and then freeze upon impact with any surface they encounter, including the ground, trees, electrical wires, aircraft, and automobiles. The resulting ice, called glaze ice, can accumulate to a thickness of several centimeters and cover all exposed surfaces. The METAR code for freezing rain is FZRA.

A storm that produces a significant thickness of glaze ice from freezing rain is often referred to as an ice storm. Although these storms are not particularly violent, freezing rain is notorious for causing travel problems on roadways, breaking tree limbs, and downing power lines from the weight of accumulating ice. Downed power lines cause power outages in affected areas while accumulated ice can also pose significant overhead hazards. It is also known for being extremely dangerous to aircraft since the ice can effectively 'remould' the shape of the airfoil and flight control surfaces. (See atmospheric icing.)

== Mechanism ==
Temperature versus height diagram for different types of precipitation. The red line shows how freezing rain forms, from snow through the warm layer and then into the "supercooled stage".

Freezing rain is often associated with the approach of a warm front, when subfreezing air (temperatures at or below freezing) is trapped in the lowest levels of the atmosphere while warm air is advected aloft. This happens, for instance, when a low pressure system moves from the Mississippi River Valley toward the Appalachian Mountains and the Saint Lawrence River Valley of North America during the cold season, with a strong high pressure system sitting further east. This setup is known as cold-air damming, and is characterized by very cold and dry air at the surface within the region of high pressure. The warm air from the Gulf of Mexico is often the fuel for freezing precipitation.

Freezing rain develops when falling snow encounters a layer of warm air aloft, typically around the 800 mbar (800 hPa; 80 kPa) level, causing the snow to melt and become rain. As the rain continues to fall, it passes through a layer of subfreezing air just above the surface and cools to a temperature below freezing (0 °C or 32 °F or 273 K). If this layer of subfreezing air is sufficiently deep, the raindrops may have time to freeze into ice pellets (sleet) before reaching the ground. However, if the subfreezing layer of air at the surface is very shallow, the rain drops falling through it will not have time to freeze and they will hit the ground as supercooled rain. In addition to the classical melting mechanism, studies identify a supercooled warm-rain process in which liquid droplets form and remain unfrozen until contact with surfaces at or below 0 °C. When these supercooled drops make contact with the ground, power lines, tree branches, aircraft, or anything else below 0 °C, a portion of the drops instantly freezes, forming a thin film of ice, hence freezing rain. The specific physical process by which this occurs is called nucleation.

== Observations ==
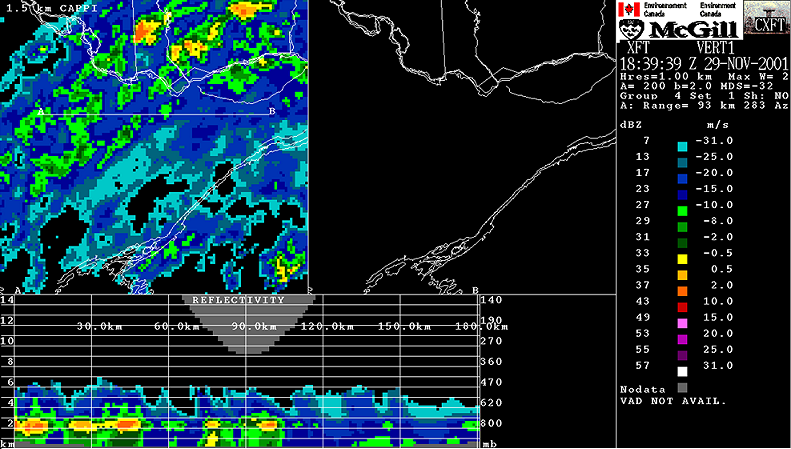
Echoes at 1.5 km (1,500 m; 0.93 mi; 4,900 ft) altitude at the top with strong contamination from the bright band (yellows). The vertical cut at the bottom show that this strong return is only above ground (Source: Environment Canada).

Surface observations by staffed or automatic stations are the only direct confirmation of freezing rain. One can never see directly freezing rain, rain, or snow on any type of weather radar, whether Doppler or conventional. It is possible, however, to estimate the area covered by freezing rain with radar indirectly.

The intensity of the radar echoes (reflectivity) is proportional to the form (water or ice) of the precipitation and its diameter. In fact, rain has much stronger reflective power than snow, but its diameter is much smaller. So, the reflectivity of rain coming from melted snow is only slightly higher. In the layer where the snow is melting, however, the wet flakes still have a large diameter and are coated with water, so the radar returns are much stronger.

The presence of this brightband indicates the presence of a warm layer above ground where snow can melt. This could be producing rain on the ground or the possibility of freezing rain if the temperature is below freezing. The accompanying image shows how such an artifact can be located with a cross-section through radar data. The height and slope of the brightband will give clues to the extent of the region where melting is occurring. Then, it is possible to associate this clue with surface observations and numerical prediction models to produce output such as the ones seen on television weather programs, where radar echoes are shown distinctly as rain, mixed, and snow precipitations.

If the radar is dual-polarized, meaning it sends out vertically and horizontally polarized waves, one can compare the return signals from these two perspectives of the precipitation. One then can deduce the shape of the targets, the mixture of states, etc., and thus determine the type of precipitation indirectly.

== Effects ==
=== At ground level ===
Freezing rain often causes major power outages by forming glaze ice. When the freezing rain or drizzle is light and not prolonged, the ice formed is thin and usually causes only minor damage (relieving trees of their dead branches, etc.). When large quantities accumulate, however, it is one of the most dangerous types of winter hazard. When the ice layer exceeds approximately 6.4 mm (0.25 in), tree limbs with branches heavily coated in ice can break off under the enormous weight and fall onto power lines. Windy conditions and lightning, when present, will exacerbate the damage. Power lines coated with ice become extremely heavy, causing support poles, insulators and lines to break. The ice that forms on roadways makes vehicle travel dangerous. Unlike snow, wet ice provides almost no traction, and vehicles will slide even on gentle slopes. Because freezing rain does not hit the ground as an ice pellet (called "sleet") but still as a rain droplet, it conforms to the shape of the ground, or object such as a tree branch or car. This makes one thick layer of ice, often called "glaze".

Freezing rain and glaze ice on a large scale is called an ice storm. Effects on plants can be severe, as they cannot support the weight of the ice. Trees may snap as they are dormant and fragile during winter weather. Pine trees are also victims of ice storms as their needles will catch the ice, but not be able to support the weight. In February 1994, a severe ice storm caused over $1 billion in damage in the Southern United States, primarily in Mississippi, Tennessee, Alabama, and Western North Carolina, especially the Appalachians. One particularly severe ice storm struck eastern Canada and northern parts of New York and New England in the North American ice storm of 1998.

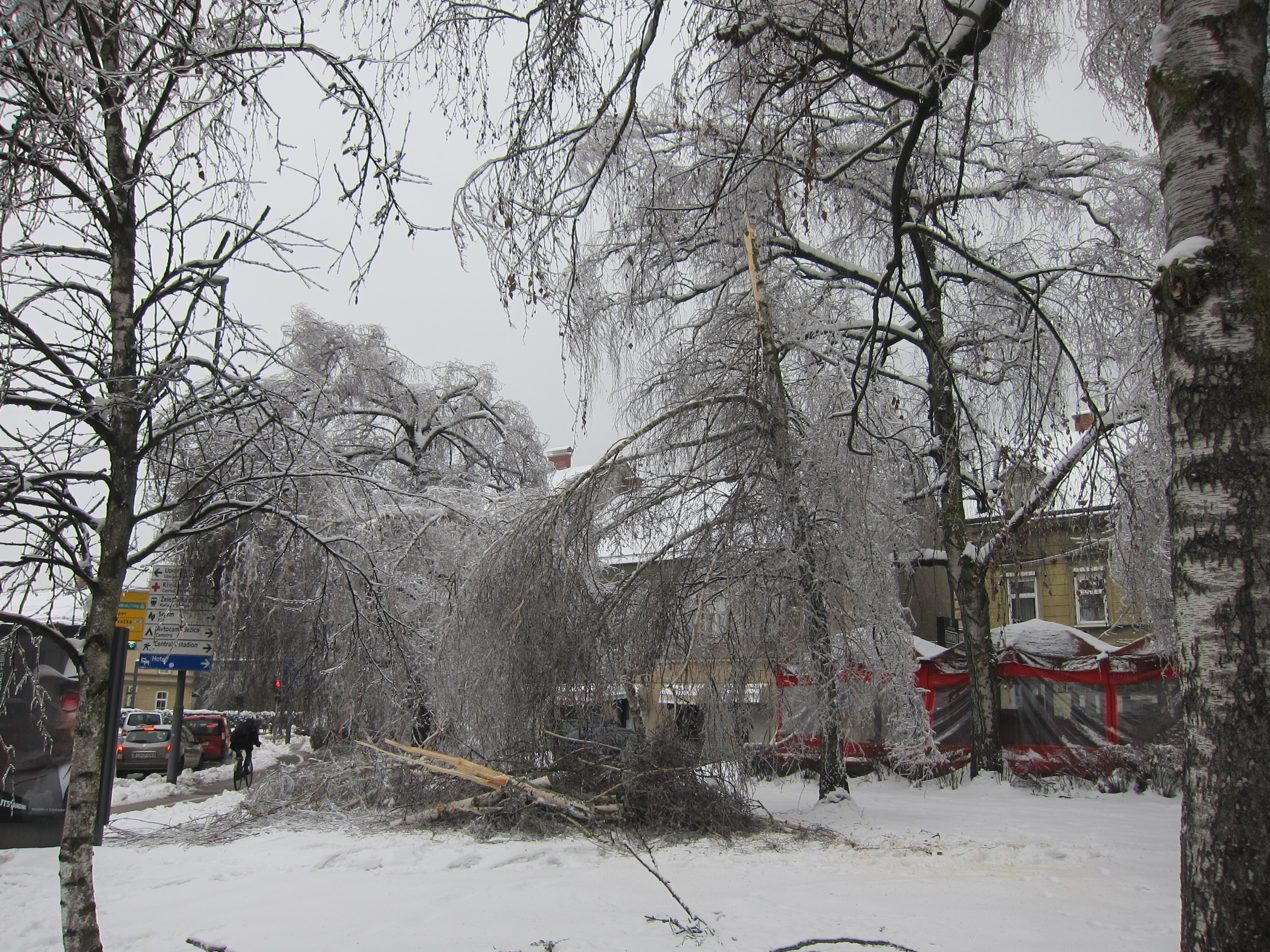
Tree downed by a thick layer of glaze in downtown Ljubljana, Slovenia

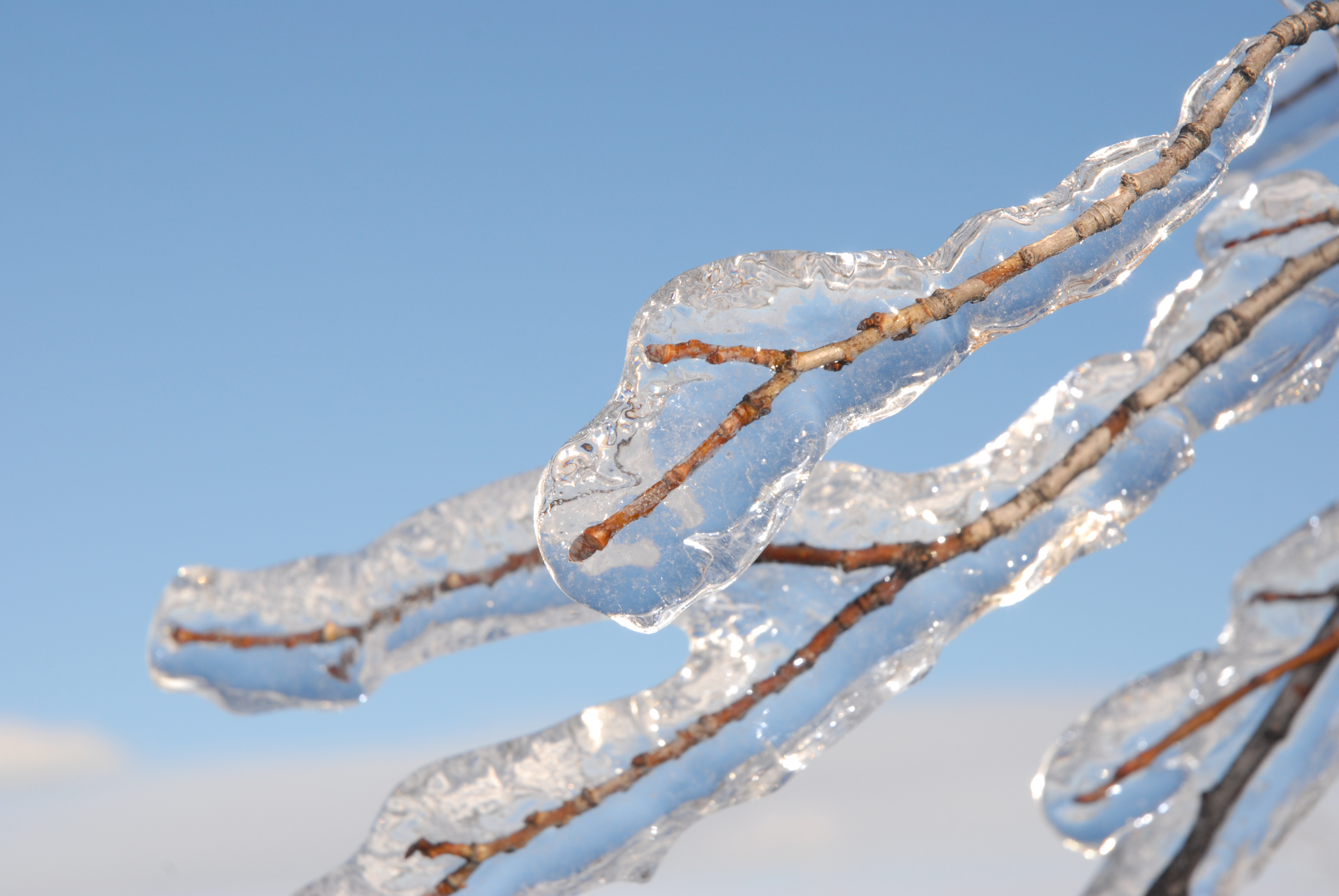
Glaze on a tree in La Malbaie, Quebec

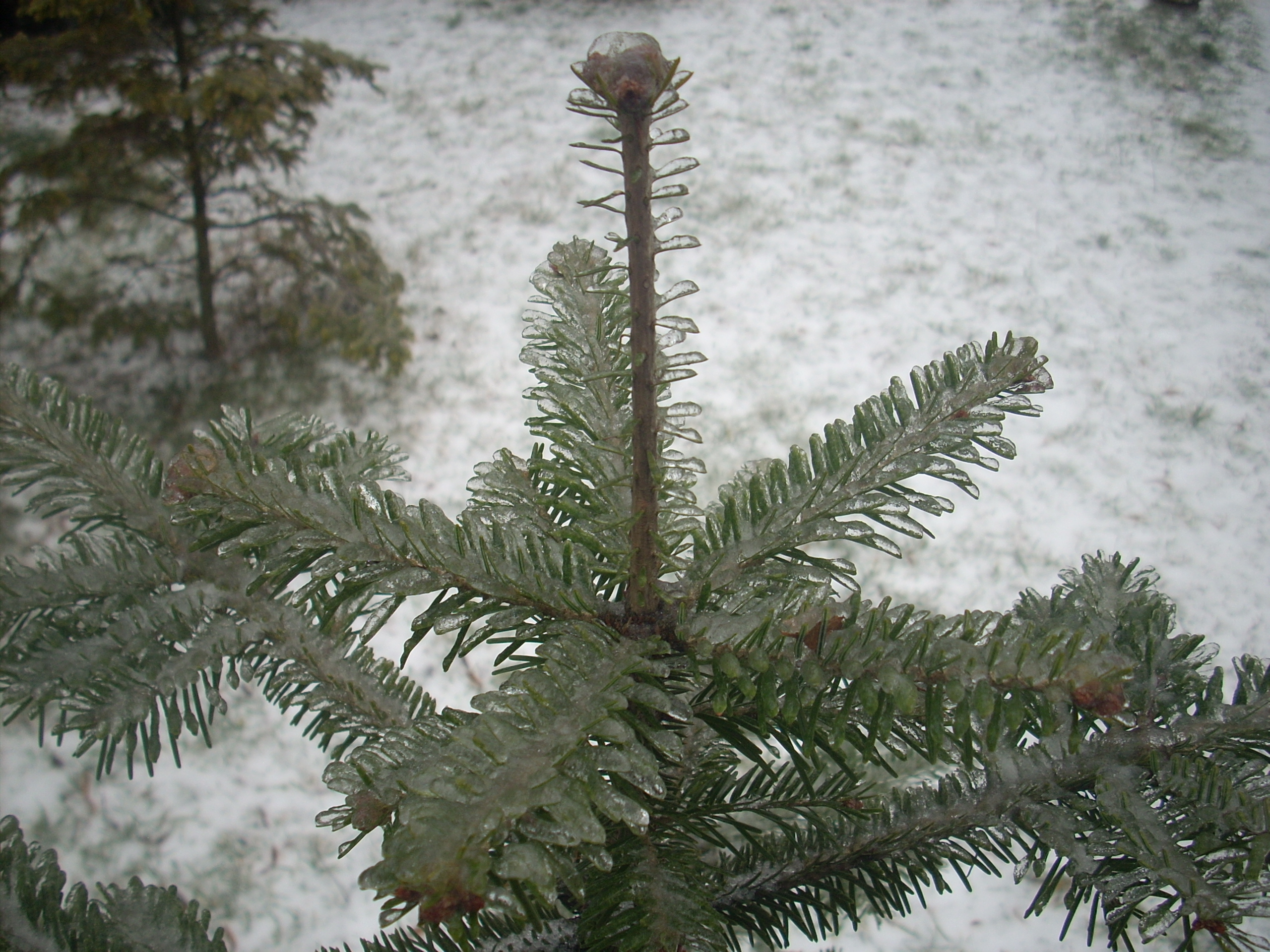
Ice on coniferous tree in Tomaszów Mazowiecki, Poland

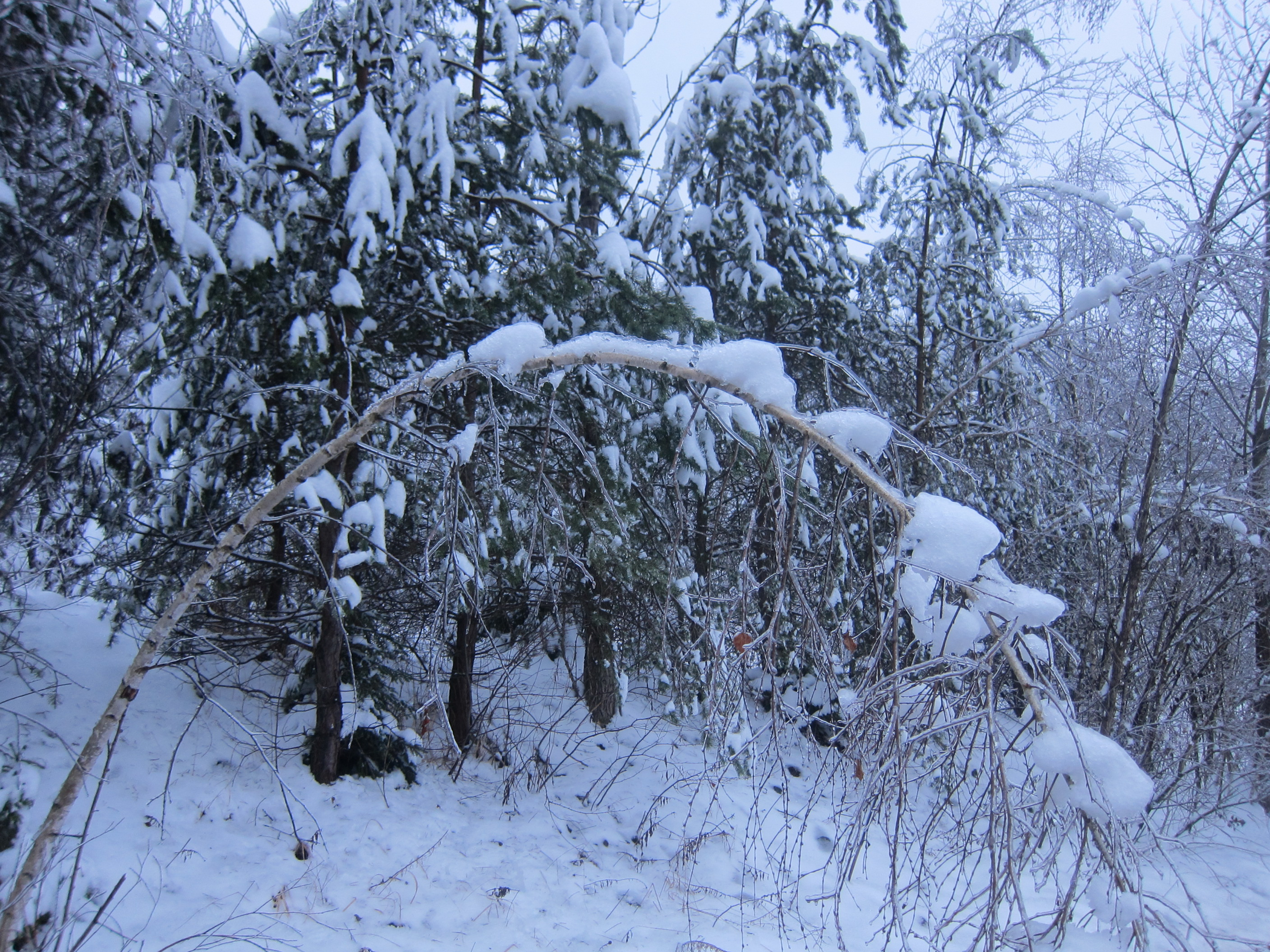
A birch tree is badly bent under a thick layer of glaze ice in Celje, Slovenia

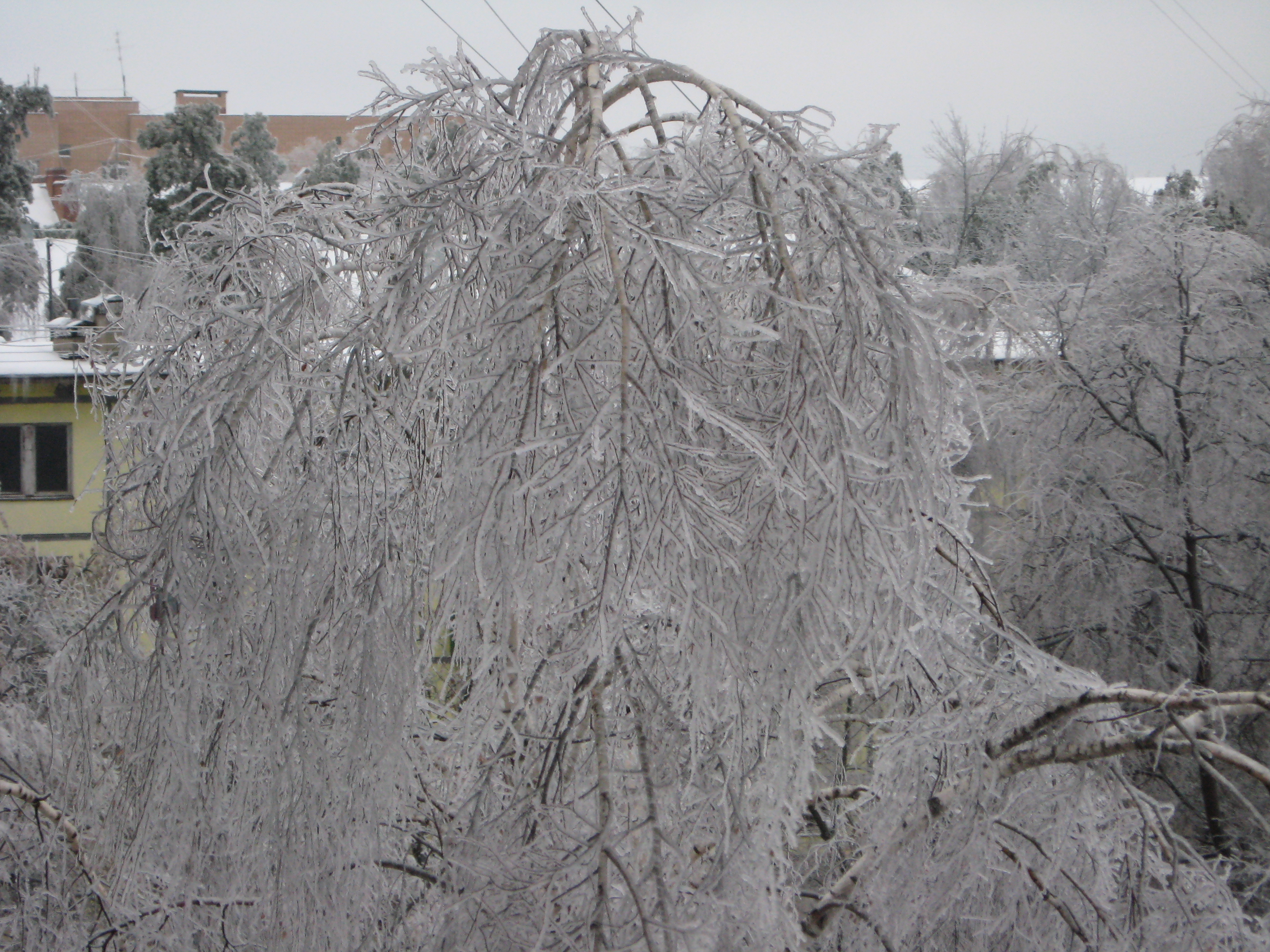
Aftermath of freezing rain in Moscow Oblast, Russia, December 2010

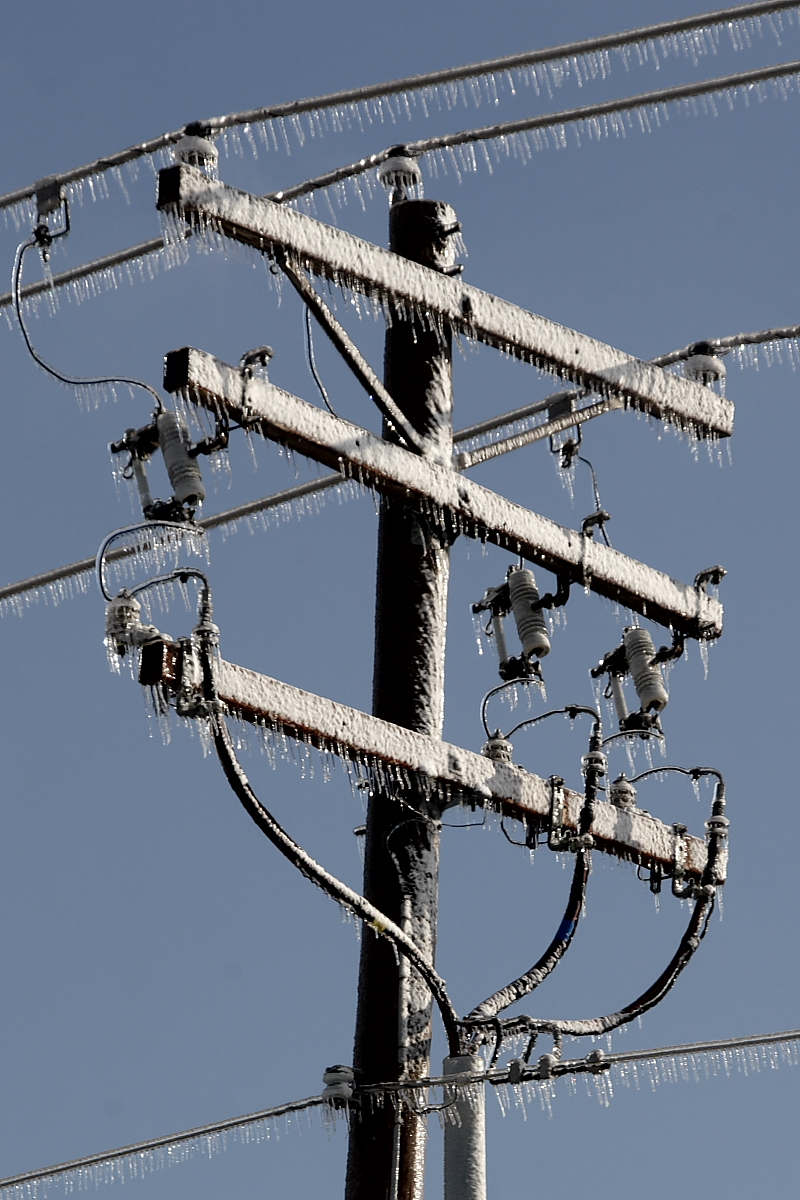
Power outages due to the weight of ice on lines or overhanging tree limbs

=== Aircraft ===
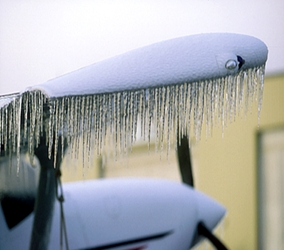
Ice on aircraft wing

Freezing rain is considered to be an extreme hazard to aircraft, as it causes very rapid structural icing, freezing necessary components. Most helicopters and small airplanes lack the necessary deicing equipment to fly in freezing rain of any intensity, and heavy freezing rain can overwhelm even the most sophisticated deicing systems on large airplanes. Icing can increase an aircraft's weight but not typically enough to cause a hazard. The main danger comes from the ice changing the shape of its airfoils. This will reduce lift and increase drag. All three factors increase stalling speed and reduce aircraft performance, making it very difficult to climb or even maintain altitude.

An aircraft can most easily avoid freezing rain by moving into warmer air. Under most conditions, this would require aircraft to descend, which it can usually do safely and easily even with a moderate accumulation of structural ice. However, freezing rain is accompanied by a temperature inversion aloft, meaning that aircraft are required to climb to move into warmer air, which is a potentially difficult and dangerous task with even a small amount of ice accumulation.

For example, in 1994, American Eagle Flight 4184 encountered heavy air traffic and poor weather that postponed the arrival of this flight at Chicago's O'Hare International Airport, where it was to have landed en route from Indianapolis, Indiana. The ATR-72, a twin-engine turboprop carrying 68 people, entered a holding pattern 105 km or 65 mi southeast of O'Hare. As the plane circled, supercooled cloud droplets, freezing rain or freezing drizzle formed a ridge of ice on the upper surface of its wings, eventually causing the aircraft's autopilot to suddenly disconnect and the pilots to lose control. The ATR disintegrated on impact with a field below; all passengers and crew were killed.

Until recently, aircraft were not certified to fly in these conditions, however, in response to American Eagle Flight 4184, regulators introduced amendments (for example, EASA CS-25 Amendment 16) meaning new large transport aircraft will now need to consider flight in freezing rain as part of certification.

=== Ghost apples ===
On one occasion, freezing rain was observed to settle on hanging rotting apples and icing over them immediately, creating a glaze coating. Because of apples' lower freezing point than water, under warmer temperature the apples defrosted before the ice did, then the rotting apple mush slipped out of the bottom, leaving icy shells. These icy shells in the form of apples were called ghost apples and were observed in Michigan, United States in February 2019. A similar phenomenon was observed in February 2015 in Greenville, North Carolina, when a Jeep that had backed out of the parking lot left behind an ice shell of its lower front part (with grille and bumper) standing on icicles.

== See also ==
- Black ice
- Freezing drizzle
- Hail
- Ice pellets
- Ice storm
- Icing conditions
- List of ice storms
