= Churchill, Manitoba =

Town in Manitoba, Canada

Churchill
- Town
- Town of Churchill
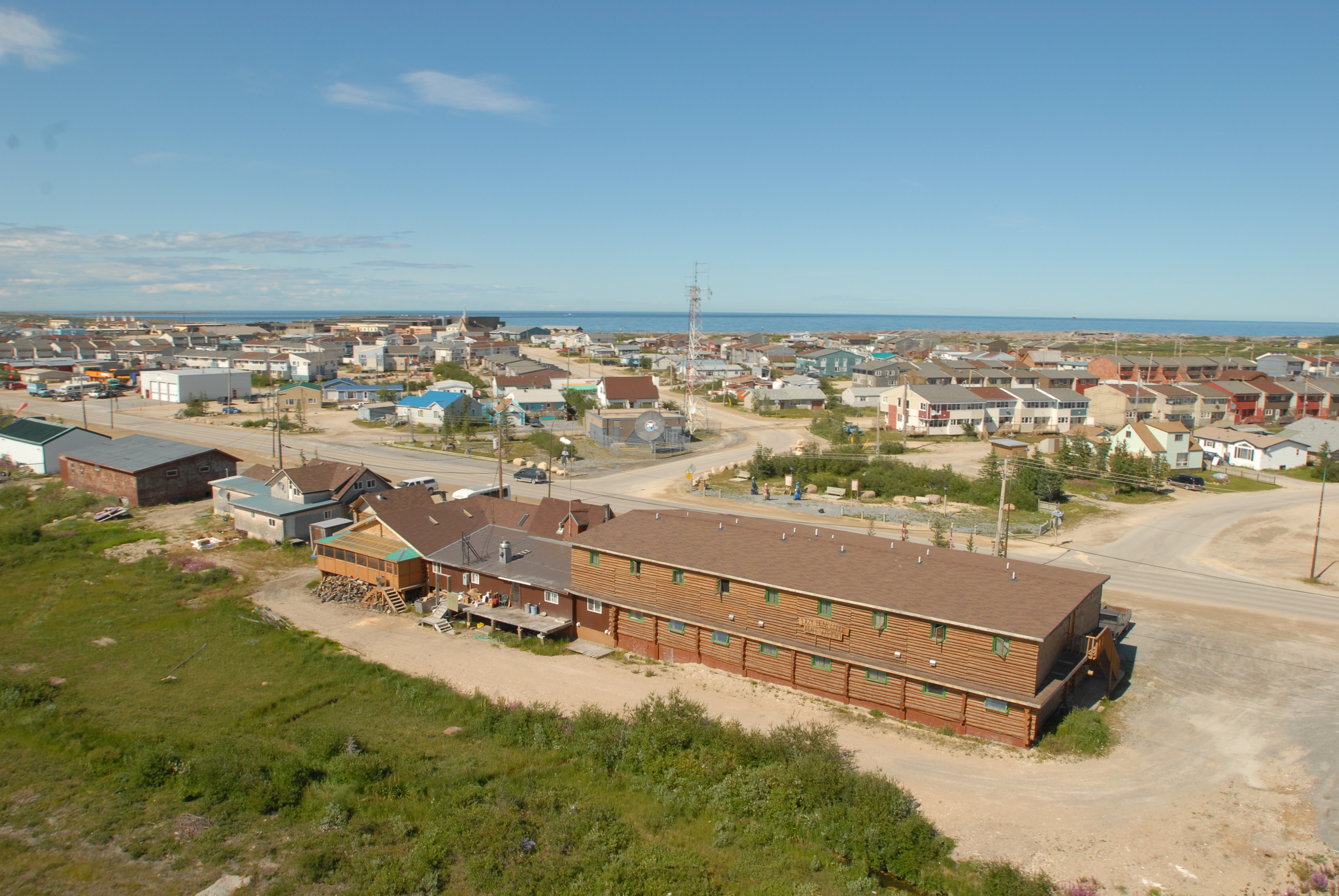
- Churchill in 2010

- Flag
- Nicknames: "Polar Bear Capital of the World," "Beluga Capital of the World"
- Churchill in Manitoba Churchill (Canada)
- Coordinates: 58°46′51″N 094°11′13″W
- Country: Canada
- Province: Manitoba
- Region: Northern
- Census division: 23

Government
  - Type: Town Council
  - Mayor: Michael Spence
  - MP: Rebecca Chartrand
  - MLA: Eric Redhead

Area (2021)
  - Land: 50.83 km^{2} (19.63 sq mi)
- Elevation: 0 m (0 ft)
- Highest elevation: 29 m (94 ft)
- Lowest elevation: 0 m (0 ft)

Population (2021)
  - Total: 870
  - Density: 17.1/km^{2} (44/sq mi)
- Time zone: UTC−06:00 (CST)
  - Summer (DST): UTC−05:00 (CDT)
- Postal code: R0B 0E0
- Area codes: 204, 431
- Website: churchill.ca

Churchill is a subarctic port town in northern Manitoba, Canada, on the west shore of Hudson Bay, roughly 140 km (87 mi) from the Manitoba–Nunavut border. It was named after John Churchill, 1st Duke of Marlborough and governor of the Hudson's Bay Company from 1685 to 1691. It is well known for the many polar bears that move toward the shore from inland in the autumn, leading to the nickname "Polar Bear Capital of the World" and to the benefit of its burgeoning tourism industry.

== Geography ==
Churchill is located on the Hudson Bay, at the mouth of the Churchill River on the 58th parallel north, far north of most Canadian populated areas. Churchill is far from any other towns or cities, with Gillam, approximately 270 km (170 mi) to the south, being the closest larger settlement. Manitoba's provincial capital, Winnipeg, is approximately 1,000 km (620 mi) south of Churchill. While not part of the city, Eskimo Point and Eskimo Island are located across the river at the former site of the Prince of Wales Fort.

== History ==
Various nomadic Arctic peoples lived and hunted in this region. The Thule people arrived around the year 1000 from the west, the ancestors of the present-day Inuit. The Dene people arrived around the year 500 from farther north. Since before the time of European contact, the region around Churchill has been predominantly inhabited by the Chipewyan and Cree peoples.

Europeans first arrived in the area in 1619 when a Danish expedition led by Jens Munk wintered near where Churchill would later stand. Only 3 of 64 expedition members survived the winter and sailed one of the expedition's two ships, the sloop Lamprey, back to Denmark. Danish archaeologists in 1964 discovered remains of the abandoned ship, the frigate Unicorn, in the tidal flats some kilometres from the mouth of the river. The discoveries were all taken to Denmark; some are on display at the National Museum in Copenhagen.

After an abortive attempt in 1688–89, in 1717, the Hudson's Bay Company built the first permanent settlement, Churchill River Post, a log fort a few kilometres upstream from the mouth of the Churchill River. The trading post and river were named after John Churchill, 1st Duke of Marlborough, who was governor of the Hudson's Bay Company in the late 17th century. The fort, Prince of Wales Fort, was rebuilt at the mouth of the river. The fort was primarily built to capitalize on the North American fur trade, out of the reach of York Factory. It dealt mainly with the Chipewyan living north of the boreal forest. Much of the fur came from as far away as Lake Athabasca and the Rocky Mountains. A defensive battery, Cape Merry Battery, was built on the opposite side of the fort to provide protection.

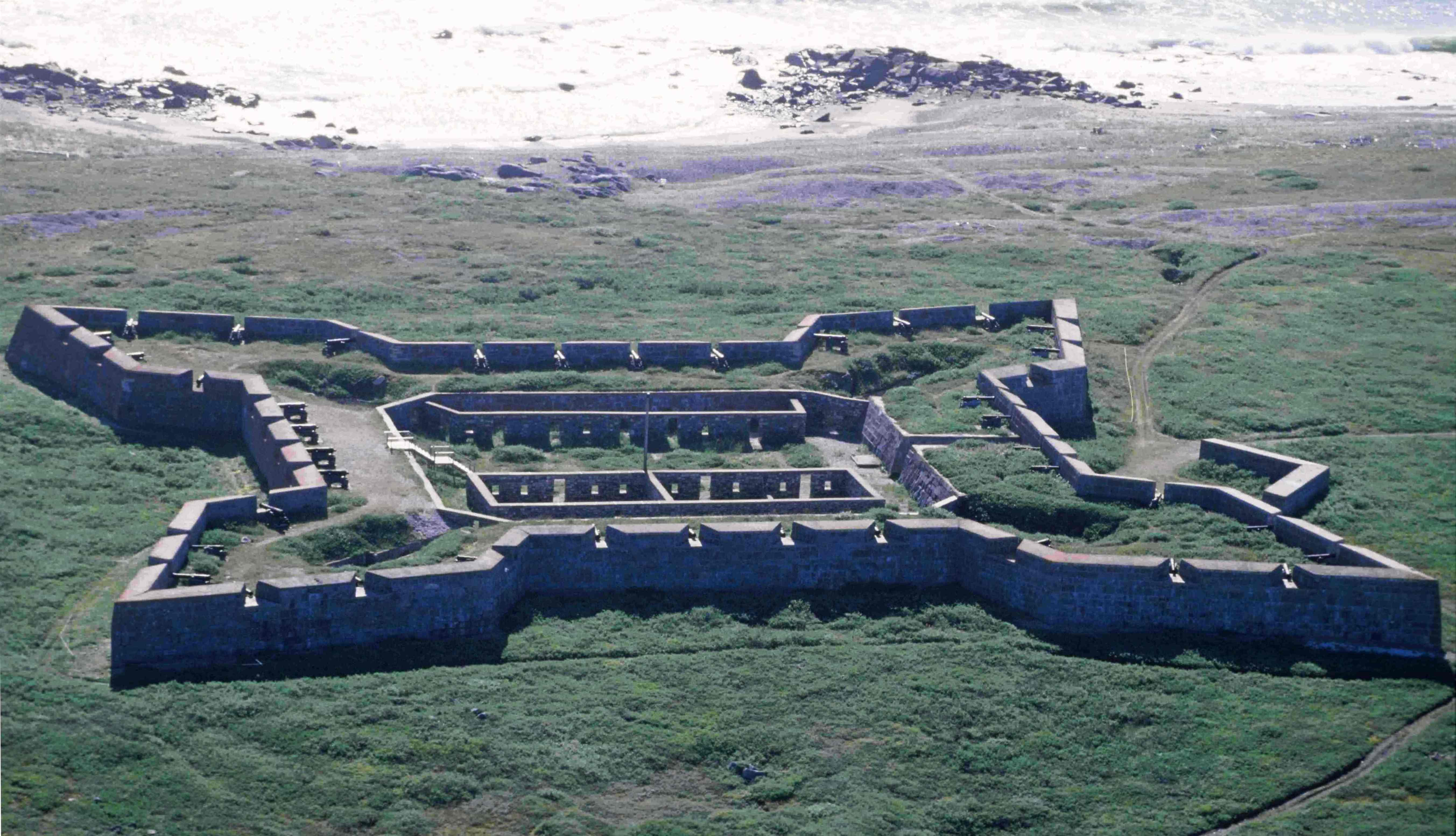
Prince of Wales Fort

As part of the Anglo-French dispute for North America, in 1731–1741, the original fort was replaced with Prince of Wales Fort, a large stone fort on the western peninsula at the mouth of the river. In 1782, the French Hudson Bay expedition, led by La Pérouse, captured it. Since the British, under Samuel Hearne, were greatly outnumbered and, in any event, were not soldiers, they surrendered without firing a shot. The leaders agreed Hearne would be released and given safe passage to England, along with 31 British civilians, in the sloop Severn, on condition he immediately publish his story A Journey to the Northern Ocean. In return, the British promised the same number of French prisoners would be released, and a British seaman familiar with the waters safely navigated the French away from the Hudson's Bay coastline at a time of year when the French risked becoming trapped in winter ice. The French made an unsuccessful attempt to demolish the fort. The worst effect was on the local indigenous peoples, who had become dependent on trade goods from the fort, and many of them starved. Hearne returned to Churchill the following year but found trade had deteriorated. The First Nations population that had survived the incursion had moved to other posts. Hearne's health began to fail and he delivered up command at Churchill on 16 August 1787 and returned to England. Extensive reconstruction and stabilization of the fort's remains have occurred since the 1950s, and is currently maintained as a heritage site by Parks Canada.

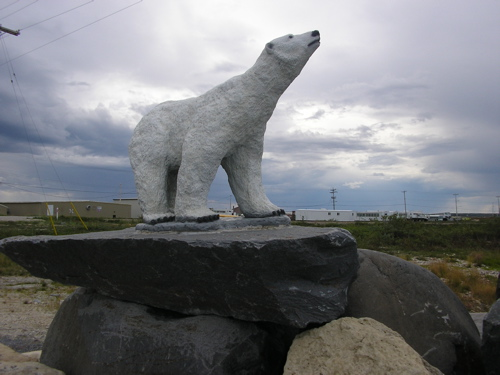
Polar bear statue in Churchill, Manitoba, Canada

Between the years of decline in the fur trade and the emergence of Western agricultural success, Churchill phased into and then back out of obsolescence. After decades of frustration over the monopoly and domination of the Canadian Pacific Railway, western Canadian governments banded together. They aggressively negotiated for the creation of a significant new northern shipping harbour on Hudson Bay, linked by rail from Winnipeg. Initially, Port Nelson was selected for this purpose in 1912. After several years of effort and millions of dollars, this project was abandoned, and Churchill was chosen as the alternative after World War One. Surveys by the Canadian Hydrographic Service ship CSS Acadia opened the way for safe navigation. Construction was completed by 1929.

Once this transportation rail link from farms to the Churchill port was completed, commercial shipping took many more years to pick up. In 1932, Grant MacEwan was the first person to cross through Churchill customs as a passenger. This was purely due to his determination to take the Hudson Bay route to Saskatchewan from Britain—most passengers returned via the St. Lawrence River.

In 1942, the United States Army Air Forces established a base called Fort Churchill, 8 km (5.0 mi) east of the town. After World War II, the base served several other purposes, including being a Royal Canadian Air Force (RCAF) and a Strategic Air Command facility. Following the demolition of the base it was repurposed into the town's airport.

Naval Radio Station Churchill, call sign CFL, was activated as an ionospheric study station by the Royal Canadian Navy in support of the U-boat high-frequency direction finding (HFDF) net and became operational on 1 August 1943. Around 1949, Churchill became part of the Canadian SUPRAD (signals intelligence) network and remained in that role until it closed its doors in 1968. The Operations and Accommodations building remains today but is abandoned.

This area was also the site of the Churchill Rocket Research Range, part of Canadian-American atmospheric research. Its first rocket was launched in 1956, and it continued to host launches for research until closing in 1984. The site of the former rocket range now hosts the Churchill Northern Studies Centre, a facility for multidisciplinary Arctic research.

In the 1950s, the British government considered establishing a site near Churchill for testing their early nuclear weapons before choosing Australia instead.

Up to the early 1970s, Churchill was the location to which Iqaluit children were sent for high school, prior to the opening of Iqaluit's own school.

== Environment ==
Churchill is situated at the estuary of the Churchill River at Hudson Bay. The small community stands at an ecotone, on the Hudson Plains at the juncture of three ecoregions: the boreal forest to the south, the Arctic tundra to the northwest, and the Hudson Bay to the north. Wapusk National Park, located at 57°46′26″N 93°22′17″W, is to the southeast of the town.

The landscape around Churchill is influenced by shallow soils caused by a combination of subsurface permafrost and Canadian Shield rock formation. The black spruce dominant tree cover is sparse and stunted by these environmental constraints. There is also a noticeable ice pruning effect on the trees. The area also offers sport fishing. Several tour operators offer expeditions on land, sea and air, using all-terrain vehicles, tundra buggies, boats, canoes, helicopters, and ultralight aircraft.

=== Aurora borealis ===
Like all northern communities in Canada, Churchill can sometimes see the aurora borealis (Northern Lights) when there is a high amount of solar activity and the skies are clear, usually in February and March. Visibility also depends on the sky being dark enough to see them, which usually precludes their visibility in the summer due to nautical twilight all night long.

=== Climate ===
Churchill has a very harsh subarctic climate (Köppen climate classification: Dfc) with long, frigid winters (from early October to May) and short, cool to mild summers. Churchill's winters are much colder than a coastal location at a latitude of 58 degrees north should warrant. The shallow Hudson Bay freezes over in the winter, eliminating maritime transit. Prevailing northerly winds from the North Pole jet across the frozen bay, leading to a January average temperature of −26.0 °C (−14.8 °F), comparable to the frigid cold in the Siberian Arctic city of Norilsk, which is at a much higher latitude of 69 degrees north. Juneau, Alaska, by contrast, is also at a latitude of 58 degrees north but is moderated by the warmer and much deeper Pacific Ocean. Juneau's −3.5 °C (25.7 °F) January average temperature is a full 22.5 °C (40.5 °F) warmer than Churchill's.

Climate data for Churchill (Churchill Airport) Climate ID: 5060600; coordinates 58°44′21″N 94°03′59″W; elevation: 29.3 m (96 ft); 1991−2020 normals, extremes 1929−present
Month	Jan	Feb	Mar	Apr	May	Jun	Jul	Aug	Sep	Oct	Nov	Dec	Year
Record high humidex	1.2	1.7	8.3	28.0	30.7	36.5	39.7	44.2	34.1	23.0	5.5	2.8	44.2
Record high °C (°F)	1.7 (35.1)	1.8 (35.2)	9.0 (48.2)	28.2 (82.8)	28.9 (84.0)	32.2 (90.0)	36.9 (98.4)	34.5 (94.1)	29.2 (84.6)	21.7 (71.1)	7.2 (45.0)	3.0 (37.4)	36.9 (98.4)
Mean daily maximum °C (°F)	−21.2 (−6.2)	−20.0 (−4.0)	−13.7 (7.3)	−5.0 (23.0)	2.9 (37.2)	12.8 (55.0)	18.2 (64.8)	16.7 (62.1)	10.4 (50.7)	1.8 (35.2)	−8.3 (17.1)	−17.0 (1.4)	−1.9 (28.6)
Daily mean °C (°F)	−25.3 (−13.5)	−24.3 (−11.7)	−18.6 (−1.5)	−9.7 (14.5)	−0.9 (30.4)	7.6 (45.7)	13.0 (55.4)	12.5 (54.5)	7.1 (44.8)	−0.7 (30.7)	−12.0 (10.4)	−20.9 (−5.6)	−6.0 (21.2)
Mean daily minimum °C (°F)	−29.2 (−20.6)	−28.5 (−19.3)	−23.5 (−10.3)	−14.4 (6.1)	−4.7 (23.5)	2.5 (36.5)	7.8 (46.0)	8.2 (46.8)	3.7 (38.7)	−3.2 (26.2)	−15.8 (3.6)	−24.8 (−12.6)	−10.2 (13.6)
Record low °C (°F)	−45.6 (−50.1)	−45.4 (−49.7)	−43.9 (−47.0)	−34.0 (−29.2)	−25.2 (−13.4)	−9.4 (15.1)	−2.2 (28.0)	−2.2 (28.0)	−11.7 (10.9)	−24.5 (−12.1)	−36.1 (−33.0)	−43.9 (−47.0)	−45.6 (−50.1)
Record low wind chill	−64.4	−62.6	−61.4	−56.6	−37.1	−12.7	−6.9	−6.2	−16.7	−35.5	−51.1	−58.5	−64.4
Average precipitation mm (inches)	14.7 (0.58)	13.8 (0.54)	14.1 (0.56)	15.8 (0.62)	25.2 (0.99)	42.0 (1.65)	74.0 (2.91)	80.5 (3.17)	74.9 (2.95)	49.9 (1.96)	28.9 (1.14)	14.9 (0.59)	447.7 (17.63)
Average rainfall mm (inches)	0.0 (0.0)	0.0 (0.0)	0.4 (0.02)	1.1 (0.04)	16.1 (0.63)	41.0 (1.61)	59.8 (2.35)	69.3 (2.73)	66.0 (2.60)	20.9 (0.82)	1.3 (0.05)	0.1 (0.00)	276.0 (10.87)
Average snowfall cm (inches)	21.7 (8.5)	19.3 (7.6)	20.4 (8.0)	24.9 (9.8)	15.5 (6.1)	3.3 (1.3)	0.0 (0.0)	0.0 (0.0)	4.2 (1.7)	29.8 (11.7)	39.2 (15.4)	22.9 (9.0)	201.2 (79.2)
Average precipitation days (≥ 0.2 mm)	12.2	10.9	10.2	8.8	9.9	11.7	14.5	16.7	16.5	16.7	15.7	13.1	156.8
Average rainy days (≥ 0.2 mm)	0.09	0.05	0.45	1.4	5.1	10.7	13.9	14.9	14.5	6.5	0.91	0.24	67.5
Average snowy days (≥ 0.2 cm)	11.9	10.3	11.1	8.3	6.7	1.5	0.0	0.06	2.6	11.6	15.6	12.3	92.1
Average relative humidity (%) (at 1500 LST)	70.5	68.5	69.9	73.2	75.8	66.4	65.3	69.0	72.1	80.1	82.3	75.5	72.4
Average dew point °C (°F)	−30.2 (−22.4)	−28.5 (−19.3)	−22.0 (−7.6)	−11.3 (11.7)	−3.5 (25.7)	2.7 (36.9)	7.4 (45.3)	7.5 (45.5)	2.4 (36.3)	−3.3 (26.1)	−13.8 (7.2)	−25.1 (−13.2)	−9.8 (14.3)
Mean monthly sunshine hours	79.7	117.7	177.8	198.2	197.0	243.0	281.7	225.9	112.0	58.1	55.3	53.1	1,799.5
Percentage possible sunshine	36.2	45.1	48.7	45.8	37.7	44.3	51.6	47.2	29.0	18.2	23.5	26.7	37.8
Source: Environment and Climate Change Canada (rain/rain days, snow/snow days 1981–2010) (dew point 1300 LST 1951–1980) Canadian Climate Normals 1951–1980

== Economy ==
Tourism and ecotourism are significant contributors to the local economy, with the polar bear season (October and November) being the largest. Tourists also visit to watch beluga whales in the Churchill River in June and July. The area is also popular for birdwatchers and to view the aurora borealis.

The Port of Churchill is the terminus for the Hudson Bay Railway operated by the Arctic Gateway Group. The port facilities handle shipments of grain and other commodities around the world. The Churchill Northern Studies Centre also attracts visitors and academics from around the world who are interested in sub-Arctic and Arctic research. The town also has a health centre, several hotels, tour operators, and restaurants; it serves locals and visitors.

=== Ecotourism ===
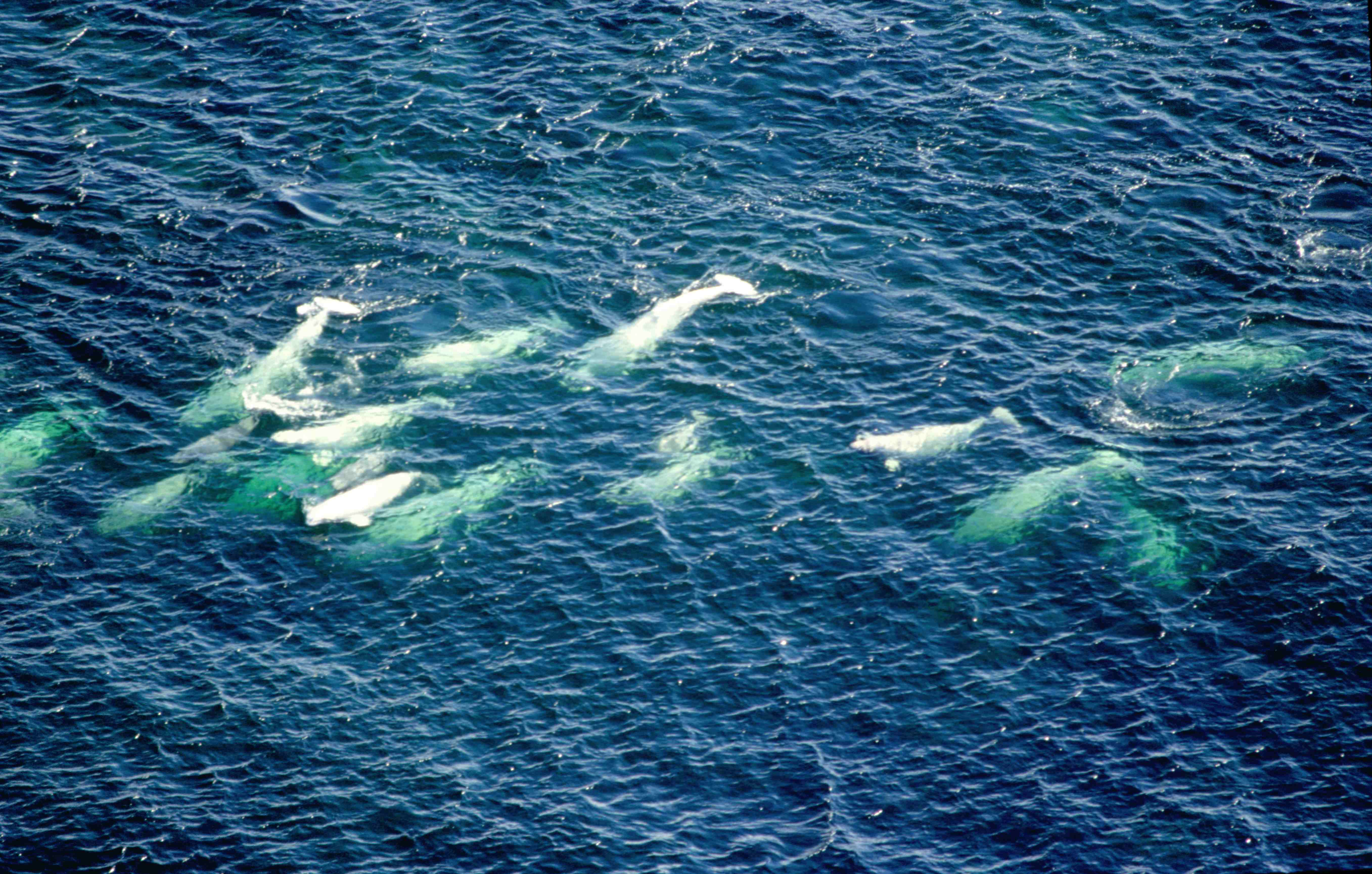
Beluga whales

Churchill is situated along Manitoba's 1,400 km (870 mi) coastline, on Hudson Bay at the meeting of three major biomes: marine, boreal forest and tundra, each supporting a variety of flora and fauna. Each year, 10,000–12,000 eco-tourists visit, about 400–500 of whom are birders.

==== Polar bears ====
Polar bears were once considered solitary animals that would avoid contact with other bears except for mating. In the Churchill region, however, many alliances between bears are made in the fall. These friendships last only until the ice forms. Then, it is every bear for itself to hunt ringed seals. Starting in the 1980s, the town developed a sizable tourism industry focused on the migration habits of the polar bear.

Local authorities maintain a so-called "polar bear jail" where bears (primarily adolescents) who persistently loiter in or close to town, are held after being tranquillised, pending release back into the wild when the bay freezes over. It is the subject of a poem, Churchill Bear Jail, written by Salish Chief Victor A. Charlo.

==== Beluga whales ====
Thousands of beluga whales, which move into the warmer waters of the Churchill River estuary during July and August to calf, are a significant summer attraction. Polar bears are present as well and can sometimes be seen from boat tours at this time of year.

==== Birds ====
Churchill is also a destination for birdwatching from late May until August; normally, 175 species are found there. Birders have recorded more than 270 species within a 40 km (25 mi) radius of Churchill, including snowy owl, tundra swan, American golden plover and gyrfalcon. More than 100 birds, including parasitic jaeger, Smith's longspur, stilt sandpiper, and Harris's sparrow nest there. Other birds that are seen around Churchill, but less often, include the northern hawk-owl, three-toed woodpecker and the Ross's gull.

=== Health care ===
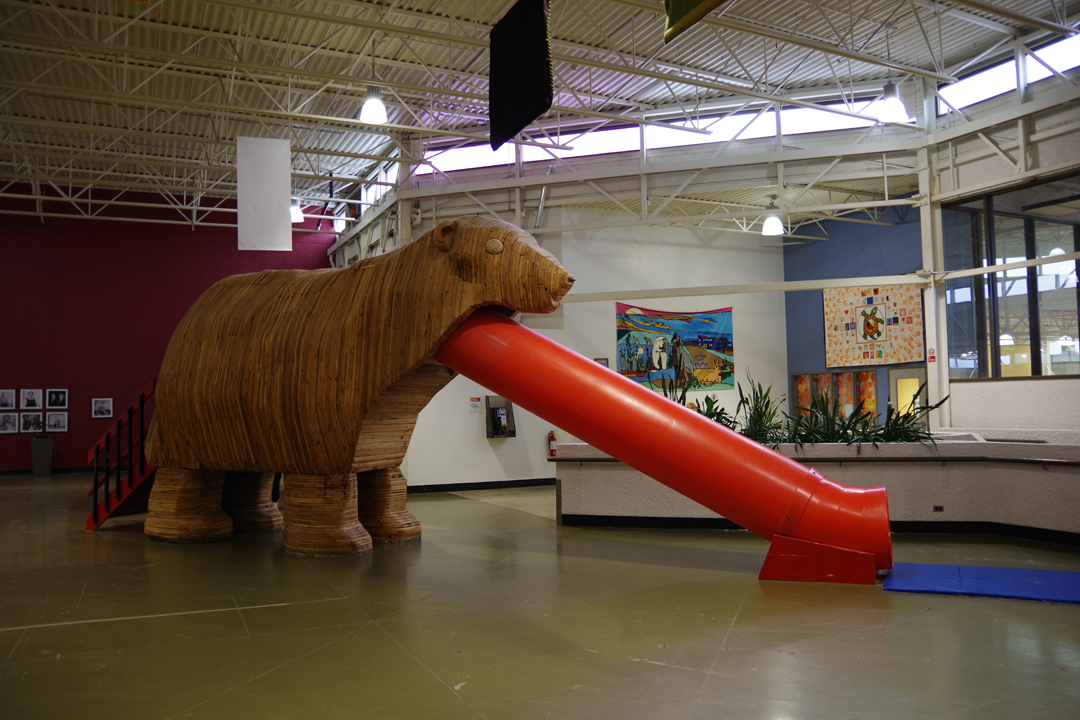
Town centre complex

The town has a modern health centre, operated by the Winnipeg Regional Health Authority, which employs about 129 people, including six doctors and eighteen nurses. It provides 21 acute care beds, dental care and diagnostic laboratories to service the residents of Churchill and the regions of Nunavut.

=== Arctic research ===
==== Churchill Northern Studies Centre ====
The Churchill Northern Studies Centre is a non-profit research and education facility 23 km (14 mi) east of the town of Churchill. It provides accommodations, meals, equipment rentals, and logistical support to scientific researchers who work on a diverse range of topics of interest to northern science.

==== Churchill Marine Observatory ====
The Churchill Marine Observatory (CMO), operated by the University of Manitoba, was constructed with federal funds beginning in 2015. The observatory became operational in December 2021. It facilitates studies to address technological, scientific and economic issues pertaining to Arctic oil spills, gas exploration, and other contaminants. The facility is located in the Churchill River estuary, and consists of two saltwater sub-pools designed to simultaneously accommodate contaminated and control experiments on various scenarios of the behaviour of oil spills in sea ice. The concrete pools are equipped with a movable fabric roof to control snow cover and ice growth, and various sensors and instruments to allow real-time monitoring. The project is estimated to cost about $32 million.

== Transportation ==
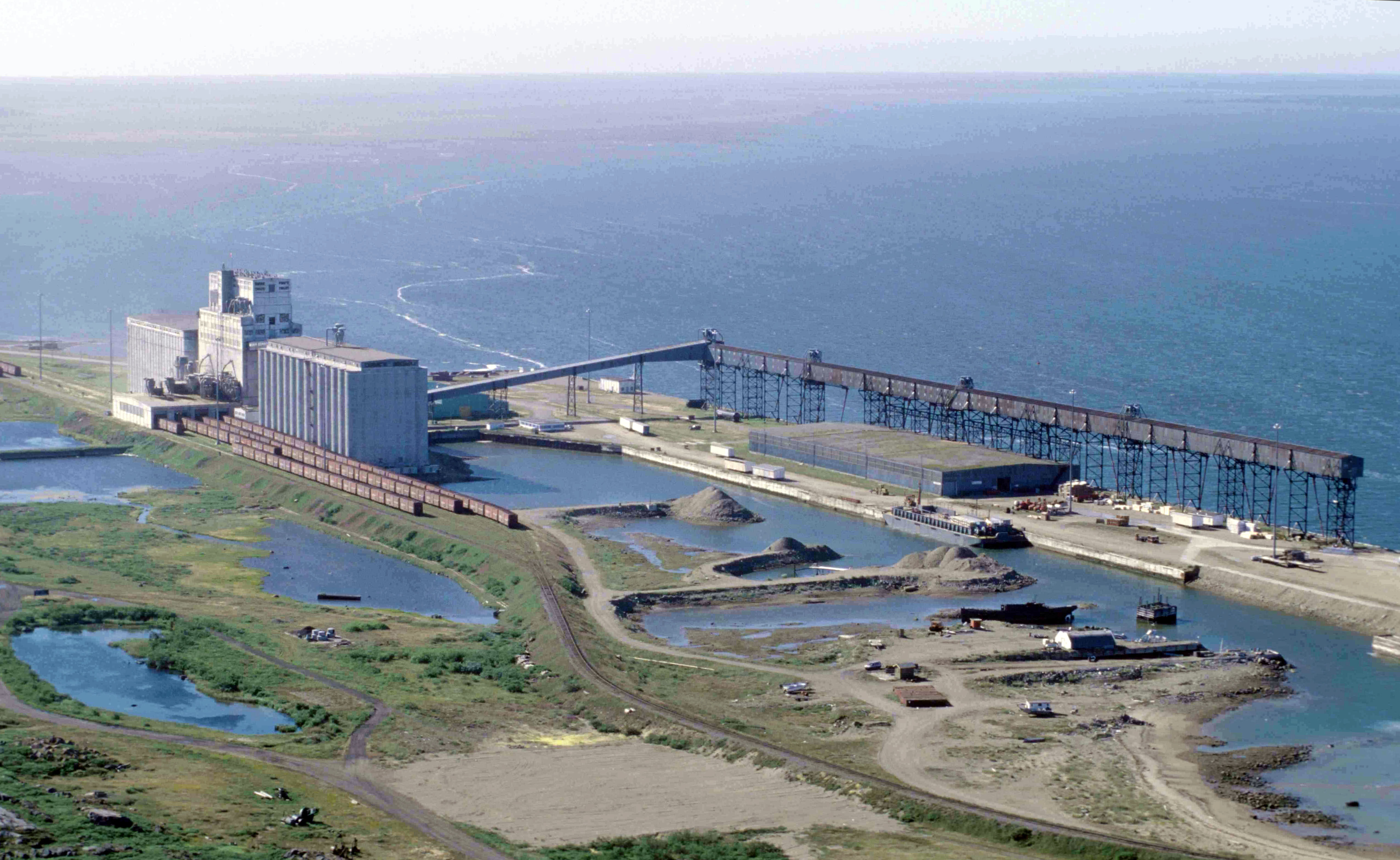
Port of Churchill

Churchill Airport, formerly a United States and Canadian military base, is serviced by Calm Air operating scheduled flights connecting Churchill to Winnipeg.

The privately owned Port of Churchill is Canada's principal seaport on the Arctic Ocean. The port was originally constructed by the government in the 1930s, although the idea of building such an Arctic deep-water port originated in the 19th century. It is the only Arctic Ocean seaport connected to the North American railway grid. The port is capable of servicing Panamax vessels. The presence of ice on Hudson Bay restricts navigation from mid-autumn to mid-summer. Churchill experiences the highest tides in Hudson Bay. The Churchill estuary has a narrow entrance, and ships planning to moor at the port have to execute a relatively tight 100-degree turn. Maritime transportation companies, Nunavut Sealink and Supply (NSSI) as Groupe Desgagnés, and Nunavut Eastern Arctic Sealink (NEAS) both have bases in Churchill and provide sealift to Nunavik and all Nunavut communities. The port was used for the export of Canadian grain to European markets, with rail-sea connections made at Churchill.

There are no roads from Churchill that connect to the Canadian highway network. The only overland route connecting Churchill to the rest of Canada is the Hudson Bay Railway, formerly part of the Canadian National Railway (CN) network, which connects the Port of Churchill and the town's railway station to CN's rail line at The Pas. The Winnipeg–Churchill train, operated by Via Rail, provides passenger service between Churchill station in downtown Churchill and Union Station in downtown Winnipeg twice per week and from The Pas once per week. The 1,700 km (1,100 mi) journey from Winnipeg takes approximately 40 hours, and services many smaller communities in northern Manitoba and eastern Saskatchewan.

In 1997, the railway line and port were sold by the Canadian government to the American railway-holding company OmniTRAX. The government of Manitoba proposed in 2010 that the Port of Churchill could serve as an "Arctic gateway," accepting container ships from Asia whose containers would then be transported south by rail to major destinations in North America. Churchill has been used to transship grain since 1929. In October 2012, the Financial Post reported that due to delays in the approval of several new pipelines from Alberta's oil fields, oil industry planners were considering shipping oil by rail to Churchill, for loading on panamax oil tankers. Under this plan icebreakers would extend the shipping season. In July 2016, OmniTRAX announced the closure of the Port of Churchill and the end of daily rail freight service to the port. Weekly freight service to the town remained until May 2017, when floods washed out the track.

In 2018, the Port of Churchill, the Hudson Bay Railway, and the Churchill Marine Tank Farm were purchased by Arctic Gateway Group, a public-private partnership that includes Missinippi Rail LP (a consortium of First Nations and local governments), Fairfax Financial and AGT Food and Ingredients. The group engaged Cando Rail Services and Paradox Access Solutions to repair the flood damage. On 1 November 2018, Prime Minister Justin Trudeau joined Churchill residents to celebrate the resumption of rail freight service to the town. Regular freight shipments resumed in late November and passenger service in early December 2018.

== Demographics ==
Historical population
Year	Pop.	±%
1941	231	—
1951	830	+259.3%
1956	1,178	+41.9%
1961	1,878	+59.4%
1966	1,689	−10.1%
1971	1,604	−5.0%
1976	1,699	+5.9%
1981	1,304	−23.2%
1986	1,217	−6.7%
1991	1,143	−6.1%
1996	1,089	−4.7%
2001	963	−11.6%
2006	923	−4.2%
2011	813	−11.9%
2016	899	+10.6%
2021	870	−3.2%

In the 2021 Canadian census conducted by Statistics Canada, Churchill had a population of 870 living in 389 of its 540 total private dwellings, a change of −3.2% from its 2016 population of 899. With a land area of 50.83 km^{2} (19.63 sq mi), it had a population density of 17.1/km^{2} in 2021.

As of the 2021 Canada Census, just over 56 percent of the population is Indigenous, and the rest (43 percent) are non-native. Of the Indigenous population, there were 345 First Nations (69 percent), 80 Métis (16 percent), 25 Inuit (5 percent) and 35 people (7 percent) had multiple Indigenous ancestry.

The non-native population is mainly of European descent, although a small number of Black Canadians (2.3%) and Latin Americans (1%) also reside in Churchill.

English is the most commonly spoken language, followed by Cree, Inuktitut, French and Dene.

== Attractions ==
The town has a modern multiplex centre housing a cinema, cafeteria, public library, hospital, health centre, daycare, swimming pool, ice hockey rink, indoor playground, gym, curling rinks and basketball courts. Nearby is the Itsanitaq Museum, operated by the Diocese of Churchill-Baie d'Hudson, with over 850 high quality Inuit carvings on permanent display. The exhibits include historical and contemporary sculptures of stone, bone, and ivory, as well as archaeological and wildlife specimens. The Parks Canada visitor centre also has artifacts on display and makes use of audiovisual presentations of various topics involving the region's natural and archaeological history.

By the late 1980s, both the local government and Parks Canada had successfully educated its population on polar bear safety, significantly reducing lethal confrontations and fuelling ecotourism such that both the community and the polar bears benefited.

== Local media ==
=== Radio ===
- CHFC 1230 AM – CBC Radio One and the station repeats CBWK-FM from Thompson. CBC news anchor Peter Mansbridge got his start here.
- VF2312 96.9 FM – Native Communications

=== Newspapers ===
Churchill has a newspaper called The Hudson Bay Post. It is a monthly newspaper "published occasionally," according to the front page.

In the late 1950s, the first local paper, the weekly Churchill Observer, was produced by an avocational journalist, Jack Rogers, at Defence Research Northern Laboratories (DRNL) and continued for some years even after his departure. Later another small paper, the Taiga Times, was published for a few years.

== Notable people ==
- Susan Aglukark, singer
- Jean-François de Galaup, comte de Lapérouse
- Samuel Hearne, explorer
- Joseph Lofthouse, an Anglican bishop
- Peter Mansbridge, Canadian broadcaster and news anchor
- Jens Munk, Danish explorer
- Doreen Patterson Reitsma, served a term at the Naval Radio Station
- Doreen Redhead, Manitoba Provincial Court Judge
- Tatannuaq, Inuk interpreter
- David Thompson, explorer
- Jordin Tootoo, NHL player

== See also ==
- Arctic Bridge
- Churchill—Keewatinook Aski
- Churchill (provincial electoral district)
- Churchill Water Aerodrome
- Keewatinook
- Sayisi Dene
