= December 2022 European ice storm =

Meteorological history
- Formed: 18 December 2022
- Dissipated: 20 December 2022

Ice Storm

Overall effects
- Fatalities: 5
- Injuries: 1560+
- Areas affected: Europe

Between December 18–20, 2022, a deadly ice storm impacted numerous countries in Europe, causing 1,560 injuries and five fatalities.

== Impacts ==
=== Netherlands and Belgium ===
Around 17:00 UTC on December 18, freezing rain began in Belgium and the Netherlands. Several car crashes occurred in both countries, resulting in three injuries and one fatality.

=== Germany ===
Starting around 22:00 UTC on December 18, the ice storm began to impact Germany. By the end of December 18, hundreds of car accidents had occurred in the North Rhine-Westphalia region of Germany, with 90 alone in Cologne. These car accidents resulted in eight injuries.

== See also ==
- Weather of 2022
