= Polar bear jail =

Holding facility for polar bears in Churchill, Manitoba, Canada

Polar Bear Holding Facility
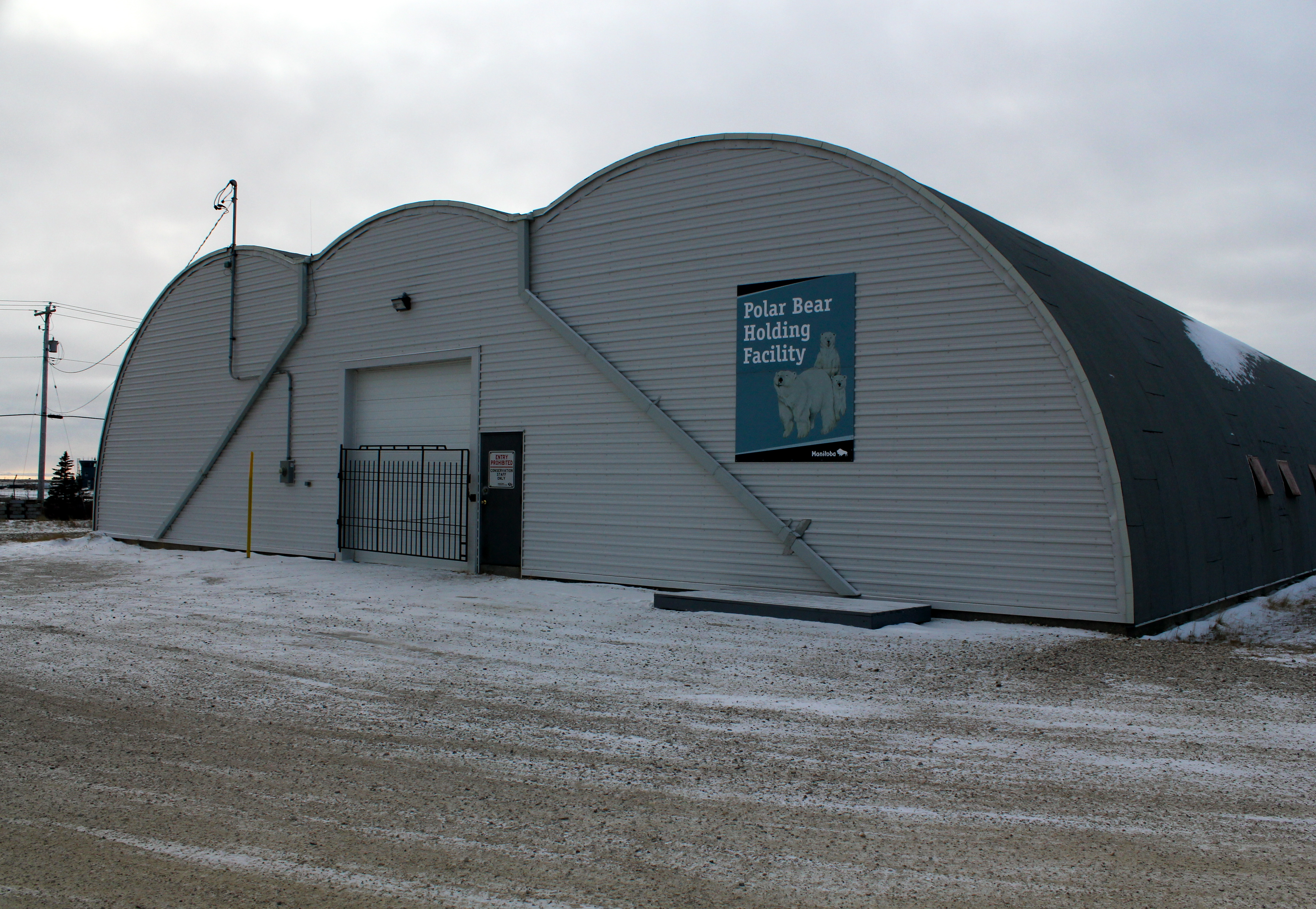
- The Polar Bear Holding Facility, November 2011

- Location within Manitoba

General information
- Type: Animal Control Facility
- Location: Churchill, Manitoba, Canada
- Coordinates: 58°45′11.8″N 94°04′32.9″W

The Polar Bear Holding Facility, colloquially known as the Polar Bear Jail, is a special building in Churchill, Manitoba, Canada, where polar bears that are considered troublesome or dangerous are isolated until they can be relocated. Before the facility was established, polar bears which were considered dangerous were shot. The jail was established in 1982 or in 1983, after a person on the street was mauled by a bear. The facility is the subject of the poem "Churchill Bear Jail" by Salish Chief Victor A. Charlo.

== Keeping the animals ==
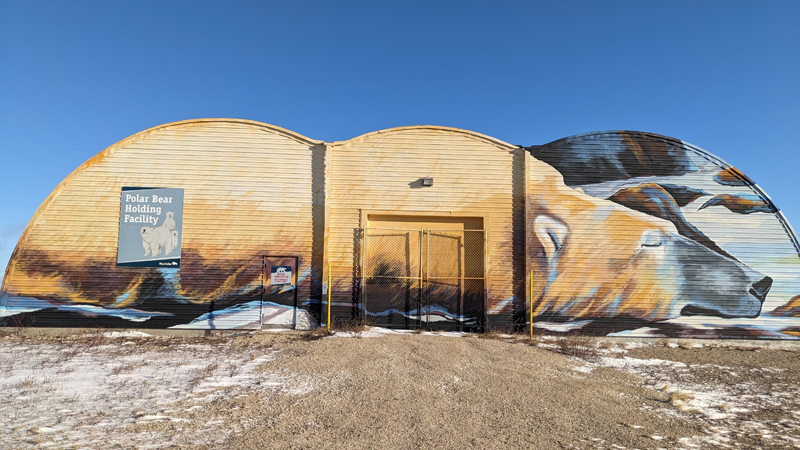
Mural of Cedric on the building

The polar bear jail was established in either 1982 or 1983, after someone was attacked by a polar bear on the streets. Before the jail was established, polar bears were shot and killed. Initially, the facility had 20 cells, which could hold 16 single bears and four family groups. The bears could be held from two to 30 days – if a bear had been captured repeatedly, the term may have been extended. The premise is that extended captivity would create a sense of danger for the bears so that they will be reluctant to approach the town. The bears are not fed during the captivity. Since the bears' natural life cycle involves long periods of fasting, their bodies are adapted to going without food for an extended time.

Dangerous bears are tranquilized when captured and are marked with a bright paint on the neck. Closer to the winter, when the ice in the Hudson Bay has set, the bears are released. They are tranquilized again and transported by helicopter far from the town.

In 2014, the jail was extended to 28 cells. The inhabitants of Churchill still have to be careful outside, as the outskirts of the city are said to be visited by about a thousand polar bears in the summer.

There are signs cautioning "Polar Bear Alert" on the shores of the Hudson Bay and Churchill River, and anyone that spots a polar bear can call a designated phone number, upon which some workers of the Department of Natural Resources will come out to catch the bear.
