= Ice storm =

Weather event characterized by freezing rain

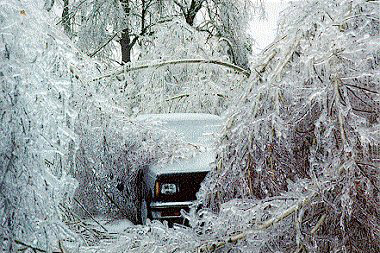
Devastation caused by an ice storm

An ice storm, also known as a glaze event or a silver storm, is a type of winter storm characterized by freezing rain. The U.S. National Weather Service defines an ice storm as a storm which results in the accumulation of at least 0.25-inch (6.4 mm) of ice on exposed surfaces. They are generally not violent storms but instead are commonly perceived as gentle rains occurring at temperatures just below freezing.

== Formation ==
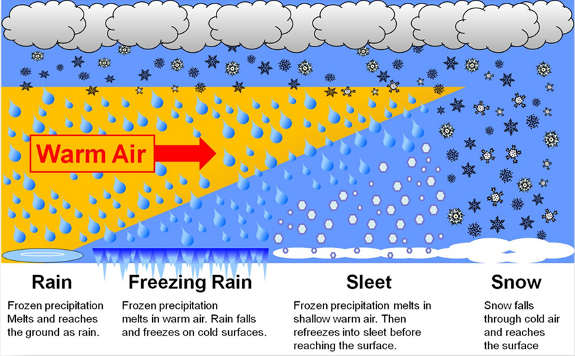
A graph showing the formation of different kinds of precipitation.

The formation of ice begins with a layer of above-freezing air above a layer of sub-freezing temperatures closer to the surface. Frozen precipitation melts to rain while falling into the warm air layer, and then begins to refreeze in the cold layer below. If the precipitate refreezes while still in the air, it will land on the ground as sleet. Alternatively, the liquid droplets can continue to fall without freezing, passing through the cold air just above the surface. This thin layer of air then cools the rain to a temperature below freezing (0 °C or 32 °F). However, the drops themselves do not freeze, a phenomenon called supercooling (or forming "supercooled drops"). When the supercooled drops strike ground or anything else below 0 °C (32 °F) (e.g. power lines, tree branches, aircraft), a layer of ice accumulates as the cold water drips off, forming a slowly thickening film of ice, hence freezing rain.

While meteorologists can predict when and where an ice storm will occur, some storms still occur with little or no warning. In the United States, most ice storms occur in the northeastern region, but damaging storms have occurred farther south; an ice storm in February 1994 resulted in tremendous ice accumulation as far south as Mississippi, and caused reported damage in nine states.

== Effect ==
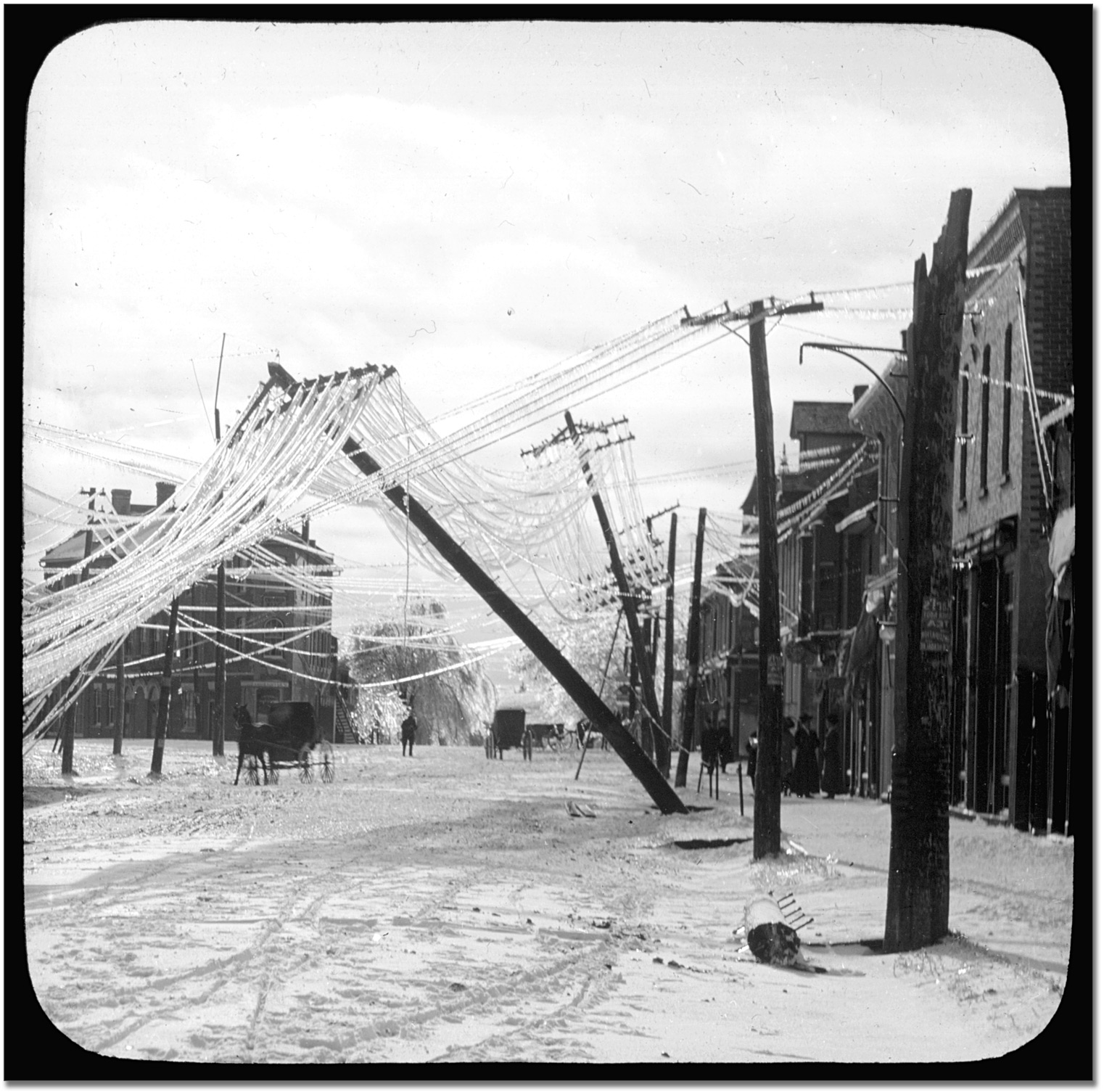
Power lines and groups pulled down after an ice storm. Besides disrupting transportation, ice storms can disrupt utilities by snapping lines and poles.

The freezing rain from an ice storm covers everything with heavy, smooth glaze ice. In addition to hazardous driving or walking conditions, branches or even whole trees may break from the weight of ice. Falling branches can block roads, tear down power and telephone lines, and cause other damage. Even without falling trees and tree branches, the weight of the ice itself can easily snap power lines and also break and bring down power/utility poles; even electricity pylons with steel frames. This can leave people without power for anywhere from several days to a month. According to most meteorologists, just 0.25-inch (6.4 mm) of ice accumulation can add about 500 pounds (230 kg) of weight per line span. Damage from ice storms is easily capable of shutting down entire metropolitan areas.

Additionally, the loss of power during ice storms has indirectly caused numerous illnesses and deaths due to unintentional carbon monoxide (CO) poisoning. At lower levels, CO poisoning causes symptoms such as nausea, dizziness, fatigue, and headache, but high levels can cause unconsciousness, heart failure, and death. The relatively high incidence of CO poisoning during ice storms occurs due to the use of alternative methods of heating and cooking during prolonged power outages, common after severe ice storms. Gas generators, charcoal and propane barbecues, and kerosene heaters contribute to CO poisoning when they operate in confined locations. CO is produced when appliances burn fuel without enough oxygen present, such as basements and other indoor locations.

Loss of electricity during ice storms can indirectly lead to hypothermia and result in death. It can also lead to ruptured pipes due to water freezing inside the pipes.

== Gallery ==
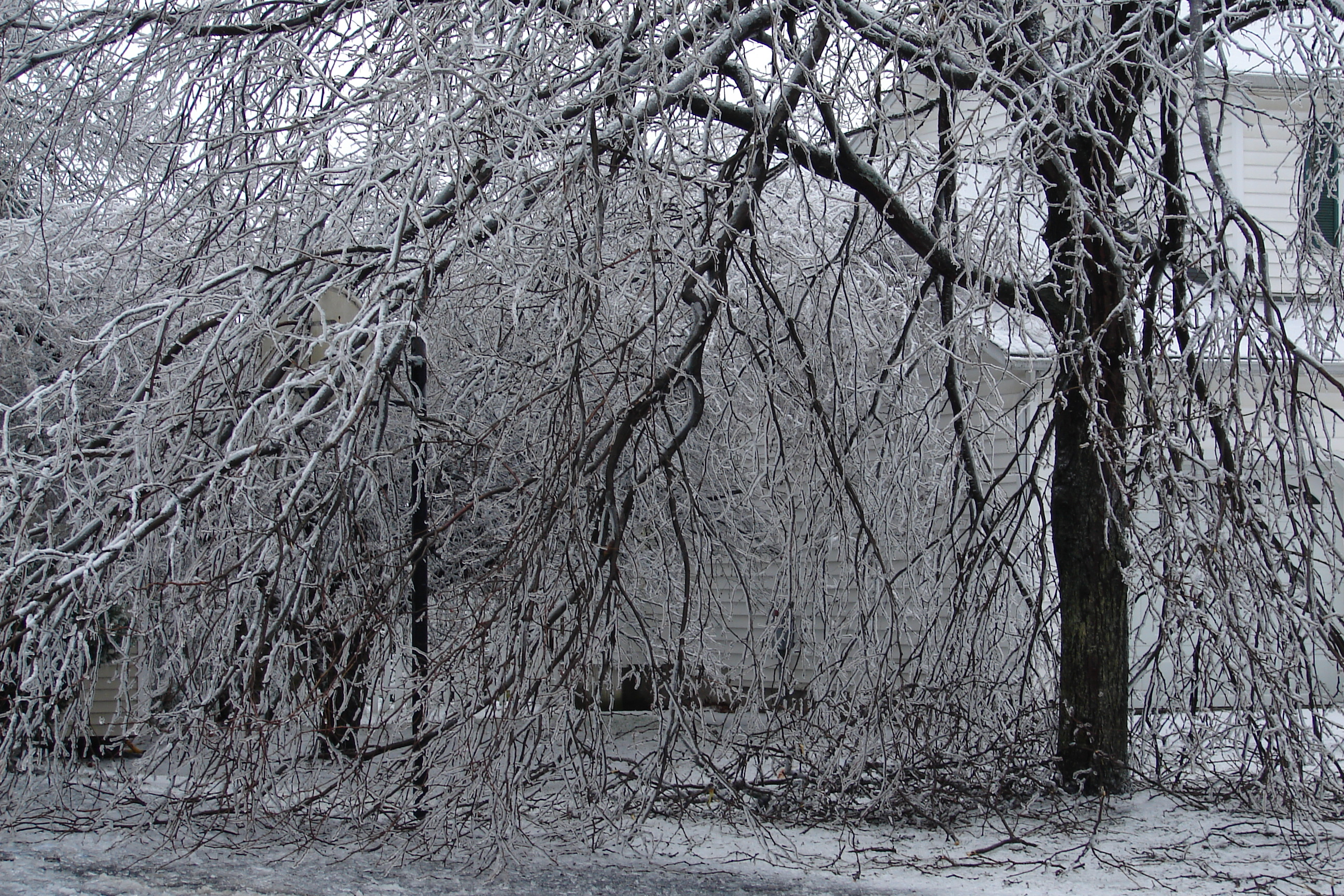
A tree covered in ice

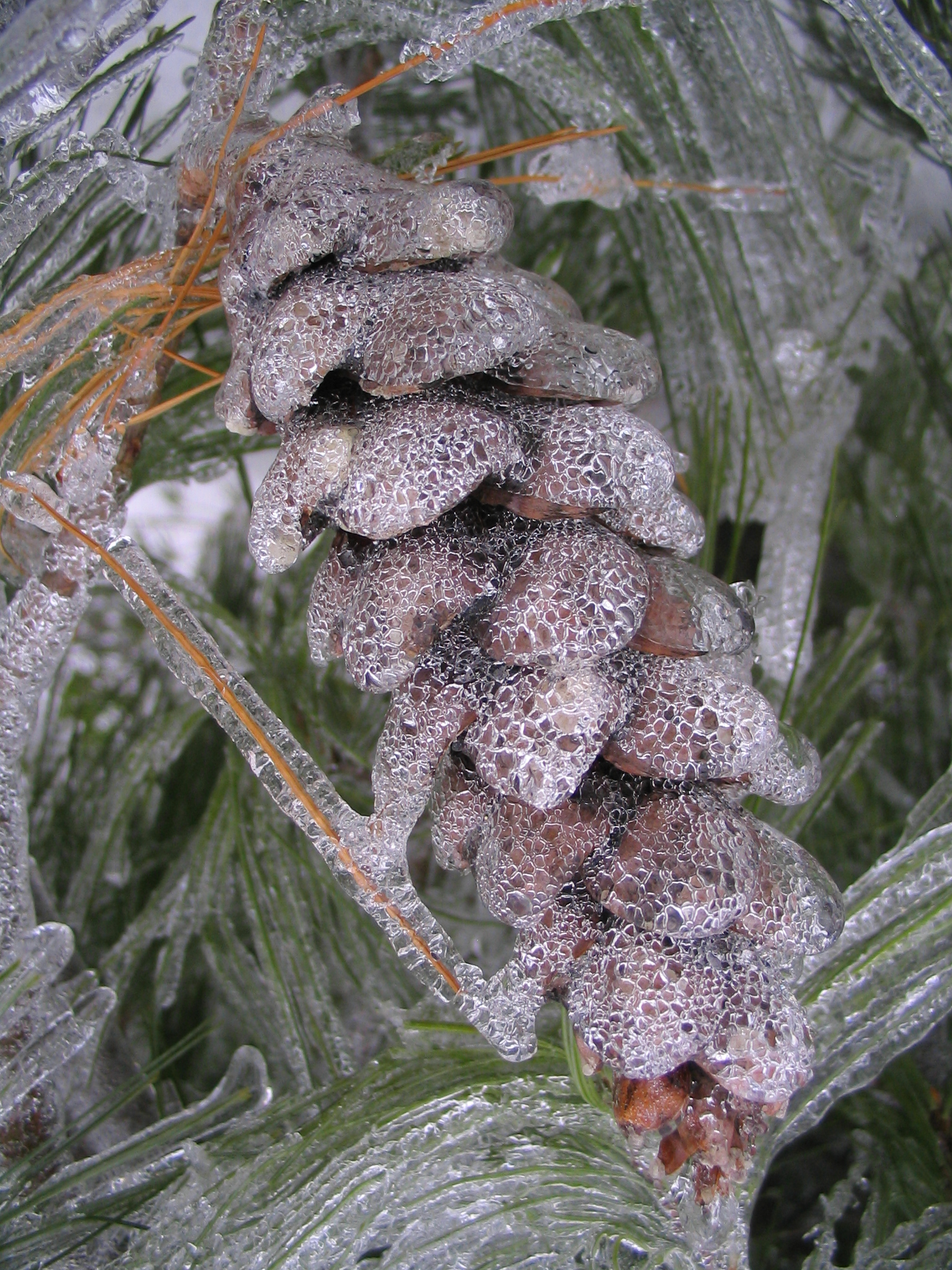
Detail of a pinecone covered in ice

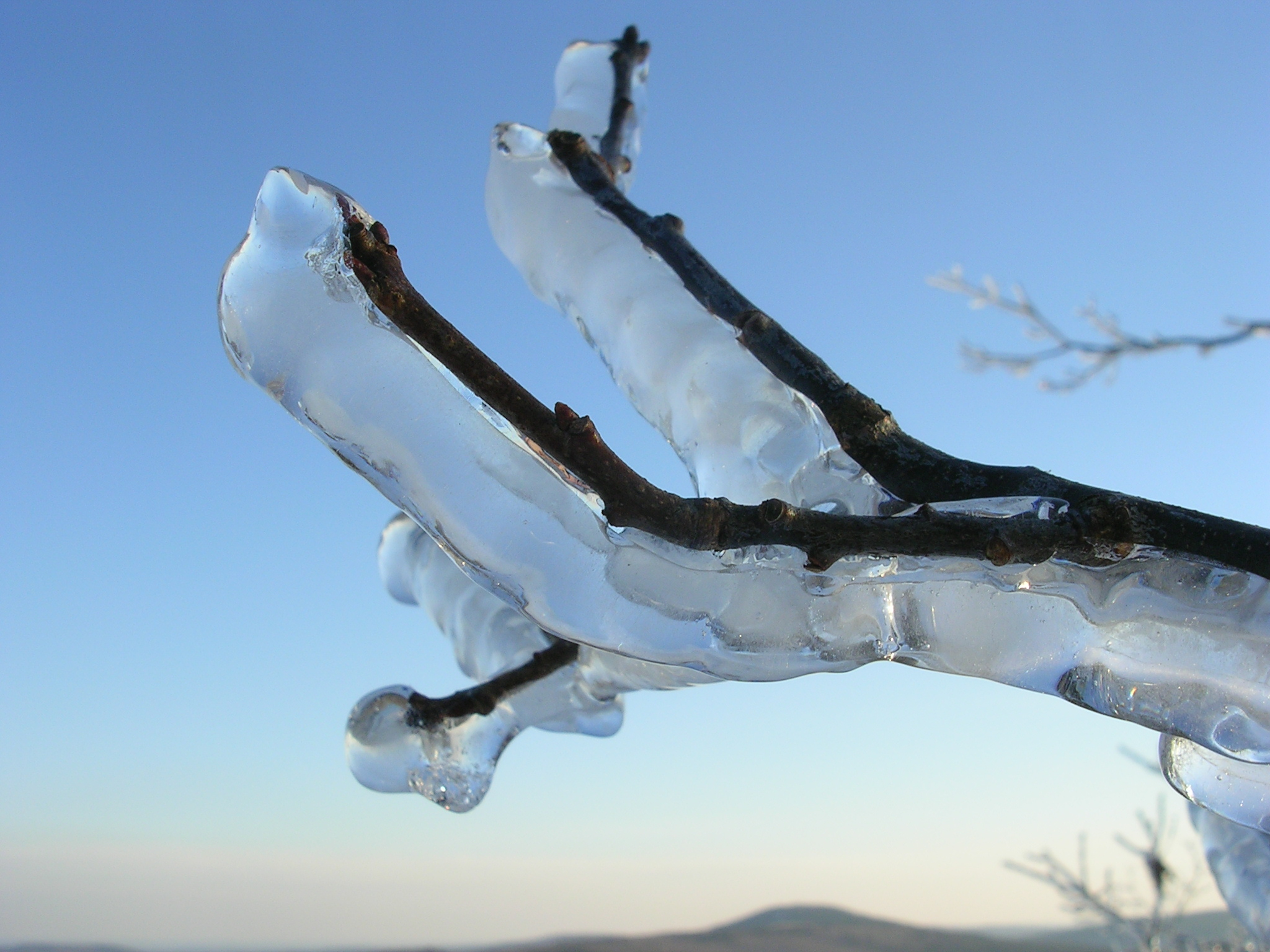
A buildup of ice on a branch after an ice storm

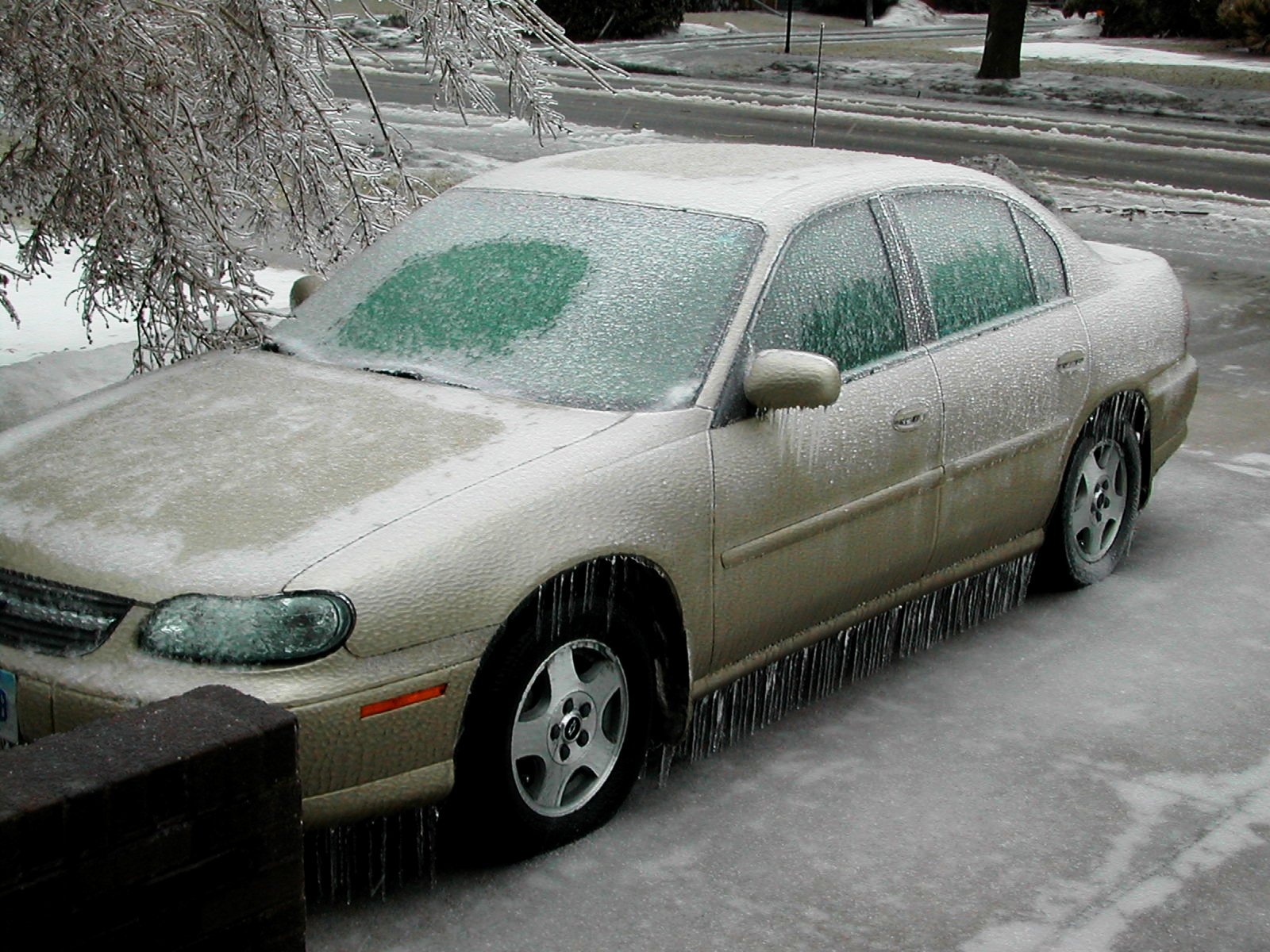
Car after an ice storm

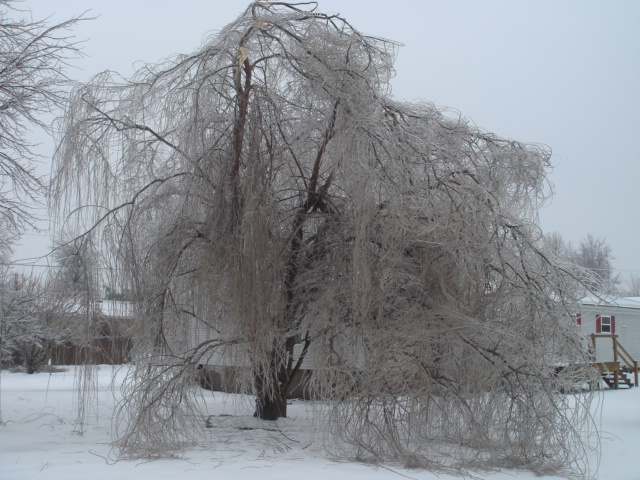
A weeping willow tree damaged by an ice storm

== See also ==
- Freezing rain
- Ice pruning
- List of ice storms
- Power outage
- Sperry–Piltz Ice Accumulation Index
