= The Hudson Bay Post =

Canadian newspaper

- Type: Monthly newspaper
- City: Churchill, Manitoba
- Country: Canada

The Hudson Bay Post is a monthly newspaper. It is the only newspaper in Churchill, Manitoba. It is available in Churchill, Thompson, and Winnipeg.
