= Itsanitaq Museum =

- Former name: Eskimo Museum
- Established: 1944
- Location: Churchill, Canada
- Coordinates: 58.770421°N 94.166910°W
- Type: Ethnographic museum

The Itsanitaq Museum is a museum located in Churchill, Canada dedicated to Inuit culture.

== History ==
The intention with the creation of this museum was by Catholic missionaries to preserve the various artifacts of the native people of the northern part of Canada in 1944. The museum was founded by Jacques Volant, who held the position of curator until 1987.

== Collections ==
The museum contains some 1,300 items dating from the 1930s to the present day including sculptures, artwork, tools used by the natives of this area of Canada. Some artifacts are made of stone, whale bone or ivory. The museum has exhibits about the Dorset and Thule cultures. Among the Inuit-related exhibits are antique weapons, hunting equipment and wooden kayaks designed to navigate the Arctic Ocean. The museum also has exhibits on Arctic wildlife including animals such as Polar Bears, Muskox and Walrus. The museum has a section of books about the animals that inhabit the Arctic. The museum also preserves archaeological remains.

== Gallery ==
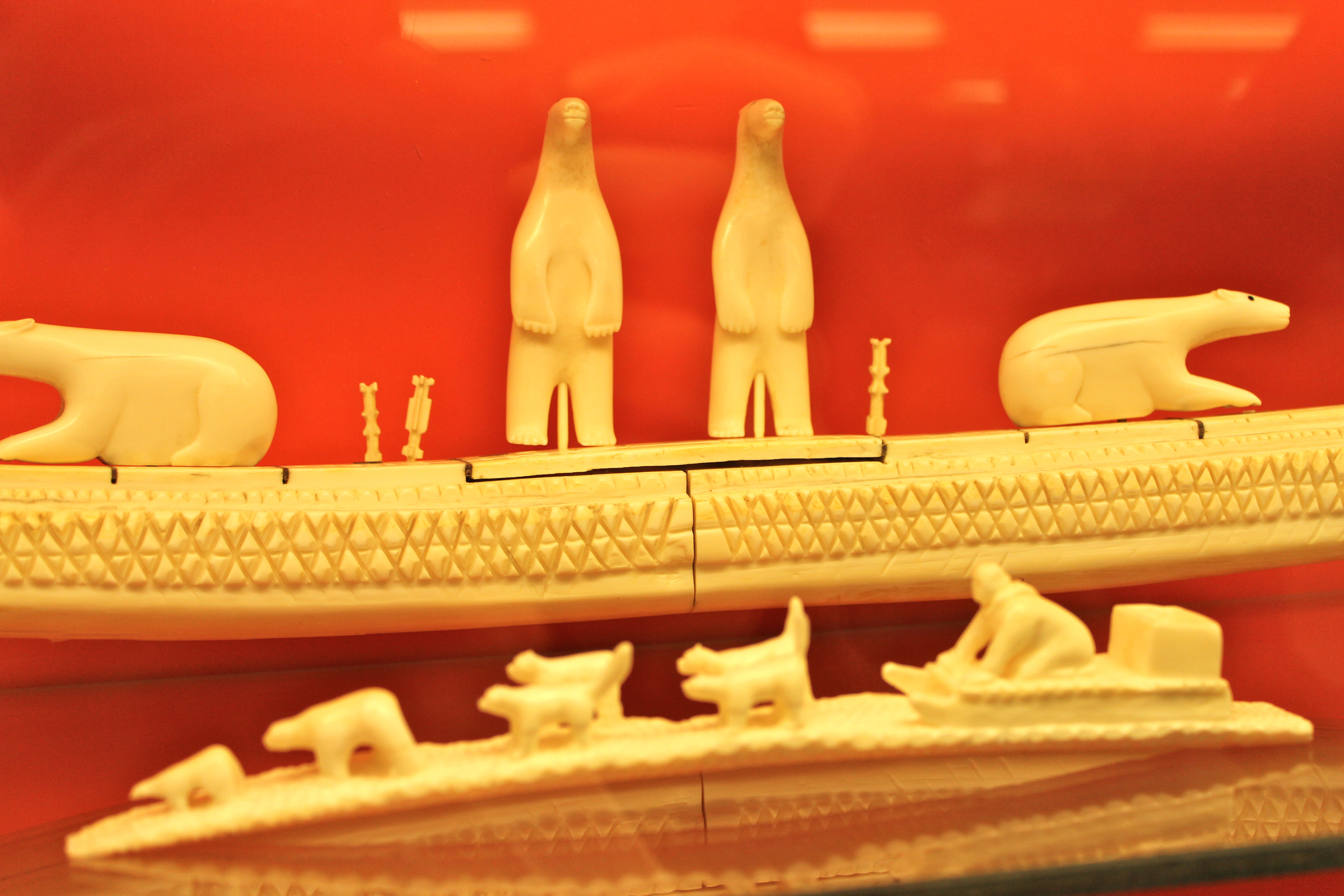

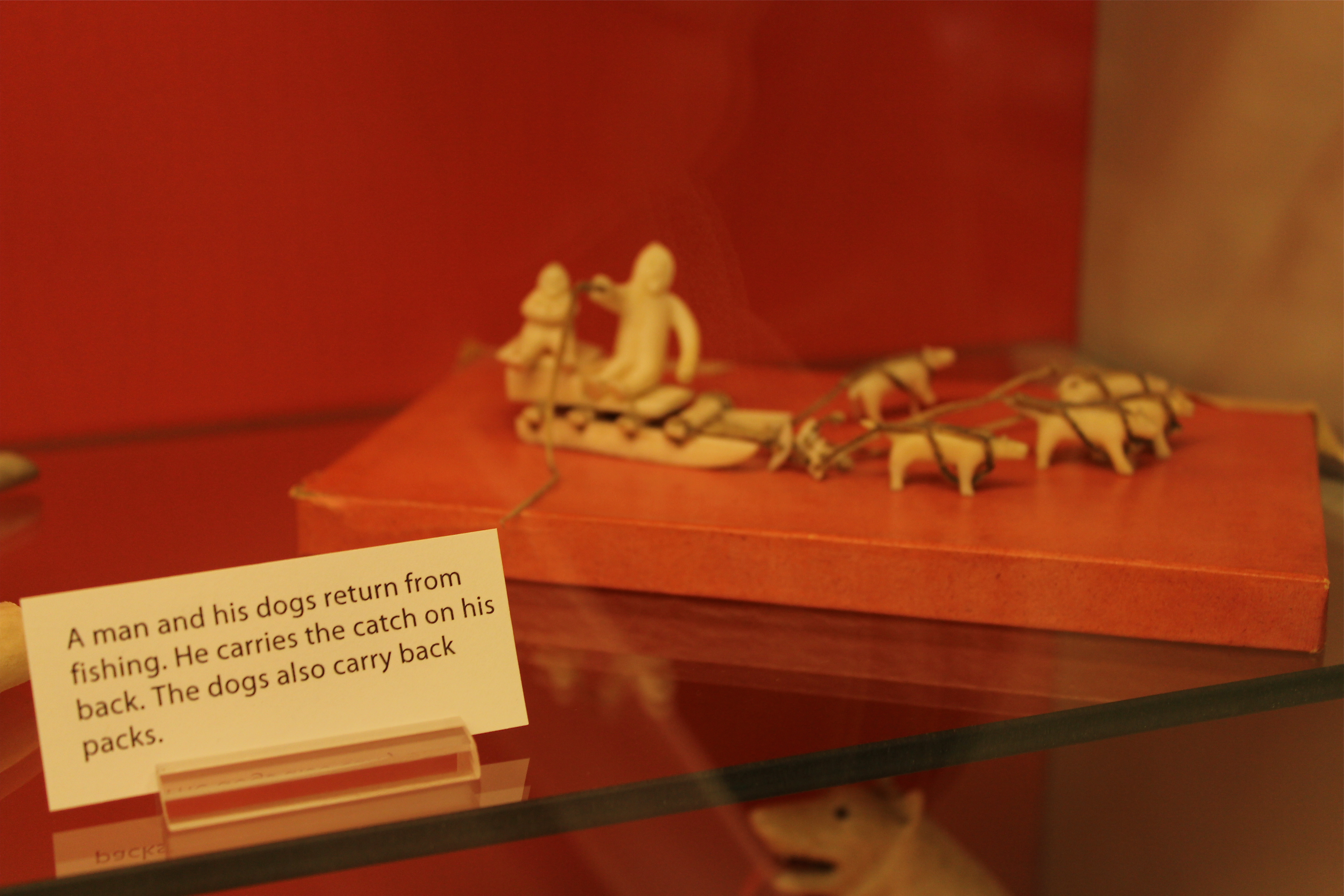

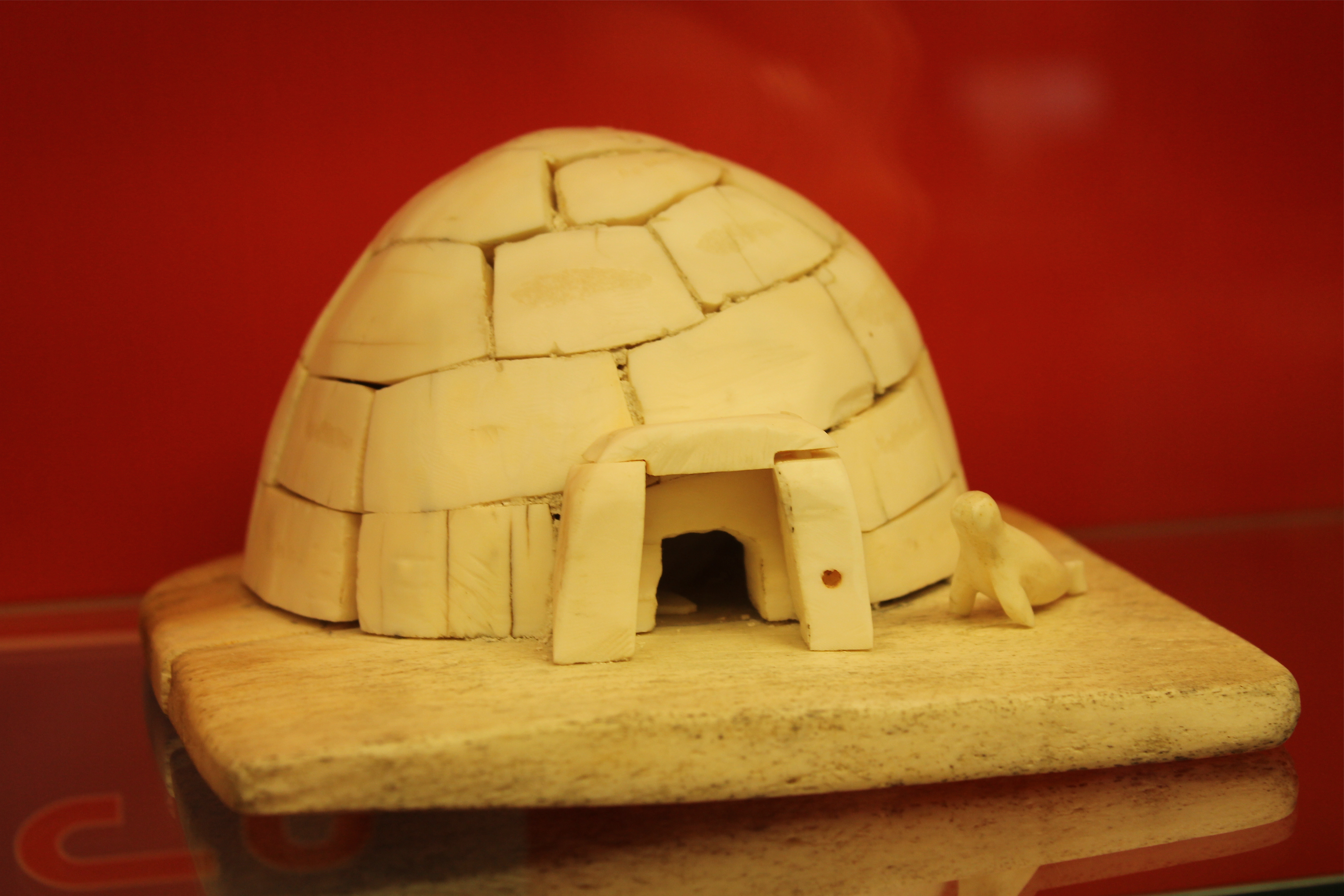

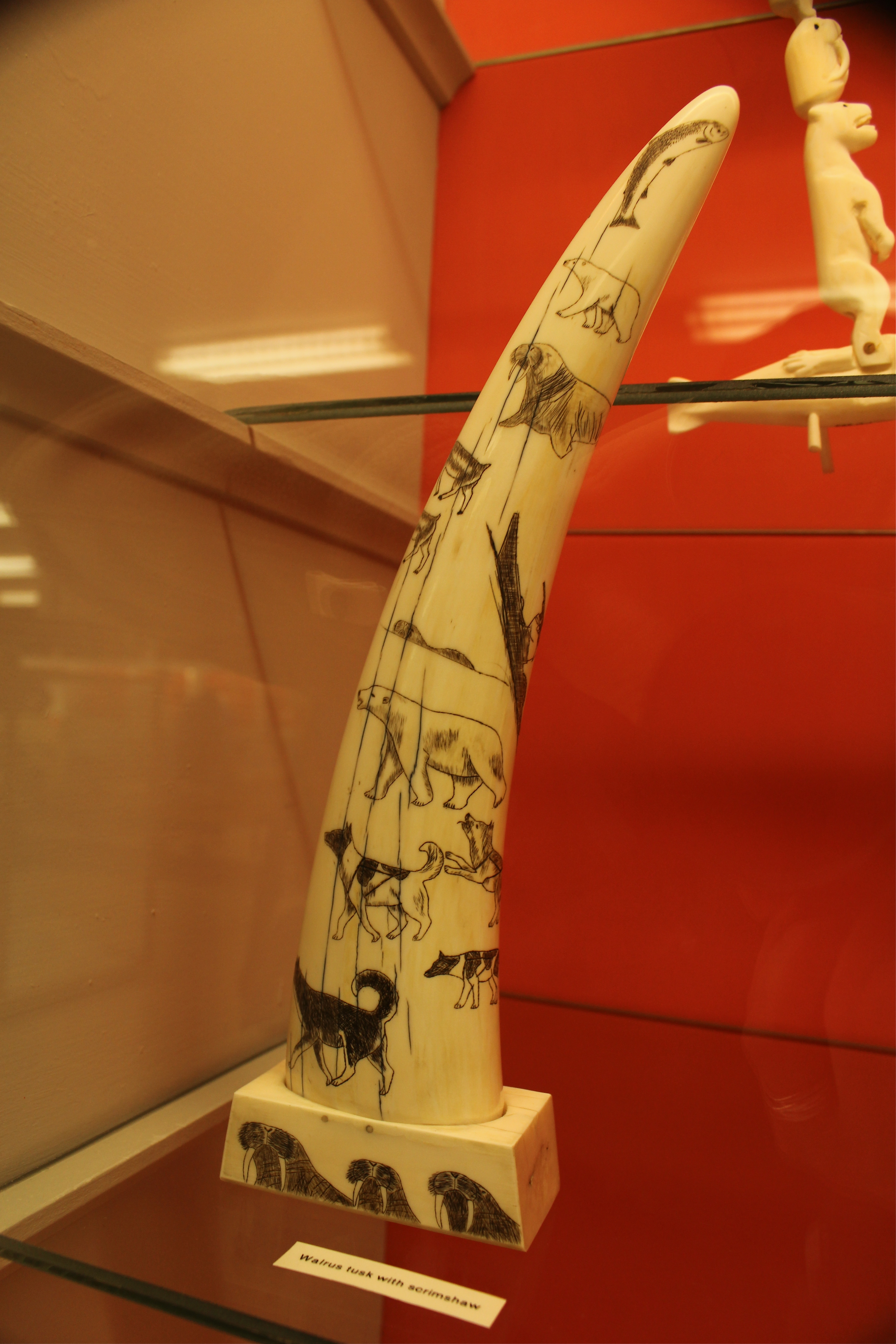
