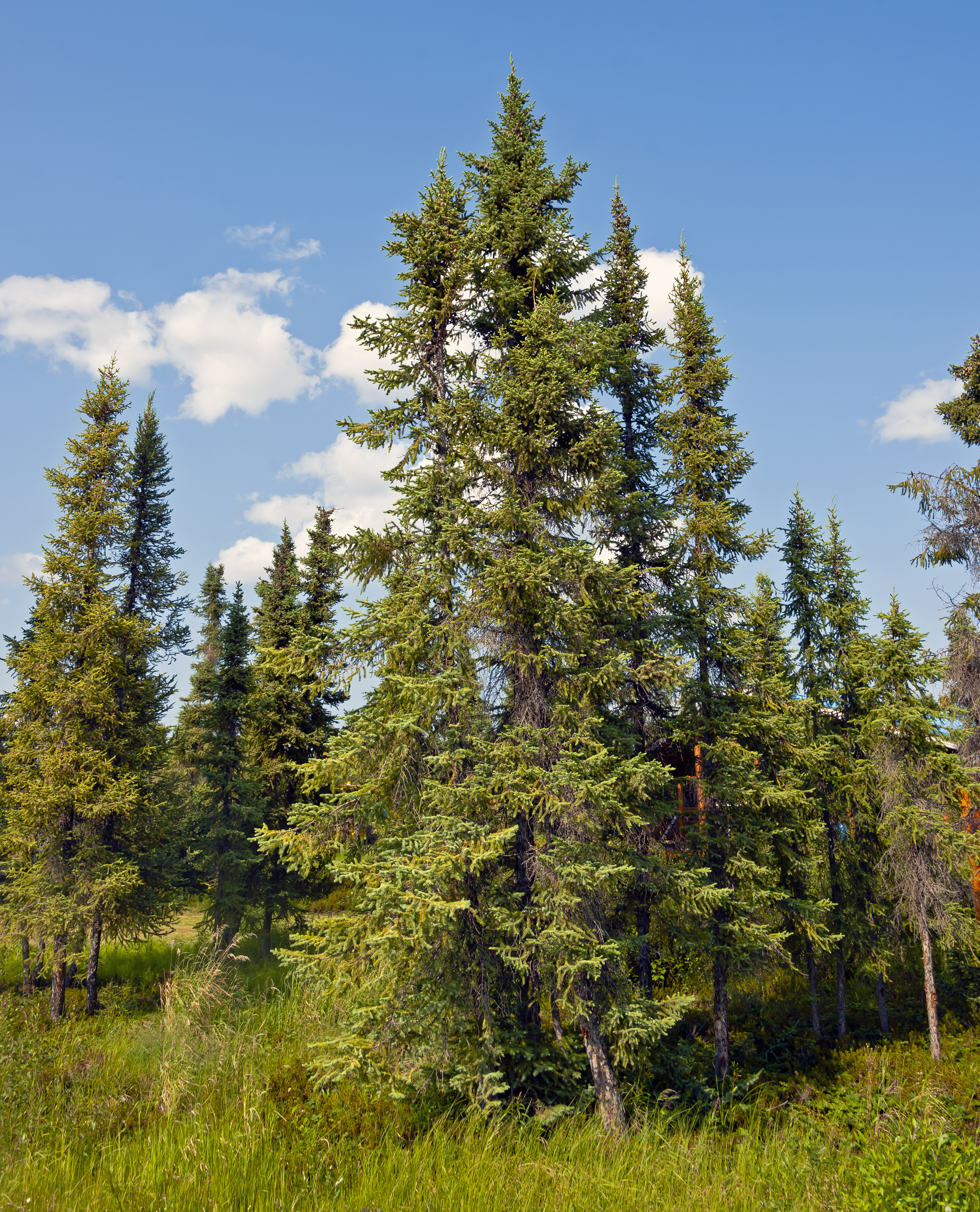
- Stand of black spruce near Inuvik, Northwest Territories, Canada

Conservation status
- Least Concern (IUCN 3.1)

Scientific classification
- Kingdom: Plantae
- Clade: Tracheophytes
- Clade: Gymnospermae
- Division: Pinophyta
- Class: Pinopsida
- Order: Pinales
- Family: Pinaceae
- Genus: Picea
- Species: P. mariana

Binomial name
- Picea mariana (Mill.) Britton, Sterns & Poggenburg
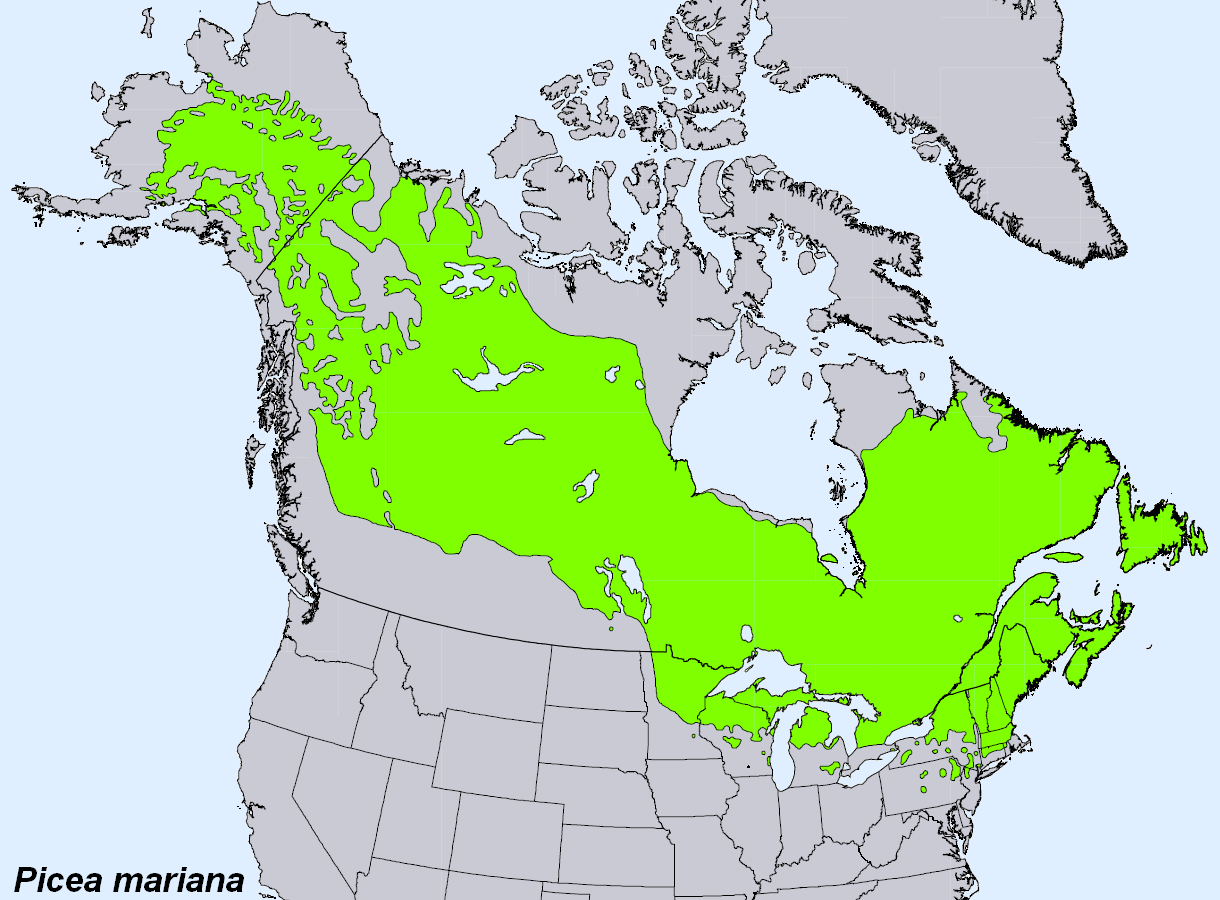

Synonyms
- Synonymy: Abies denticulata Michx.; Abies mariana Mill.; Abies nigra (Castigl.) Du Roi; Peuce rubra Rich.; Picea brevifolia Peck; Picea ericoides Bean; Picea nigra (Du Roi) Link; Pinus denticulata (Michx) Muhl.; Pinus mariana (Mill.) Du Roi; Pinus marylandica Antoine; Pinus nigra Aiton 1789 not J.F. Arnold 1785

= Picea mariana =

Black spruce

North American species of spruce tree

Picea mariana, the black spruce, is a North American species of spruce tree in the pine family. It is widespread across Canada, found in all 10 provinces and all 3 territories. It is the official tree of Newfoundland and Labrador and is that province's most abundant tree. Its range extends into northern parts of the United States: in Alaska, the Great Lakes region, and the upper Northeast. It is a frequent part of the biome known as taiga or boreal forest.

The Latin specific epithet mariana means "of the Virgin Mary".

== Description ==
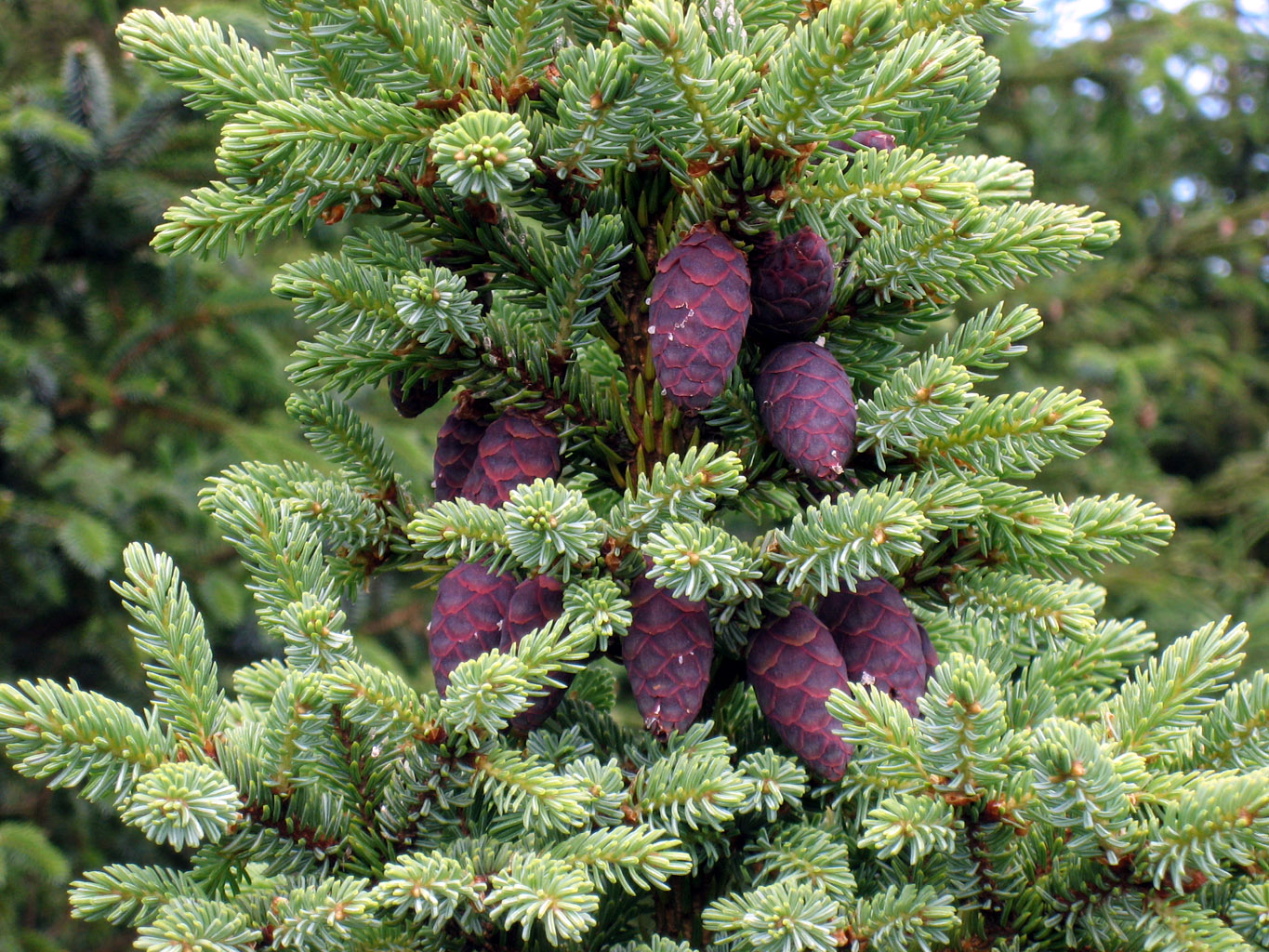
Needles and young cones

P. mariana is a slow-growing, small upright evergreen coniferous tree (rarely a shrub), having a straight trunk with little taper, a scruffy habit, and a narrow, pointed crown of short, compact, drooping branches with upturned tips. Through much of its range it averages 5–15 m (15–50 ft) tall with a trunk 15–50 cm (6–20 in) diameter at maturity, though occasional specimens can reach 30 m (98 ft) tall and 60 cm (24 in) diameter. The bark is thin, scaly, and greyish brown. The leaves are needle-like, 6–15 mm (1/4–9/16 in) long, stiff, four-sided, dark bluish green on the upper sides, paler glaucous green below. The cones are the smallest of all of the spruces, 1.5–4 cm (1/2–1 1/2 in) long and 1–2 cm (1/2–3/4 in) broad, spindle-shaped to nearly round, dark purple ripening red-brown, produced in dense clusters in the upper crown, opening at maturity but persisting for several years.

Natural hybridization occurs regularly with the closely related P. rubens (red spruce) and very rarely with P. glauca (white spruce). It differs from P. glauca in having a dense cover of small hairs on the bark of young branch tips, an often darker reddish-brown bark, shorter needles, smaller and rounder cones, and a preference for wetter lowland areas. Numerous differences in details of its needle and pollen morphology also exist but require careful microscopic examination to detect. From true firs, such as Abies balsamea (balsam fir), it differs in having pendulous cones, persistent woody leaf-bases, and four-angled needles, arranged all round the shoots.

Due to the large difference between heartwood and sapwood moisture content, it is easy to distinguish these two wood characteristics in ultrasound images, which are widely used as a nondestructive technique to assess the internal condition of the tree and avoid useless log breakdown. Older taxonomic synonyms include A. mariana, P. brevifolia, or P. nigra.

== Ecology ==
Growth varies with site quality. In swamp and muskeg it shows progressively slower growth rates from the edges toward the centre. The roots are shallow and wide spreading, resulting in susceptibility to windthrow. In the northern part of its range, ice pruned asymmetric black spruce are often seen with diminished foliage on the windward side. Tilted trees colloquially called "drunken trees" are associated with thawing of permafrost.

In the southern portion of its range it is found primarily on wet organic soils, but farther north its abundance on uplands increases. In the Great Lakes region it is most abundant in peat bogs and swamps, also on transitional sites between peatlands and uplands. In these areas it is rare on uplands, except in isolated areas of northern Minnesota and the Upper Peninsula of Michigan.

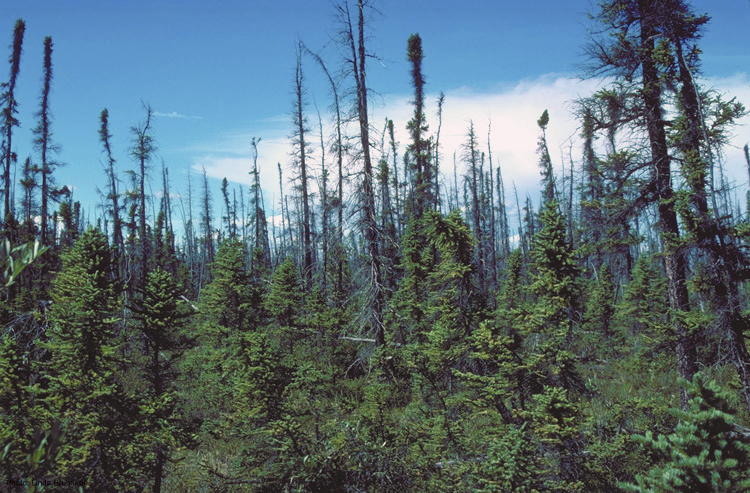
Black spruce taiga, Copper River, Alaska

Most stands are even-aged due to frequent fire intervals in black spruce forests. It commonly grows in pure stands on organic soils and in mixed stands on mineral soils. It is tolerant of nutrient-poor soils and is commonly found on poorly drained acidic peatlands. It is considered a climax species over most of its range; however, some ecologists question whether black spruce forests truly attain climax because fires usually occur at 50 to 150 year intervals, while "stable" conditions may not be attained for several hundred years. The frequent fire return interval, a natural fire ecology, perpetuates numerous successional communities. Throughout boreal North America, Betula papyrifera (paper birch) and Populus tremuloides (quaking aspen) are successional hardwoods that frequently invade burns in black spruce. Black spruce typically seeds in promptly after fire and with the continued absence of fire eventually dominates the hardwoods.

Black spruce is a pioneer that invades the sphagnum mat in filled-lake bogs, though often preceded slightly by Larix laricina (tamarack). Black spruce frequently out-competes shade-intolerant tamarack in the course of bog succession. However, as the peat soil is gradually elevated by the accumulation of organic matter and the fertility of the site improves, balsam fir and northern white cedar (Thuja occidentalis) eventually replace black spruce and tamarack. On drier sites following fires, black spruce can take over stands of faster growing jack pine (Pinus banksiana) by virtue of its ability to grow in partially shaded conditions which inhibit pine seedlings. But black spruce seedlings are intolerant to the low light and low moisture conditions under mature spruce stands. Balsam fir and northern white cedar, both more understory-tolerant species with deeper taproots, survive and eventually succeed the spruce in the absence of fire.

The spruce budworm, a moth larva, causes defoliation which kills trees if it occurs several years in a row, though black spruce is less susceptible than white spruce or balsam fir. Trees most at risk are those growing along with balsam fir and white spruce.

== Cultivation ==
Numerous cultivars have been selected for use in parks and gardens. The cultivar P. mariana 'Nana' is a dwarf form which has gained the Royal Horticultural Society's Award of Garden Merit. Picea mariana is known to hybridize with Serbian spruce, Picea omorika. The hybrid is Picea machala, and hybrids with Sitka spruce are known as well.

== Uses and symbolism ==
Black spruce is the provincial tree of Newfoundland and Labrador. The timber is of low value due to the small size of the trees, but it is an important source of pulpwood and the primary source of it in Canada. Fast-food chopsticks are often made from black spruce. It is increasingly being used for making cross laminated timber by companies such as Nordic Structures, which allows the high strength due to the tight growth rings to be assembled into larger timbers. Along with red spruce, it has also been used to make spruce gum and spruce beer.

== Gallery ==
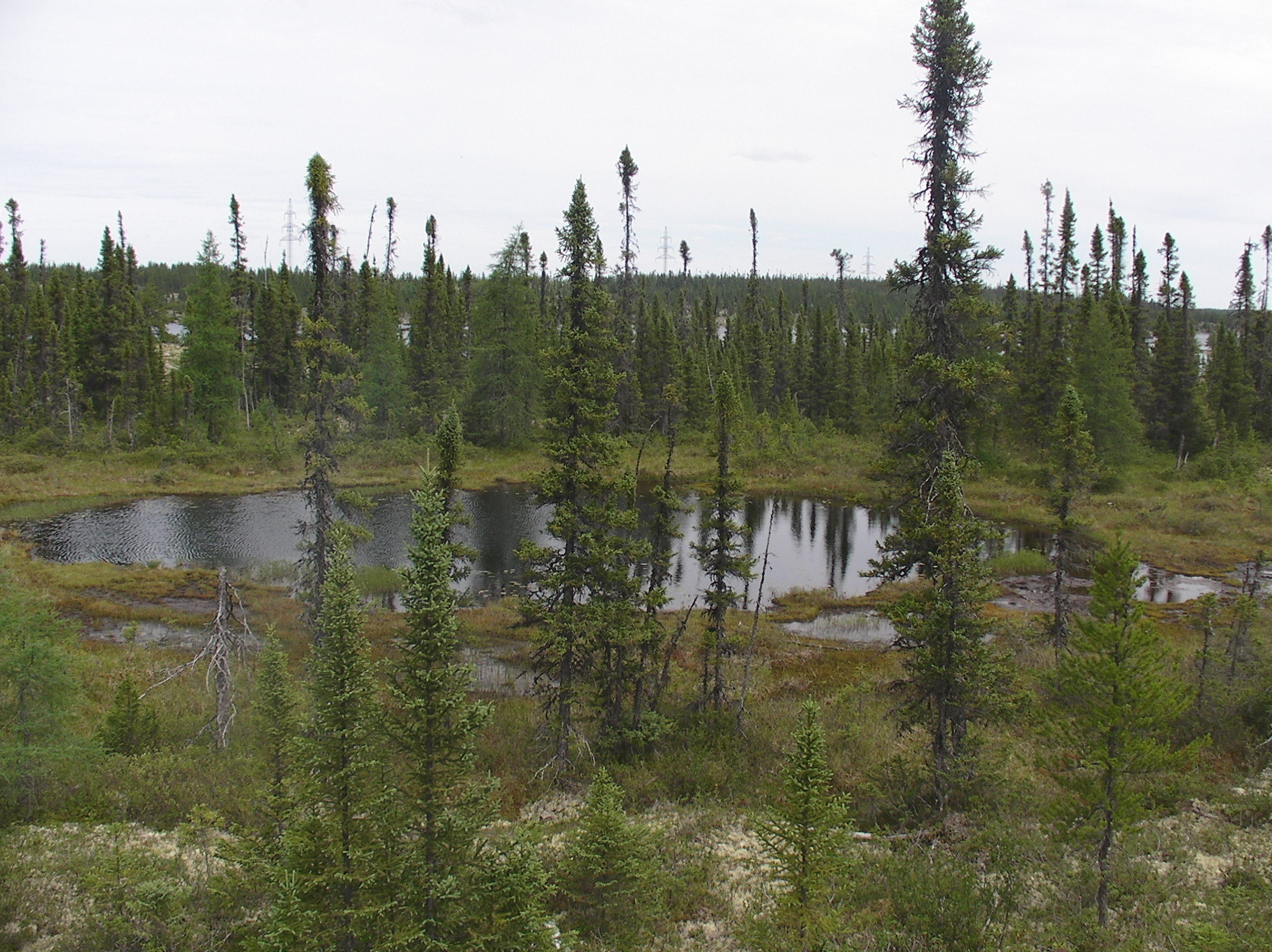
Boggy taiga habitat

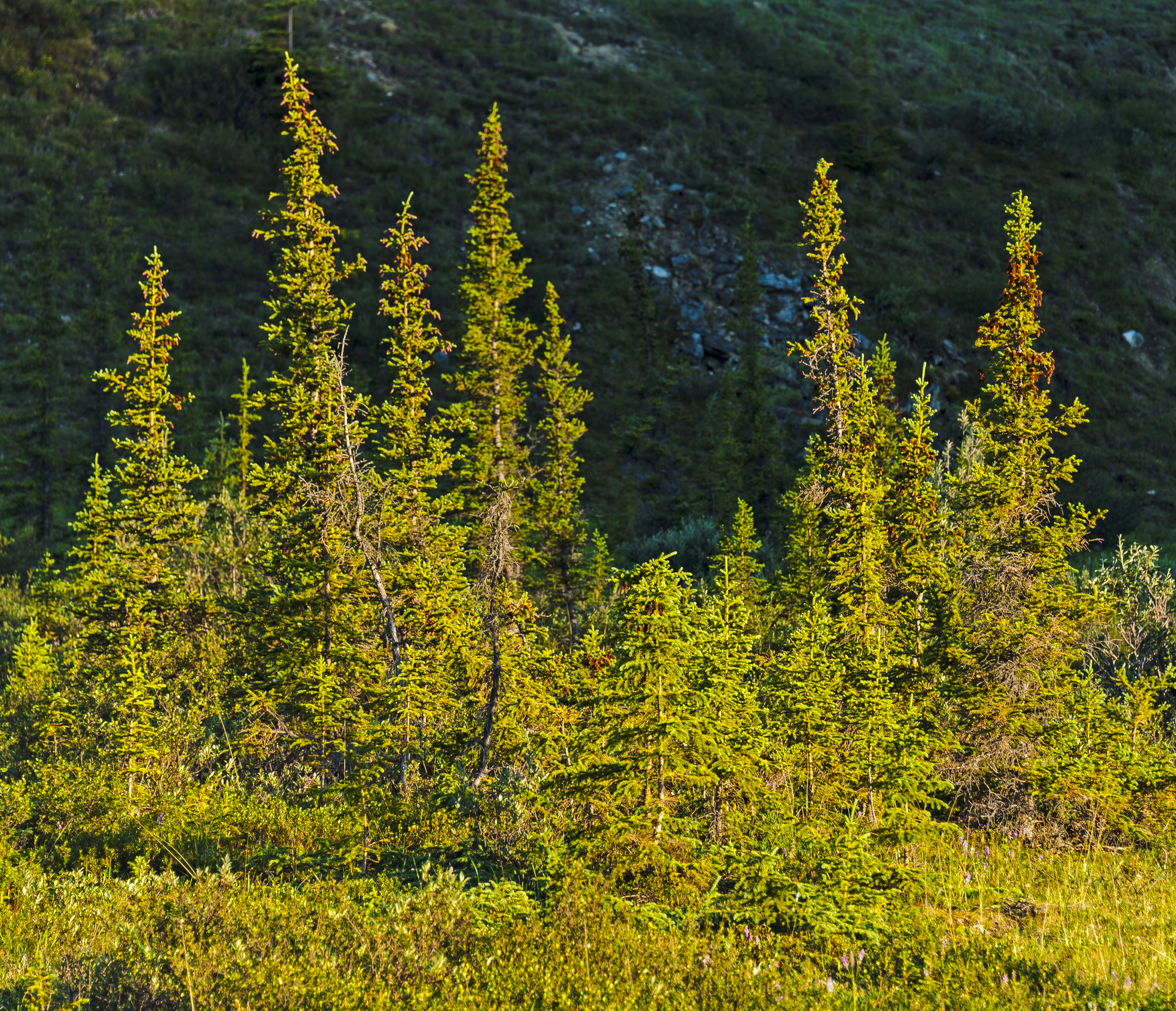
Lit by the midnight sun in Ivvavik National Park

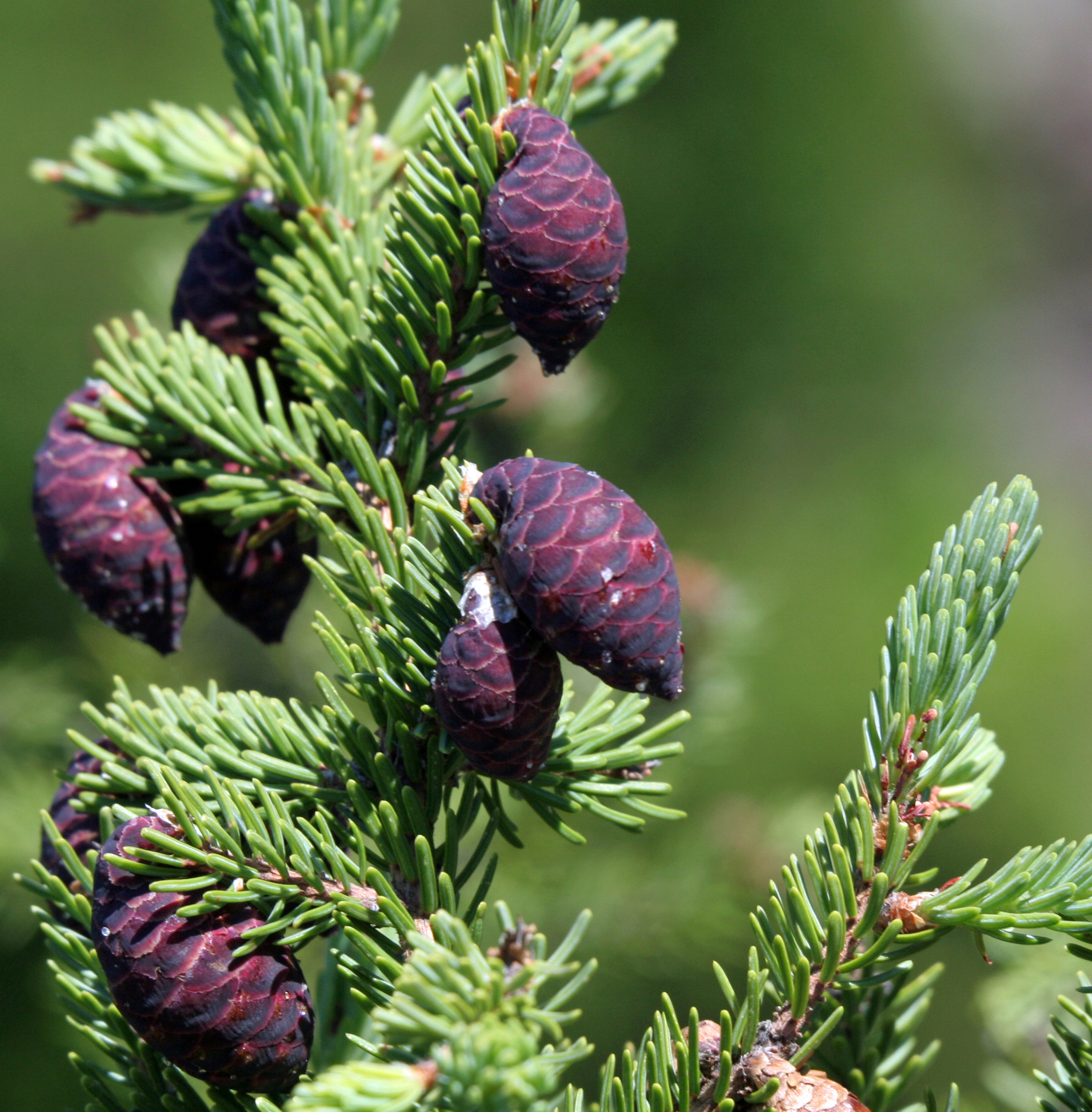
Immature cones

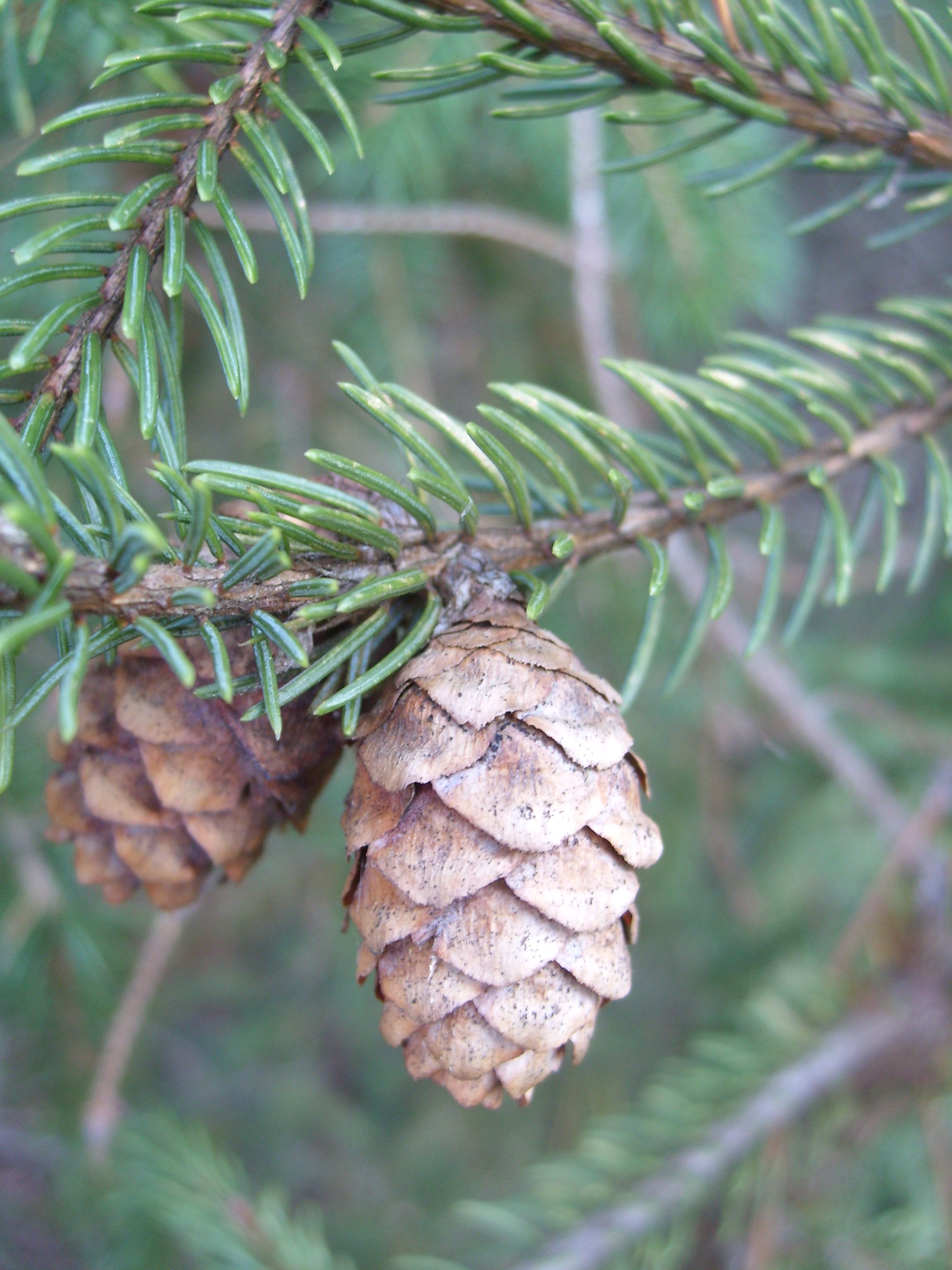
Mature, open cones

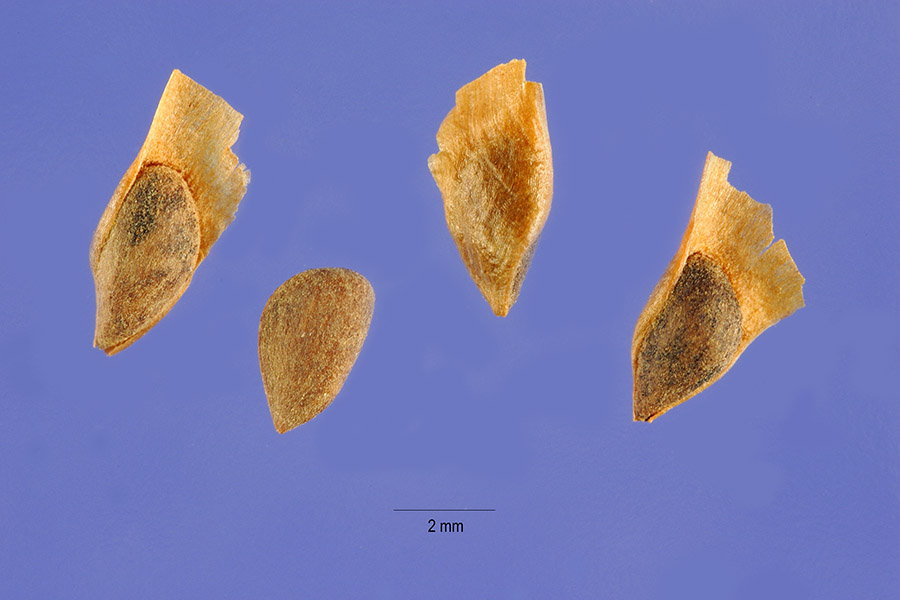
Seeds

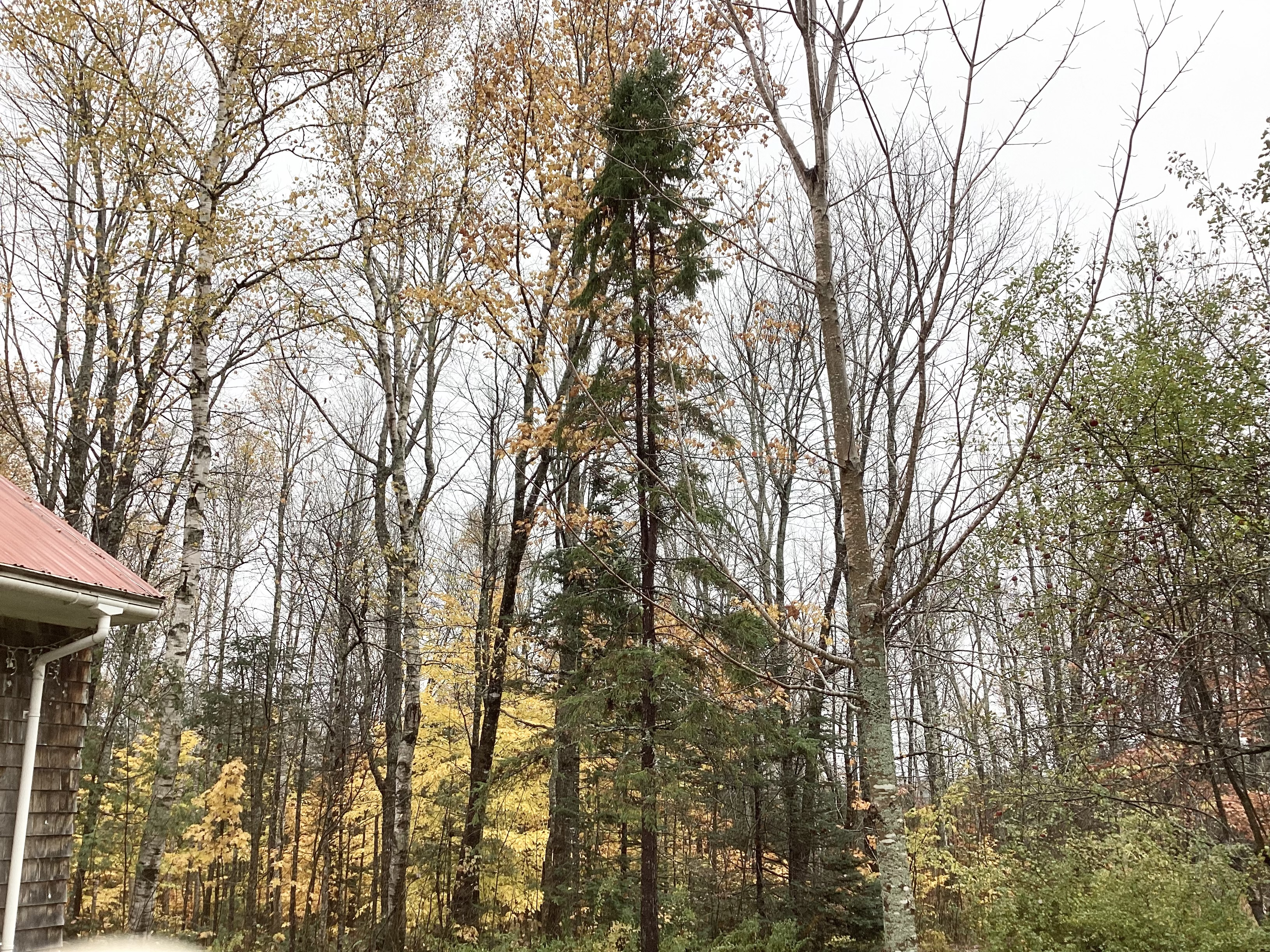
Black spruce in Abbot, Maine
