= Ice pruning =

Natural process of selective vegetative pruning on the windward side of a plant

Ice pruning is the natural process of selective vegetative pruning on the windward side of a plant, executed by the impact of ice and snow particles driven by wind. The process is sometimes termed snow pruning. The time scale required for this phenomenon is typically over several growing seasons. The characteristic asymmetry of an ice-pruned plant is achieved only if the prevailing winds during the snow season have a definite directional bias, as shown on a wind rose.

Ice pruning is seen in high latitudes and altitudes, such as high mountain slopes and locations more than 50 degrees of latitude from the equator. In parts of northern Canada, forests dominated by Black Spruce have been noted for containing individual trees that are distinctively ice-pruned.

== See also ==
- Salt pruning
