= Winter storm =

Weather of freezing precipitation and extreme winds

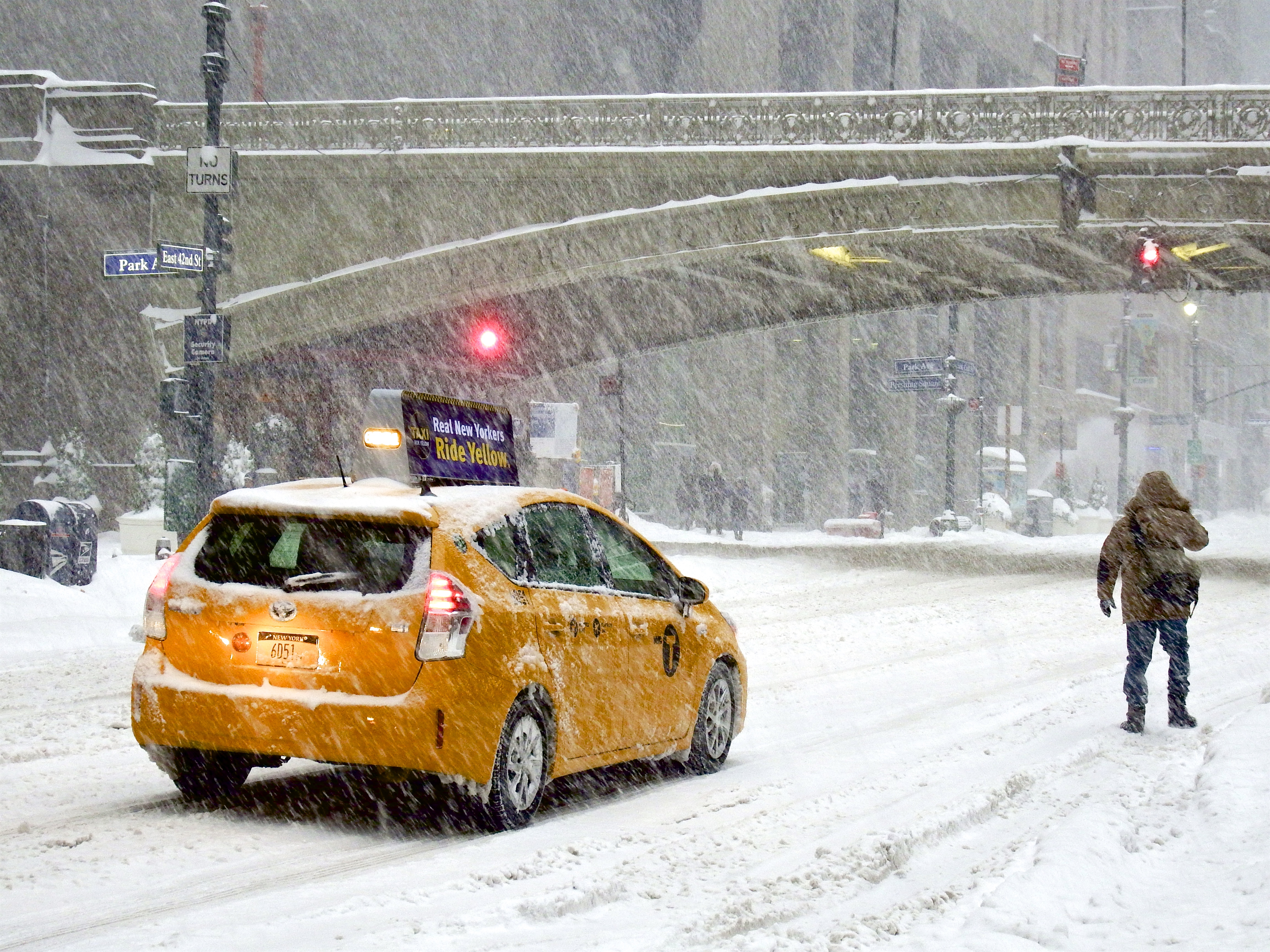
Heavy snowfall and strong winds during a 2016 blizzard in New York City, United States.

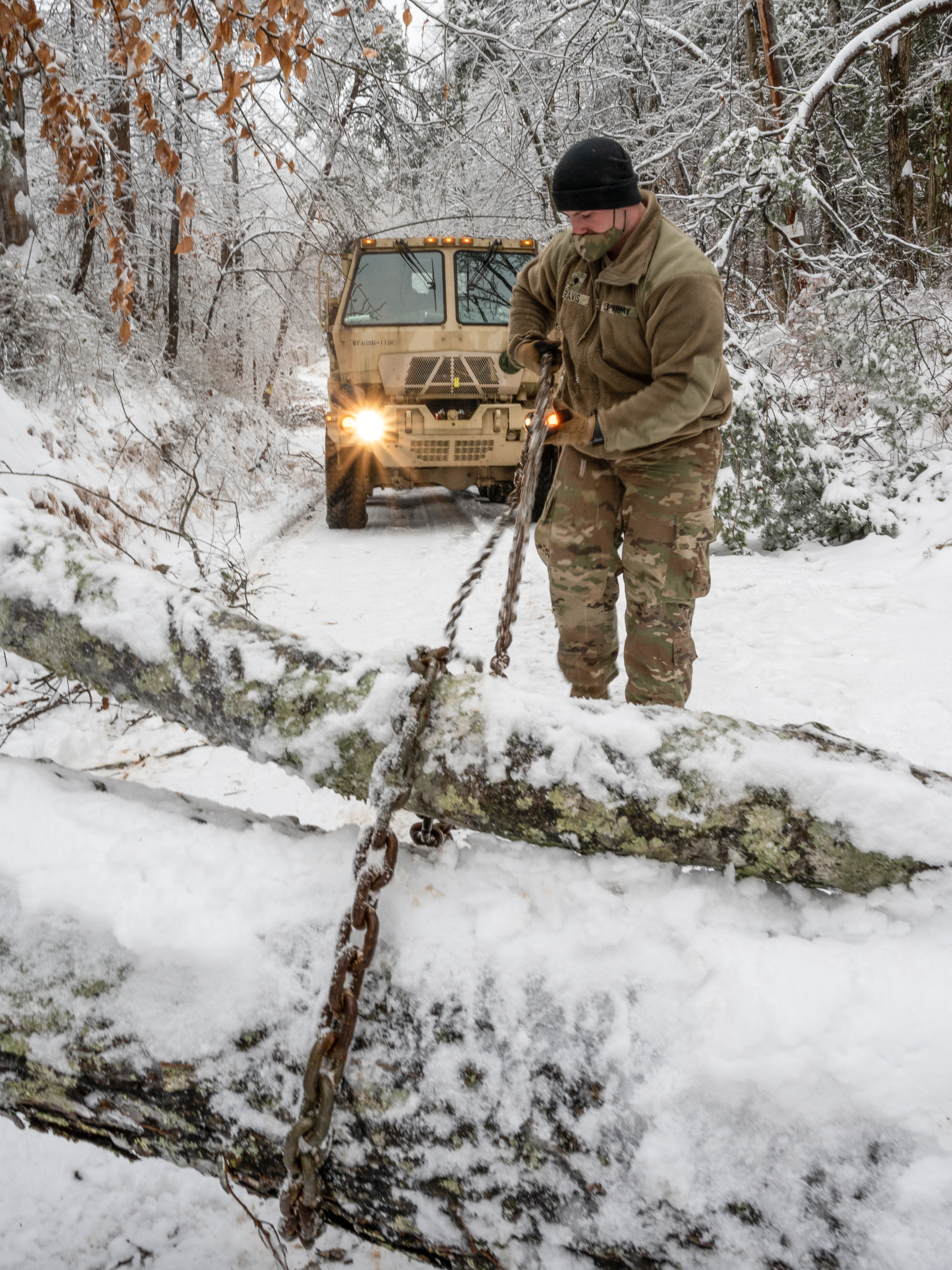
National Guard members clear a road of fallen trees after a February 2021 winter storm in Putnam County, West Virginia, United States.

A winter storm (also known as snow storm) is an event in which wind coincides with varieties of precipitation that only occur at freezing temperatures, such as snow, mixed snow and rain, or freezing rain. In temperate continental and subarctic climates, these storms are not necessarily restricted to the winter season, but may occur in the late autumn and early spring as well. A snowstorm with strong winds and low visibility is called a blizzard.

== Formation ==
Winter storms are formed when moist air rises up into the atmosphere, creating low pressure near the ground and clouds up in the air. The air can also be pushed upwards by hills or large mountains. The upward motion is called lift. The moisture is collected by the wind from large bodies of water, such as a big lake or the ocean. If temperature is below freezing, 0 °C (32 °F), near the ground and up in the clouds, precipitation will fall as snow, ice, rain and snow mixed (sleet), ice pellets or even graupel (soft hail). Since cold air can not hold as much moisture as warm air, the total precipitation will be less than at higher temperature.

In the United States of America, winter storm warnings will be issued if:

- Snow accumulation is 6 in (15 cm) or more in 12 hours, or 8 in (20 cm) or more in 24 hours.
- Blowing snow is reducing visibility in large areas at winds less than 35 mph (16 m/s).
- Ice accumulations on surfaces are 0.25 in (0.64 cm) or more.
- Ice pellets larger than 1 in (2.5 cm) are formed.
- Wind chill index is less than −35 °F (−37 °C) for more than 3 hours and sustained wind speed of at least 10 mph (4.5 m/s).

Snowstorms with wind speed of more than 35 mph (16 m/s) and reduced visibility of less than 0.25 miles (400 m) for 3 hours or longer are called blizzards.

=== Terminology ===
Severe winter weather conditions called "winter storms", can be local weather fulfilling the criteria for 24 hours, or large storm systems covering part of a continent for several days. With large, massive winter storms, weather in any part of the area covered by the extreme weather is usually called "storm"; even if meteorological criteria for winter storms are not met everywhere. An example of this is the February 13–17, 2021 North American winter storm with snowfall and below freezing temperatures as far south as Texas and the Gulf of Mexico.

== Snowstorm ==
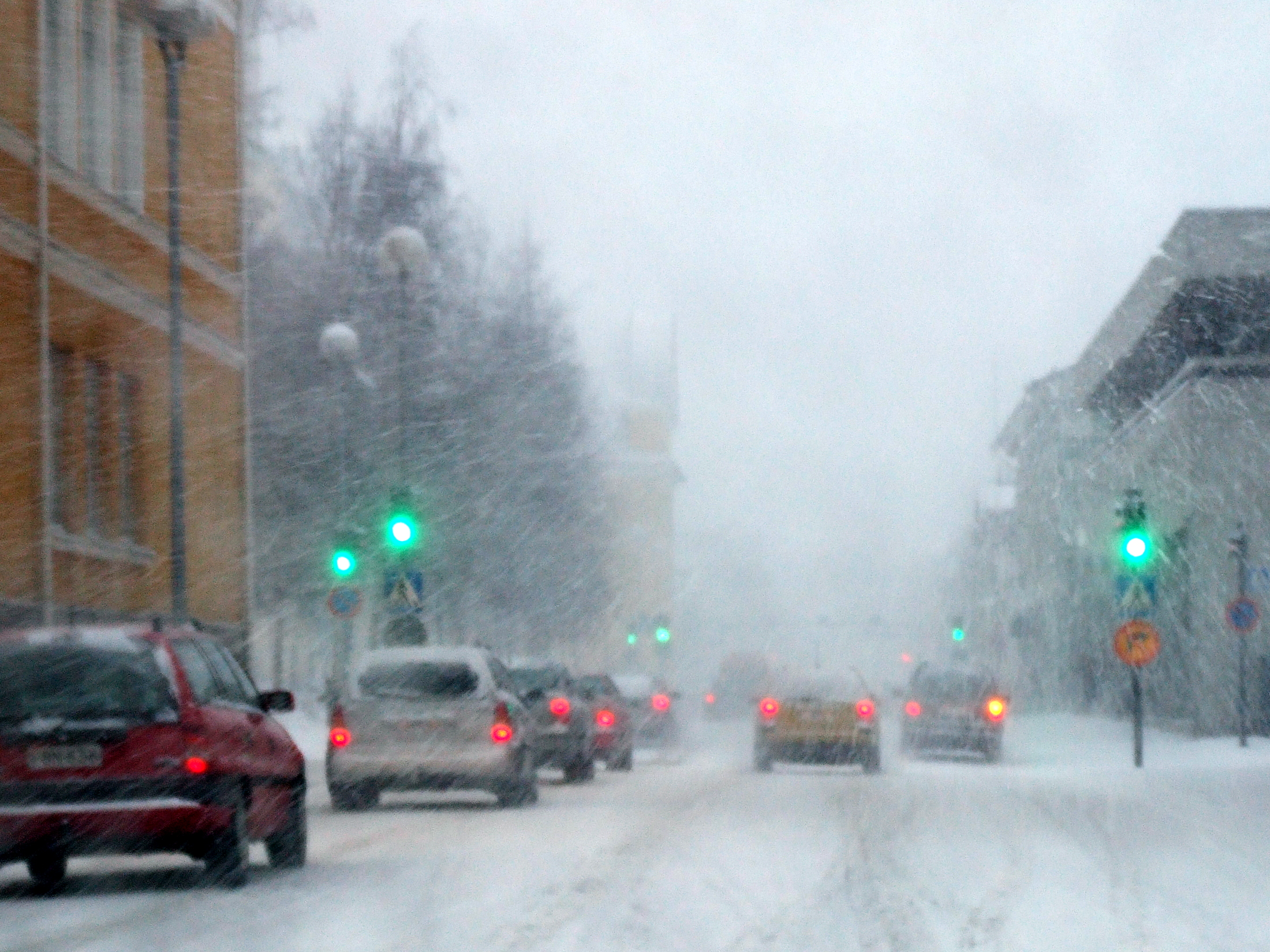
Snowstorm in Oulu, Finland

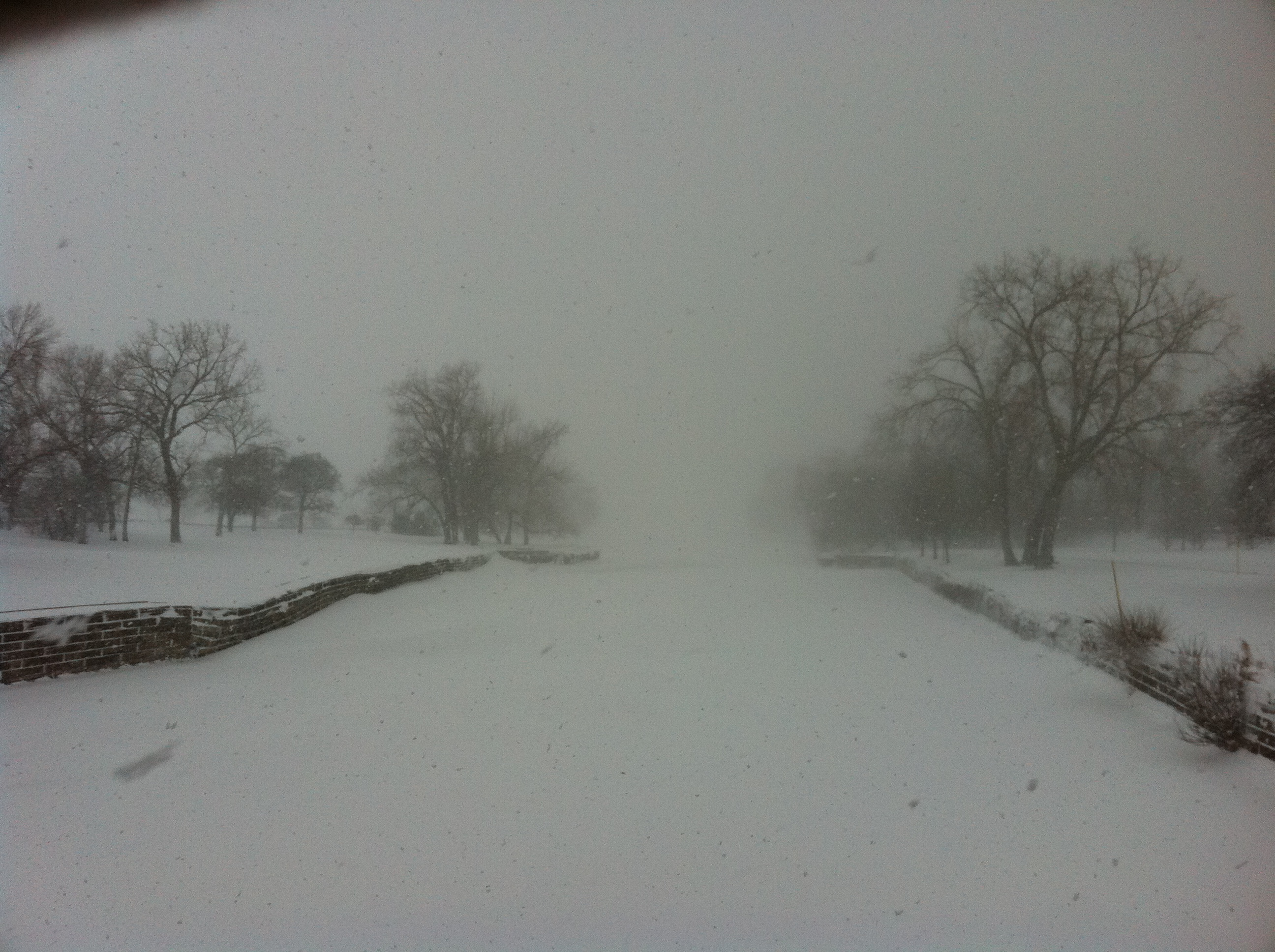
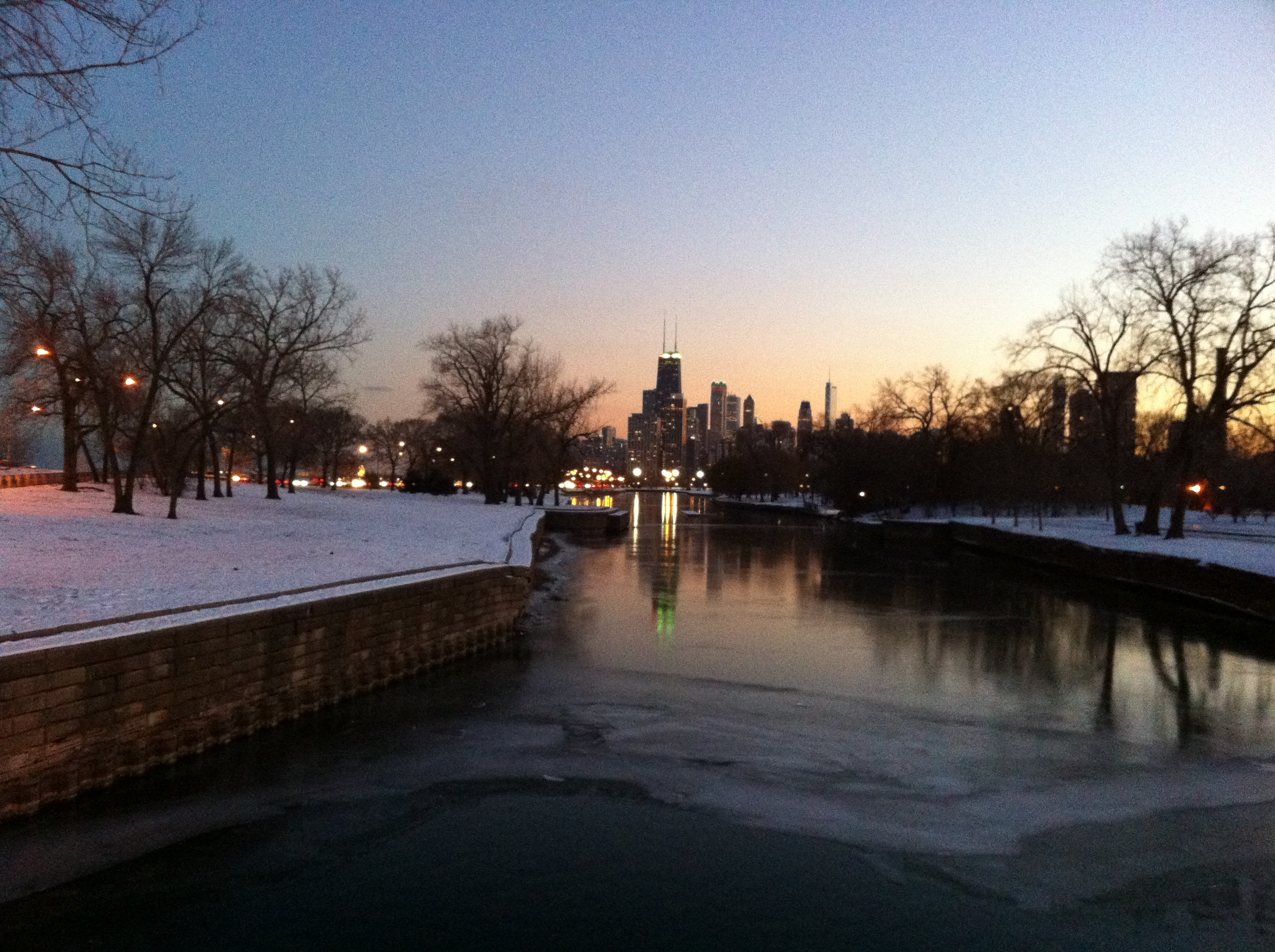
Chicago's Fullerton Harbor looking south during the January 31 – February 2, 2011, North American winter storm (left) and on a clear day for comparison.

Snowstorms are storms where large quantities of snow fall. 2 in (5.1 cm) of snow is enough to create serious disruptions to traffic and school transport (because of the difficulty to drive and manoeuvre the school buses on slick roads). This is particularly true in places where snowfall is not typical but heavy accumulating snowfalls can occur. In places where snowfall is typical, such small snowfalls are rarely disruptive, because of effective snow and ice removal by municipalities, increased use of four-wheel drive and snow tires, and drivers being more used to winter conditions. Snowfalls in excess of 6 in (15 cm) are usually universally disruptive.

A large number of severe snowstorms, some of which were blizzards, occurred in the United States during 1888 and 1947 as well as the early and mid-1990s. The snowfall of 1947 exceeded 2 ft (61 cm) with drifts and snow piles from plowing that reached 12 ft (3.7 m) and for months as temperatures did not rise high enough to melt the snow. The 1993 "Superstorm" manifested as a blizzard in most of the affected areas.

Severe snowstorms could be quite dangerous: a 6 in (15 cm) snow depth will make some unplowed roads impassable, and it is possible for cars to get stuck in the snow. Snow depth exceeding 12 in (30 cm) especially in southern or generally warm climates will cave the roofs of some homes and cause loss of electricity. Standing dead trees can also be brought down by the weight of the snow, especially if it is wet. Even a few inches of dry snow can form drifts many feet high under windy conditions.

=== Hazards from snowfall ===
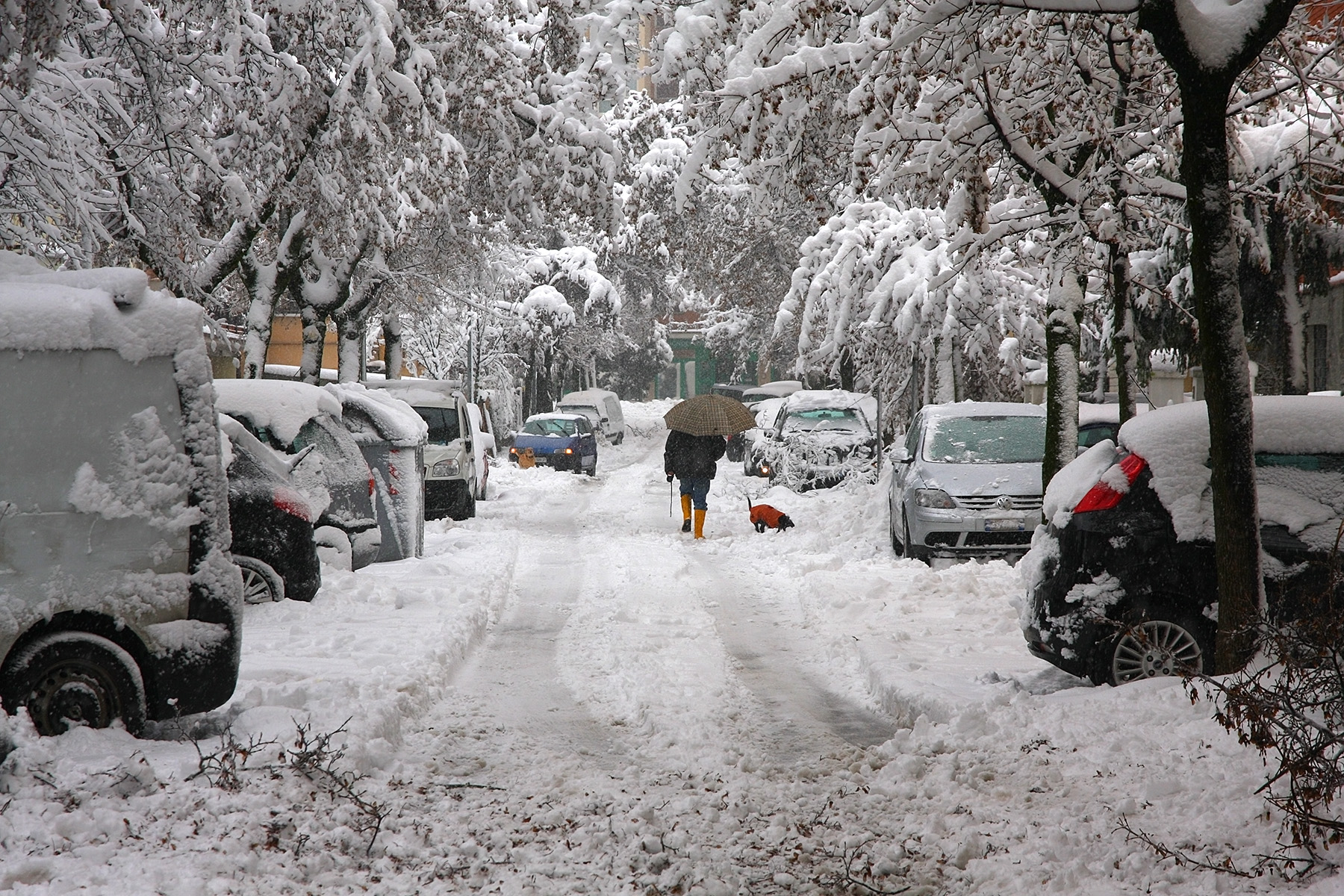
Snow storm in Modena, Italy

Accumulated snow can make driving motor vehicles very hazardous. Snow on roadways reduces friction between tires and the road surface, which in turn lowers the maneuverability of a vehicle considerably. As a result, average driving speeds on public roads and highways are reduced by up to 40% while heavy snow is falling. Visibility is reduced by falling snow, and this is further exacerbated by strong winds which are commonly associated with winter storms producing heavy snowfall. In extreme cases, this may lead to prolonged whiteout conditions in which visibility is reduced to only a few feet due to falling or blowing snow. These hazards can manifest even after snowfall has ended when strong winds are present, as these winds will pick up and transport fallen snow back onto roadways and reduce visibility in the process. This can even result in blizzard conditions if winds are strong enough. Heavy snowfall can immobilize a vehicle entirely, which may be deadly depending on how long it takes rescue crews to arrive. The clogging of a vehicle's tailpipe by snow may lead to carbon monoxide buildup inside the cabin.

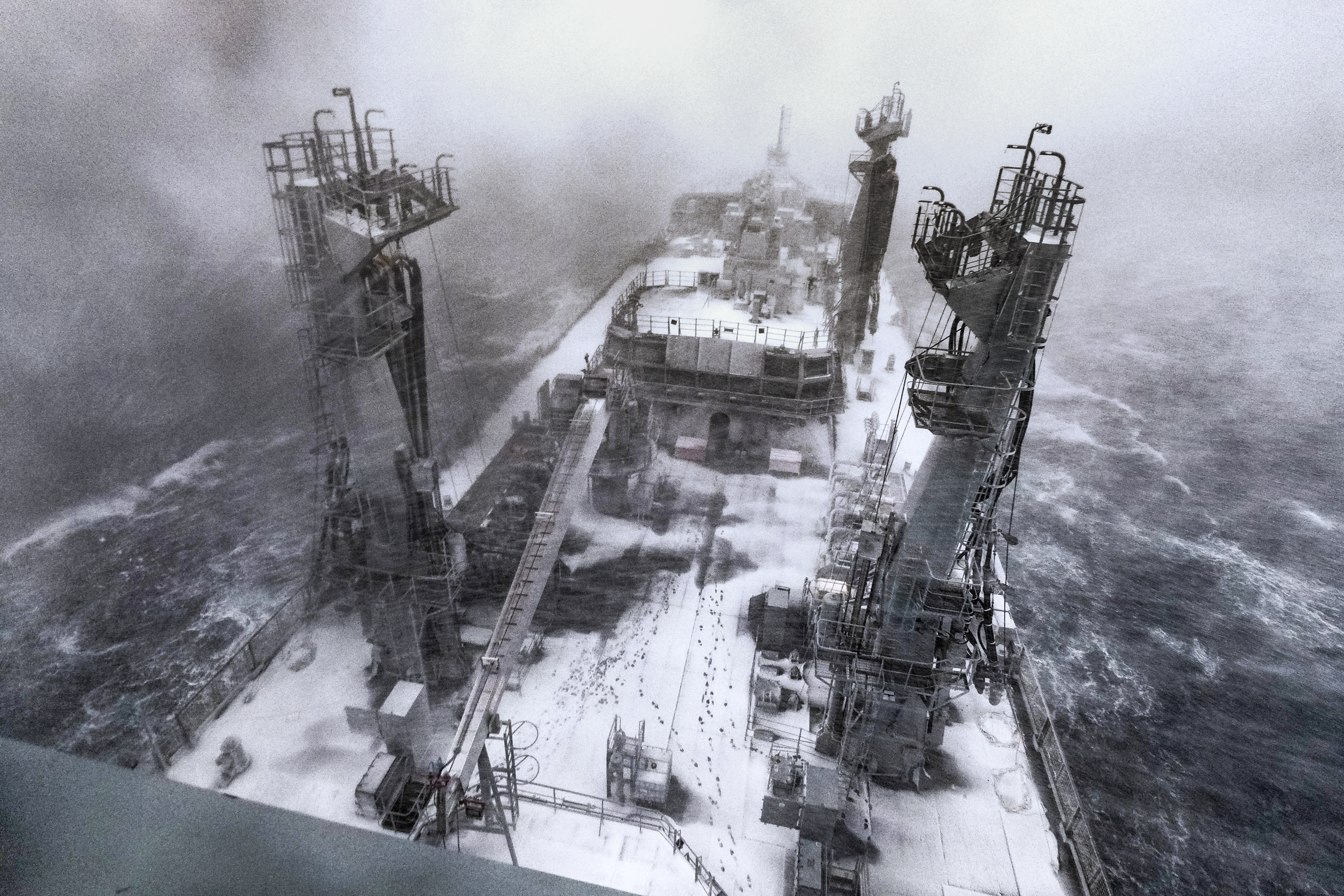
Wet snow and sleet during a winter storm, on the deck of RFA Tidespring south of Plymouth in the English Channel.

Depending on the temperature profile in the atmosphere, snow can be either wet or dry. Dry snow, being lighter, is transported by wind more easily and accumulates more efficiently. Wet snow is heavier due to the increased water content. Significant accumulations of heavy wet snow can cause roof damage. It also requires considerably more energy to move and this can create health problems while shoveling when combined with the harsh weather conditions. Numerous deaths as a result of heart attacks can be attributed to snow removal. Accretion of wet snow to elevated surfaces occurs when snow is "sticky" enough which can cause extensive tree and power line damage in a manner similar to ice accretion during ice storms. Power can be lost for days during a major winter storm, and this usually means the loss of heating inside buildings. Other than the obvious risk of hypothermia due to cold exposure, another deadly element associated with snowstorms is carbon monoxide poisoning which can happen anytime combustion products from generators or heating appliances are not properly vented. Partially or fully melted snow on roadways can refreeze when temperatures fall, creating black ice.

== Freezing rain ==
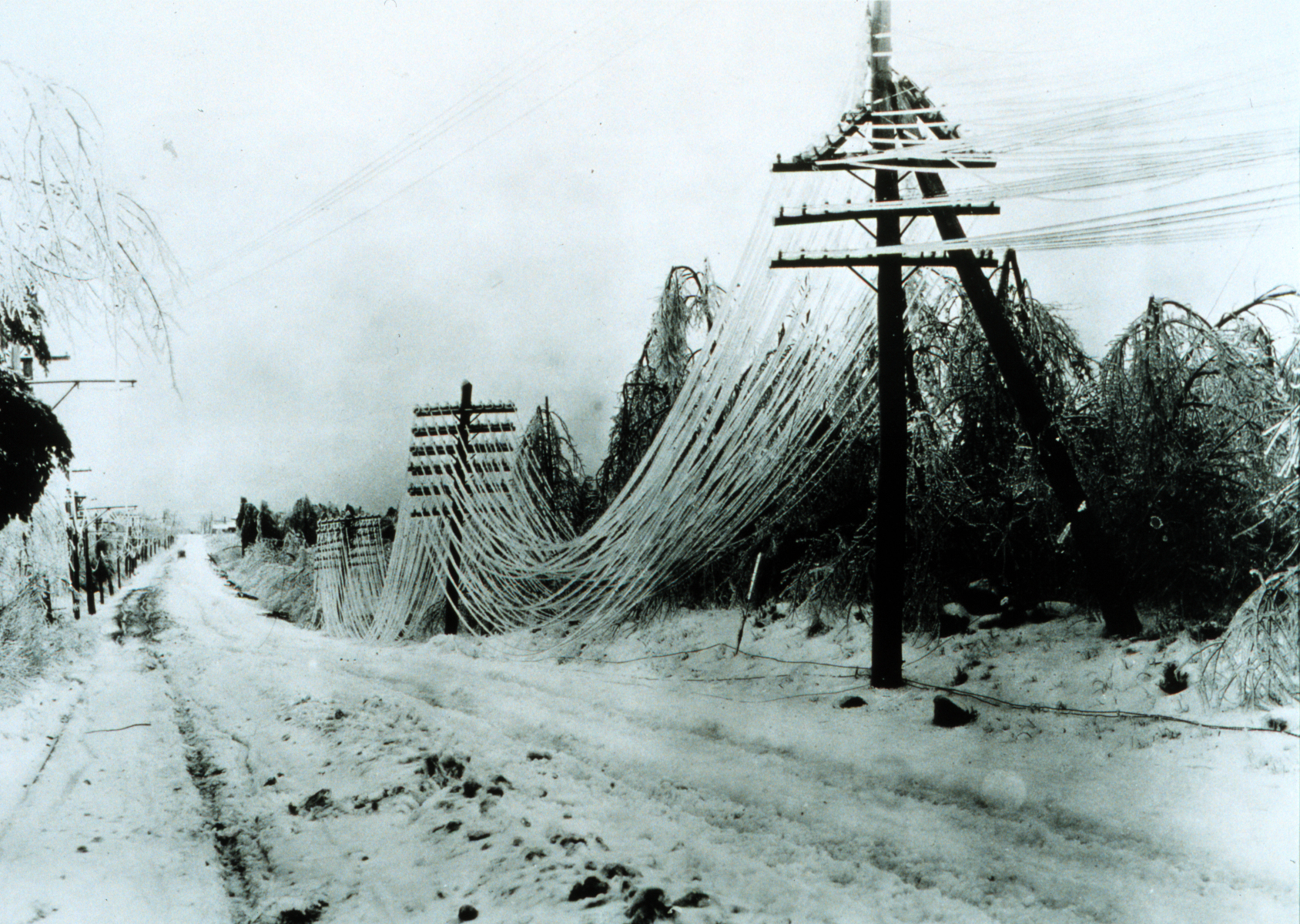
Coated in ice, power and telephone lines sag and often break, resulting in power outages.

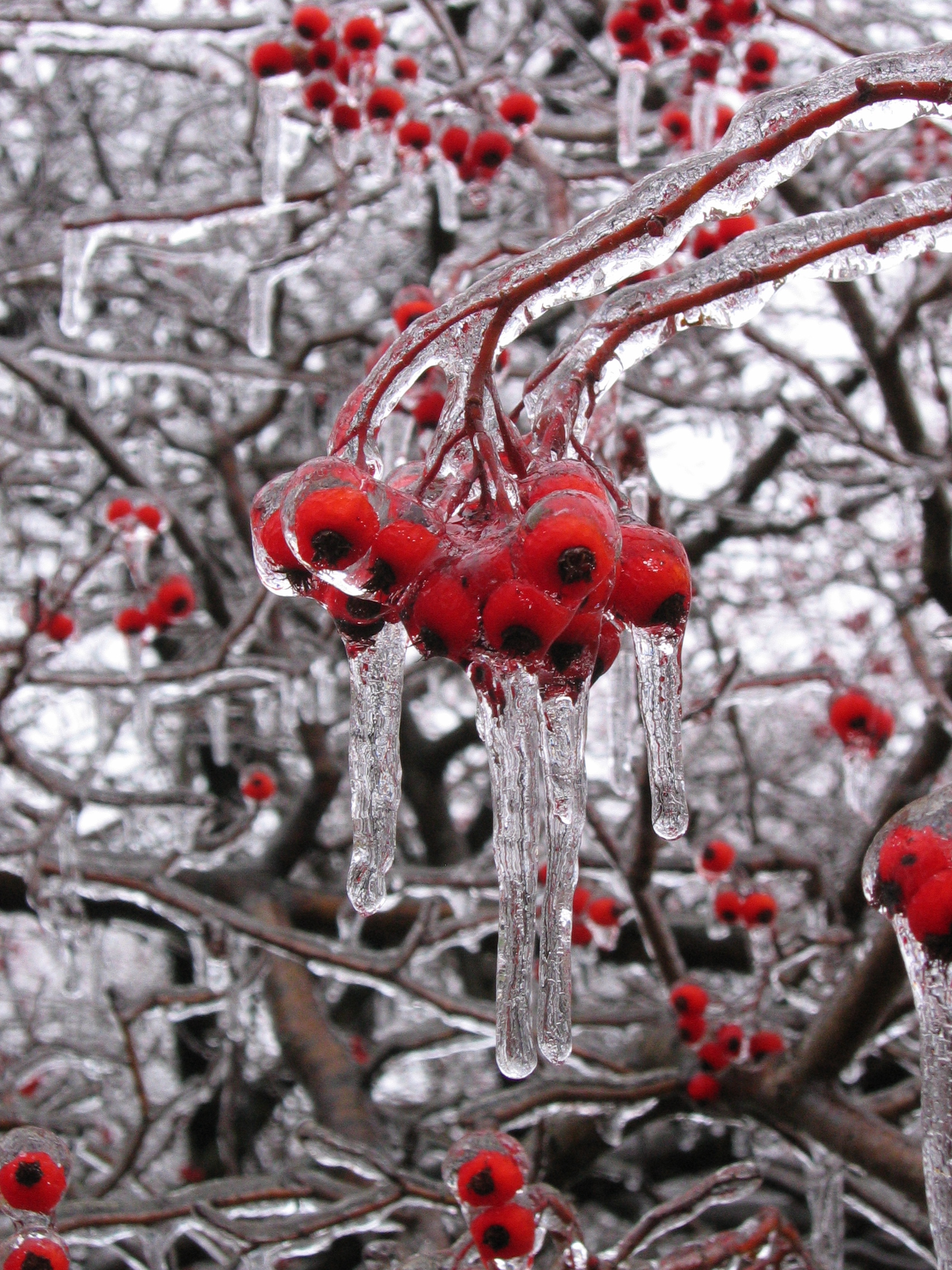
Hawthorn berries covered in icy glaze due to freezing rain. Ice storms often coat many surfaces. Severe ice storms, which may occur in spring, can kill plant life.

Heavy showers of freezing rain are one of the most dangerous types of winter storm. They typically occur when a layer of warm air hovers over a region, but the ambient temperature a few meters above the ground is near or below 0 °C (32 °F), and the ground temperature is sub-freezing.

While a 10 cm (3.9 in) snowfall is somewhat manageable by the standards of the northern United States and Canada, a comparable 10 mm (0.39 in) precipitation of an ice storm can paralyze a region; driving becomes extremely hazardous, telephone and power lines are damaged, and crops may be ruined.

=== Notable ice storms ===
Notable ice storms include an El Niño-related North American ice storm of 1998 that affected much of eastern Canada, including Montreal and Ottawa, as well as upstate New York and parts of upper New England. Three million people lost power, some for as long as six weeks. One-third of the trees in Montreal's Mount Royal park were damaged, as well as a large proportion of the sugar-producing maple trees. The amount of economic damage caused by the storm has been estimated at $3 billion CAD.

- 2000 Christmas Day Ice Storm, caused devastating electrical issues in parts of Arkansas, Oklahoma, and Texas. The city of Texarkana, Arkansas experienced the worst damage, at one point losing the ability to use telephones, electricity and running water. In some areas in Arkansas, Oklahoma, Texas and eventually Louisiana, over 1 in (25 mm) of ice accumulated from the freezing rain.
- 2002 North Carolina ice storm, resulted in massive power loss throughout much of the state, and property damage due to falling trees. Except in the mountainous western part of the state, heavy snow and icy conditions are rare in North Carolina.
- 2005 December Ice Storm, was another severe winter storm producing extensive ice damage across a large portion of the Southern United States on December 14 to 16. It led to power outages and at least 7 deaths.
- 2005 January winter storm in Kansas, had been declared a major disaster zone by President George W. Bush after an ice storm caused nearly $39 million in damages to thirty-two counties. Federal funds were provided to the counties during January 4–6, 2005 to aid the recovery process.
- 2009 January Central Plains and Midwest ice storm, was a crippling and historic ice storm. Most places struck by the storm, saw 2 inches (51 mm) or more of ice accumulation, and a few inches of snow on top of it. This brought down power lines, causing some people to go without electricity for a few days, to a few weeks. In some cases, electricity was out for a month or more. At the height of the storm, more than 2 million people were without electricity.
- 2021 Winter Storm was the deadliest winter storm since the Blizzard of 1996 impacting most of the midwest and southcentral United States. The state of Texas gained notable publicity due to the failure of the state's power grid, causing blackouts and power outages for 7–10 days across the state.

== Preparing for winter storms ==
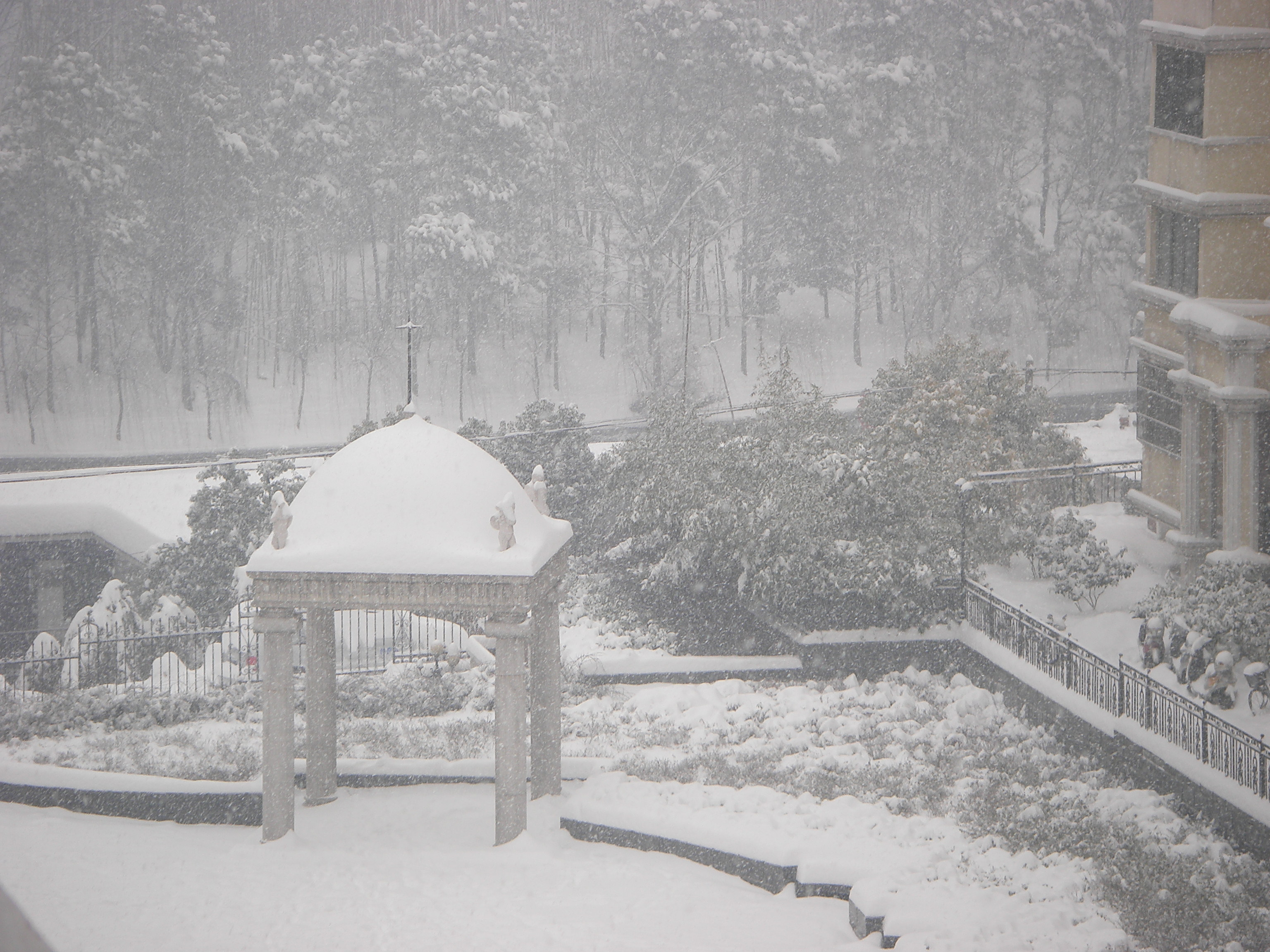
2008 Chinese winter storm in Hefei, Anhui Province, China

In countries where winter storms can occur, governments and health organizations have websites and online services with advice about how to prepare for the consequences of severe weather. Advices vary with housing standards, infrastructure and safety regulations, but some tips are the same, such as: stock up on three days of food, water, medicines and hygiene items, keep warm clothes ready, keep a flashlight and extra batteries, stay informed, help each other, do not travel unless absolutely necessary.

== See also ==
- Alpine storms
- Classifications of snow
- Cold wave
- Heavy snow warning
- Ice storm warning
- List of snowiest places in the United States by state
- Severe weather terminology (United States)
- Severe weather terminology (Canada)
- Siberian Express
- Snow emergency
- Winter weather advisory
- Winter storm warning
- Winter storm watch
- Blizzards and other storms
  - Great Blizzard of 1888
  - North American blizzard of 1947
  - 2011 Groundhog Day blizzard
  - July 2007 Argentine winter storm
  - October 2013 North American storm complex
  - St. Patrick's Day Snowstorm of 1892
  - Winter of 2010–11 in Europe
  - Winter of 2010–11 in Great Britain and Ireland
  - Late December 2022 North American winter storm
