= Weather of 2013 =

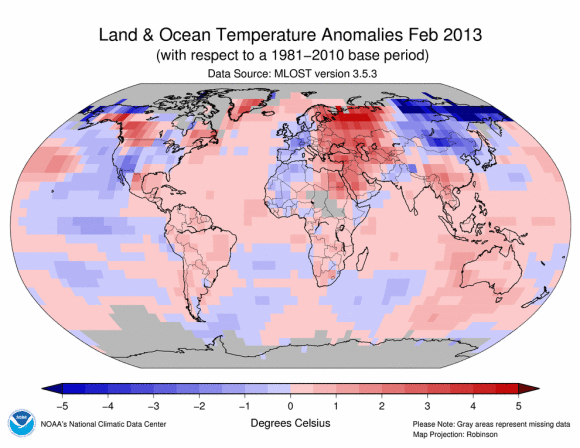
Land and ocean temperature values in February 2013 compared to a 1981–2010 base period.

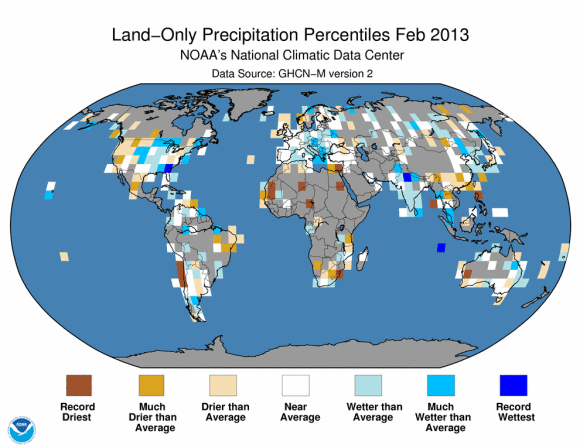
Differences of land precipitation percentiles in February 2013 from average values.

The 2013 extreme weather events included several all-time temperature records in Northern and Southern Hemisphere. The February extent of snow cover in Eurasia and North America was above average, while the extent of Arctic ice in the same month was 4.5% below the 1981–2010 average. The Northern Hemisphere weather extremes have been linked to the melting of Arctic sea ice, which alters atmospheric circulation in a way that leads to more snow and ice.

By January 11, 233 weather-related deaths were reported in India. Elsewhere, particularly in Russia, the Czech Republic and the United Kingdom, low temperatures affected wildlife, delaying bird breeding and disrupting the bird migration. On January 10 Bangladesh faced the lowest temperature since country's independence, at 3.0 °C (37.4 °F) in Saidpur. While Finland and most of Northern European countries got the record high, and even the highest temperatures at Europe during May and June, Western and Middle Europe faced much cooler weather and even their wettest May and June ever. During summer prolonged heat waves in the Northern Hemisphere set new record high temperatures.

On March 24, 2014, the secretary-general of the World Meteorological Organization Michel Jarraud announced that "many of the extreme events of 2013 were consistent with what we would expect as a result of human-induced climate change".

== Cold spring in the Northern Hemisphere ==
In the Northern Hemisphere, the weather pattern repeatedly directed cold Arctic air southward, leaving Greenland and northeastern Canada much warmer than average for March. High pressure situated over Greenland acted as a block, forcing the jet stream into a southerly flow. Observations over Greenland threatened to break the worldwide record for highest barometric pressure of 1083.3 mbar, set on December 31, 1968, in Siberia, the National Centers for Environmental Prediction’s Ocean Prediction Center forecast a high pressure center of at least 1074 mbar over Greenland during March. A Greenland block was also noticed during the cold weather seen in 2010. The Arctic oscillation index changed from positive to negative, weakening the pressure gradient. Throughout March the west Atlantic winds, which normally kept the winters in Europe relatively mild, have been blowing chiefly from the northeast, bringing in cold Arctic air. The westerly Atlantic winds were weakened by small air pressure difference between northern and southern latitudes. In late March, the Arctic oscillation index dropped to −5.6 and much of Northern Hemisphere experienced particularly low temperatures. The low value of the Arctic oscillation was the second lowest March value on record. The British Met Office described the cold temperatures as part of a larger-scale weather pattern in the Northern Hemisphere, associated with the negative phase of the North Atlantic Oscillation.

=== North America ===
==== Canada ====
Due to expected low temperatures overnight on February 16 and 17, an extreme cold weather alert was issued in Toronto. On February 16 Environment Canada also issued a weather statement for York, Durham, Peel and Halton areas, warning of intensifying flurries.

On December 22, a severe ice storm brought snow and freezing rain to Toronto, and much of Eastern Canada. The storm caused widespread power outages and left hundreds of thousands in the dark.

==== United States ====
The cold wave in the United States was influenced by a low-pressure area called a "Clipper" which brought an Arctic cold front that caused rapidly falling temperatures and strong northwest winds with gusts of 35–50 miles per hour (56–80 km/h).

In January 2013, Salt Lake City had an average temperature of 19.4 °F (−7.0 °C), which became the coldest month on record since 1949 and the sixth-coldest January since 1874.

On March 5 a record 6-inch snow depth was noted in Chicago's O'Hare International Airport, exceeding the previous 1999 record for that date by 2.2 inches. On the same day 900 flights were cancelled in O'Hare Airport, while Midway Airport reportedly cancelled 240 flights. U.S. Airways reported 350 flight cancellations for March 6.

In Orlando, Florida, the temperature lowered to 41 °F (5 °C) on March 28, 2 degrees below the record of 1955. The lowest minimum temperature record of 1971 (51 °F (11 °C)) was also broken in West Palm Beach, Florida, where a temperature of 48 °F (9 °C) was recorded on March 28.

On May 1–3, a late snow storm occurred across the central United States from Arkansas to Minnesota. The storm formed from a deep upper level trough which became a cut-off low, the event was named "Achilles" by the Weather Channel. The storm broke records for depth of snow and lateness in the season, and was cited as the worst May snow since 1947.

During mid- to late-May, the tornado outbreaks of May 18–21 and May 26–31 resulted in over 100 tornadoes, including an EF5 tornado in Moore, Oklahoma, and an EF3 tornado in El Reno, Oklahoma. The related storms also resulted in record-breaking rains in North Dakota, New York, and Vermont. The tornado that went through El Reno broke the record for widest tornado ever recorded, at 2.6 miles wide.

The October 2013 North American storm complex was a blizzard and tornado outbreak that affected the Northwest, Rockies, and much of the Midwest.

The incident trapped over 6 dozen people inside of their automobiles and harmed 15 people in suburban Iowa and Nebraska. Rapid City, the second largest city in South Dakota, was engulfed in close to two feet of snow, which exceeds the amount of snow that the city has ever recorded during any whole month of October. Furthermore, on October 4, 2013, the city received over 1.5 feet of snow, which exceeded the previous one day record in October by more than six inches. Over 20 000 people lost electricity in Black Hills, where more than a meter of watered down, dense snow had fallen. The storm system also included thunderstorms that brought iced precipitation, significant rain and over half a dozen tornadoes to Nebraska and Iowa. Over 200 km of Interstate 90 were shut down from South Dakota to Wyoming.

Tens of thousands of cattle were killed in South Dakota with ranchers reporting loss of 20 to 50% of their herds. Thousands of people were without power. Three people died in a motor vehicle accident on U. S. Route 20 in Nebraska.

On December 6, a daily record snowfall of 0.1 inches (2 mm) is set in the Dallas–Fort Worth metroplex, breaking the old record of trace amounts of snow set in 1950.

=== Europe ===
During March a cold easterly flow across northern Europe from Russia brought intense snowfalls across the continent as it met moisture filled air masses from Ukraine to Ireland.

==== Czech Republic ====
Stopped on their annual way to the north by the cold weather, thousands of European golden plovers occupied the fields of central Moravia and southeast Bohemia. The cold weather also delayed the arrival of migratory birds that spend the summer in the Czech Republic. In Příbram the temperature on March 24 broke the 1883 record of −9.4 °C (15.1 °F), being 1.8 degrees lower.

==== Finland ====
In Finland, a cold wave hit on the first days of March 2013. The cold wave had very sunny and dry weather for over a month-long period and brought the lowest temperatures for the 2012–13 winter season. The lowest measured temperature (−38.2 °C) was recorded on March 13 in Taivalkoski. Total rainfall was less than 50% of the average in most parts of Finland. With 2–6 °C colder temperatures from 1981 to 2010 average, March was the coldest winter month in Finland from early 2013 after a mild January and February, and also the coldest March for seven years.

==== France ====
Northern France was hit by heavy snow beginning on March 11, with Météo-France warning of "dangerous weather of an exceptional intensity". French Prime Minister Jean-Marc Ayrault activated a crisis committee to coordinate government efforts to "guarantee security and movement of the country's citizens." Snowfall across Normandy, Brittany and Picardy was up to 40 cm deep and drifting in 100 km/h winds. Eurostar suspended its cross-channel services between Paris and London. The storm also hit the Channel Islands, producing 8-foot high drifts on Guernsey with blizzards described as the worst since 1979 according to the Jersey Met Office.

==== Hungary ====
On March 15 tanks were deployed to reach thousands of motorists trapped in heavy snow. On March 22 the heaviest March snows in at least 400 years in Budapest canceled outdoor activities, related to commemoration of Hungarian Revolution of 1848.

According to OMSZ, the country's meteorological service, this spring was the second wettest since 1901.

==== Germany ====
Mainz experienced a very cold March. The average high of 6.0 °C was 5.4 °C below the 1989–2018 mean (11.4 °C), and the coldest on record since 1917, leading to a very late onset of spring. Cherry plums took until mid-April to flower, while normally they do so in early March. Heavy snow fell on the 12th

==== Italy ====
Lethal cold has been recorded in Pale di San Martino of −49.6 °C (−57.3 °F) on February 10, 2013.

==== Norway ====
The northern Norwegian region of Nordland saw unusually heavy snowfall, with late March seeing falls in excess of 1 metre deep. Many places in the south mountain area like Geilo, Haukeli and Hovden have their coldest average temperature in March on record. Many places had temperatures more than 5 degrees below average.

==== Russia ====
According to the Russian Bird Conservation Union, the cold weather in the European part of Russia stalled the bird migration, except for the rooks. The weather conditions also suspended the bird migration to Russian Far East. On March 3 thousands of snow rollers formed at the frozen surface of Sineglazovo Lake. On March 15 an all-time low temperature was recorded in Novosibirsk, surpassing the city's 1964 record by 0.5 °C. On April 1 the VVC weather station in Moscow recorded the city's highest snow cover since 1895, at 65 cm, which surpassed the previous record by 9 cm.

==== Spain ====
Spain saw unusual late April snow, with weather warnings in 18 provinces. The event was widely attributed to a cut-off low.

==== Ukraine ====
The Kyiv State Administration declared a state of emergency in the city on March 23 "due to the deterioration of weather conditions [heavy snowfall, blizzards, snow-banks]". The government established a weather crisis center under direct supervision of Prime Minister Mykola Azarov. The weather conditions forced the authorities to make Monday, March 25, a day off for all those employed in the government sector in Kyiv and Kyiv Oblast, except medical services and those tackling the aftermath of the snowfall. March 23 brought heavy snow to Ukraine with the normal monthly amount of snow falling in just 24 hours. With the state of emergency declared the military used armoured personnel carriers to drag buses out of snow drifts.

==== United Kingdom ====
The United Kingdom experienced a very severe cold spell in March–April 2013. March was the coldest in the Central England region since 1883. The mean temperature across the country was just 2.2 °C (36.0 °F), with March 1962 only being colder at 1.9 °C (35.4 °F). Also in March, the country reported less sunlight, with 82.9 hours, which is 81% of the average. Among the countries in the United Kingdom, the average temperatures were 2.6 °C (36.7 °F) in England, 1.3 °C (34.3 °F) in Scotland, 2.4 °C (36.3 °F) in Wales, and 2.8 °C (37.0 °F) in Northern Ireland.

=== Africa ===
==== Egypt ====
On December 13, a cold snap led to snow in such cities as Cairo, Alexandria and Madinaty for the first time in 112 years.

=== Asia ===
==== China ====
In China the average January temperature became the coldest in 28 years. In northeast China the average temperature in January 2013 decreased to −15.3 °C (4.5 °F), the coldest in 43 years, while in northern China it dropped to a 42-year low of −7.4 °C (18.7 °F). About a thousand ships were stuck in ice in Laizhou Bay, while 10,500 square miles of ice reportedly covered the surface of the Bohai Sea. About 180,000 cattle deaths were reported in northern China by January 10. On May 2, 2013, a minimum temperature of 16.6 °C was recorded at the Hong Kong Observatory, making it the coldest May temperature since 1917. It was also the third-coldest minimum temperature in May since recorded.

==== India ====
In January Delhi experienced night temperatures below 3 °C (37 °F), which was 4 to 5 degrees lower than the normal seasonal average. In the first week of January 2013, Delhi had a temperature of 1.9 °C (35.4 °F), the lowest in 44 years. The IFRC's Disaster Relief Emergency Fund donated 57,100 Swiss francs to support the Indian Red Cross Society in delivering immediate assistance to about 10,000 people. In Uttar Pradesh and Bihar the cold wave dropped the mercury to as low as −1 °C (30 °F) which forced closure of all schools up to grade 12 until January 12.

==== The Levant ====
On January 10, Lebanese cities and especially Beirut were flooded and snow reached the sea and the coast. Israel saw its heaviest snowfall since 1992 in Jerusalem, which accumulated 10 to 15 cm (4 to 6 in) of snow in the city centre and more than that in outlying areas. The snowfall stalled the public transport and blocked a highway linking Jerusalem to Tel Aviv. A foot of snow (30 cm) fell at Safed in northern Israel. Lake Kinneret was refilling after years of drought. Much snow fell across Syria; −6 °C (21 °F) was reported in the east suburbs of Damascus and forced camping people made homeless by the Syrian civil war to desperate measures to find shelter, and caused 17 or more deaths in the Middle East.

== Perturbed European late spring and early summer ==
After a cold March and early April in Finland and Scandinavia, a late, but very strong and widespread spring caused fast snow melting and flooding around Finland. Floods occurred mainly in the Province of Northern Ostrobothnia, where floods hit hardest in Pyhäjoki. In May the weather became exceptionally warm. Thermal summer began about a half-month earlier than usual throughout the country, and after mid-May Finland recorded nine heat-days (maximum temperature over 25 °C) for May 2013; whereas typically there are three heat-days in May. The heat of May 2013 also broke records around Finland's Lapland, which got the warmest temperatures of month. The highest temperature, 30.5 °C, was recorded on May 31, 2013, in Utsjoki. It was the first time the temperature rose over 30 °C in May since 1995, when in Lapinjärvi's Ingermaninkylä was recorded Finland's highest all-time temperature of May, 31 °C. June also had exceptionally warm weather, with seventeen heat-days for the month, where eight heat-days is the norm. The highest temperature, 32.4 °C, was recorded on June 26, 2013, in Liperi. The hot weather brought unusual numbers of thunderstorms and lightning strikes. For June, 78,000 lightning strikes were recorded; the most recorded since June 1995. The single-day record, 28,500 lightning strikes, was recorded on June 27, the highest daily count for the 2000s and 2010s. May and June 2013 were both among the warmest five Mays and Junes in Finland's history.

Germany and areas of Central Europe had their wettest ever May, followed by the severe flooding during the 2013 European floods.

== Blizzards, cold waves, and winter storms ==
In Nordic countries, Cyclone Hilde caused destruction from November 15 to 18, 2013. In Norway the winds blew as strong as 49 metres per second (180 km/h; 110 mph) and the strongest average was 39 metres per second (140 km/h; 87 mph). In Sweden the strongest windspeed was 47 metres per second (170 km/h; 110 mph) speed, which surpassed the former record of 44 metres per second (160 km/h; 98 mph) recorded in association with Cyclone Gudrun in 2005. Cyclone Hilde left about 230,000 households without electricity.

== Heatwaves ==
=== Southwest United States heatwave ===
In late June 2013, an intense heat wave struck Southwestern United States. Various places in Southern California reached up to 122 °F (50 °C). On June 30, Death Valley, California, hit 129.2 °F (54.0 °C) which is the hottest temperature ever recorded on Earth during the month of June. It was five degrees shy of the highest temperature recorded in Death Valley, which was 134.6 °F (57.0 °C), recorded in July 1913.

=== European heatwave ===
After six days in early July with temperatures over 40 °C (104 °F), Portugal officially entered a heat wave. Temperatures reached as high as 45 °C in some places in Alentejo and Ribatejo. Rising temperatures led to heat health warnings being issued for Southern England and the Midlands in the UK's first prolonged heatwave since 2006 on July 17. The UK recorded its hottest day since July 2006, with 33.5 °C (92.3 °F) recorded at Heathrow and Northolt in west London on July 22. This was later beaten again on August 1, when 34.1 °C was recorded at Heathrow Airport. Epidemiological statisticians at the London School of Hygiene & Tropical Medicine using models developed in 2011 estimated the heatwave in England and Wales would have led to the premature deaths of 650 people. London Fire Brigade reported that it had attended on average 29 grass fires a day between July 1–21, seven times the number of call outs for grass fires than the same period in 2012. In Hungary the July heatwave set new daily records for the 27th, 28th and 29th being the hottest day of the year with 40 °C only 2 degrees from the absolute record. A day earlier the 2013 Hungarian Grand Prix was the 2nd hottest in recent Grand Prix history just behind the 2005 Bahrain Grand Prix. Track temperature reached 56 °C and air temperature was 38 °C. Poland had heat waves in mid-June, late July and early August. Kraków broke its record high on August 8, 2013, when it reached 37.2 °C (99.0 °F), the 7th day in a row above 30 °C. Austria saw some of its hottest summers at a record temperature of 40.5 °C (104.9 °F) in Bad Deutsch Altenburg on Aug 8 too.

=== Chinese heatwave ===
In July a heat wave struck China with alerts covering nine provinces, including Anhui, Jiangsu, Hunan, Hubei, Shanghai and Chongqing. Shanghai saw 24 days with temperatures at or above 35 °C in July. Temperatures in Shanghai reached 40.6 degrees Celsius, the highest ever temperature recorded in 140 years of weather recording in the city.

=== Australian heatwave ===
The summer of 2012–2013 in Australia resulted in many heat records being broken over a 90-day period.

== Tornadoes ==
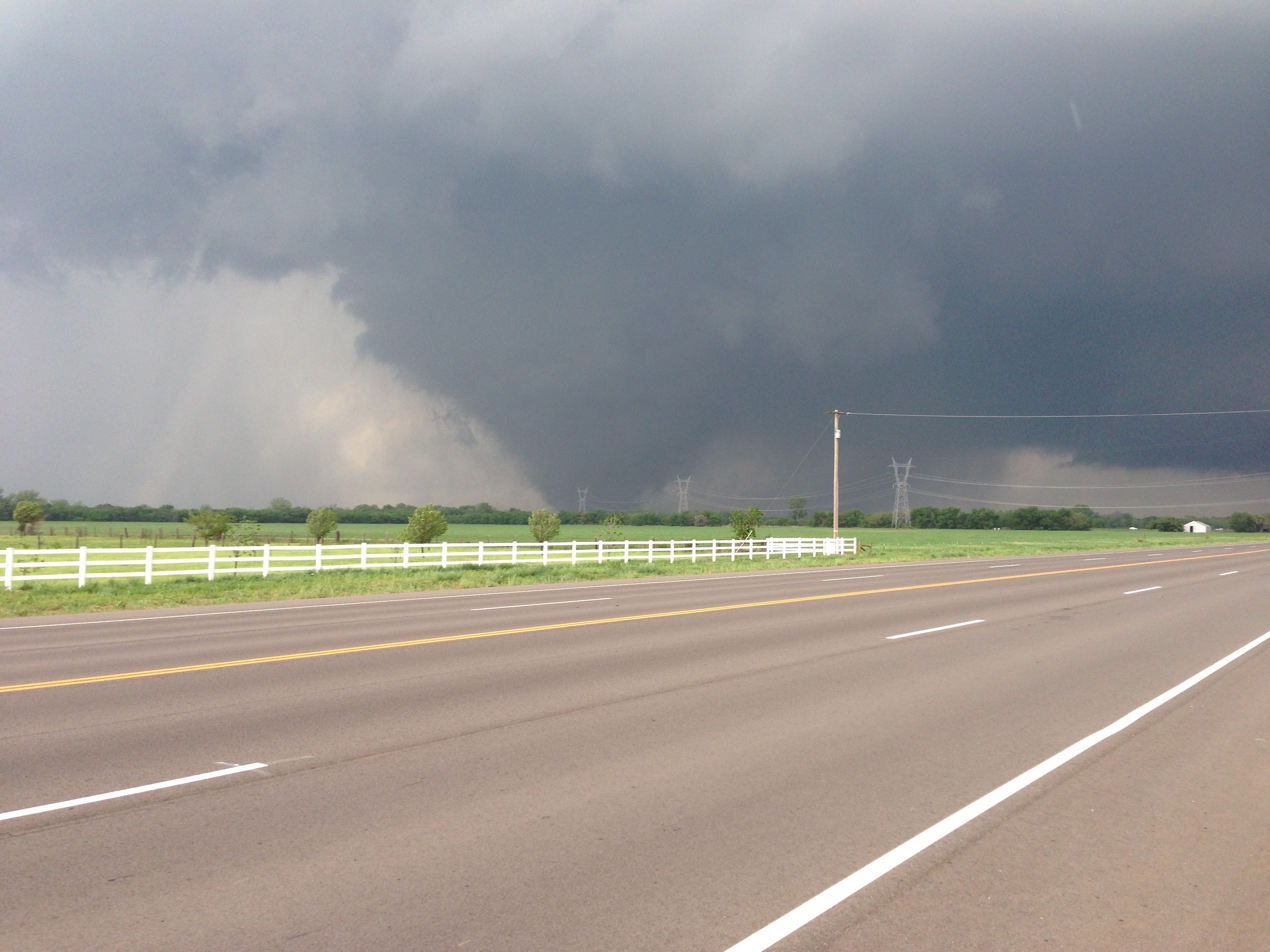
An EF5 tornado in Moore, Oklahoma on May 20.

In 2013, there were 916 confirmed tornadoes in the United States, including 8 EF4 (examples: 2013 Hattiesburg tornado, 2013 Granbury tornado and 2013 Wayne tornado) rated tornadoes and 1 EF5 rated tornado, the Moore, Oklahoma EF5, which claimed 24 fatalities and injuring 212 more. It was the last EF5 rated tornado until 2025. On May 31, the largest tornado on record, an EF3 rated tornado, formed near the town of El Reno, Oklahoma, claiming 8 people (including 4 storm chasers) and injuring 151 others. The El Reno tornado had recorded winds of 313 mph (504 km/h), making it the second highest recorded windspeeds on record in a tornado.

On November 17, a deadly and powerful EF4 tornado struck the city of Washington, Illinois, killing 3 people and injuring 125 others, with recorded winds of 190 mph (310 km/h). On January 23, 2025, an article was published amidst the then-ongoing EF5 drought arguing that the EF5 starting wind speed should be 190 mph (310 km/h), instead of 201 mph (323 km/h), thus classifying this tornado as an "EF5 candidate".

== Tropical cyclones ==
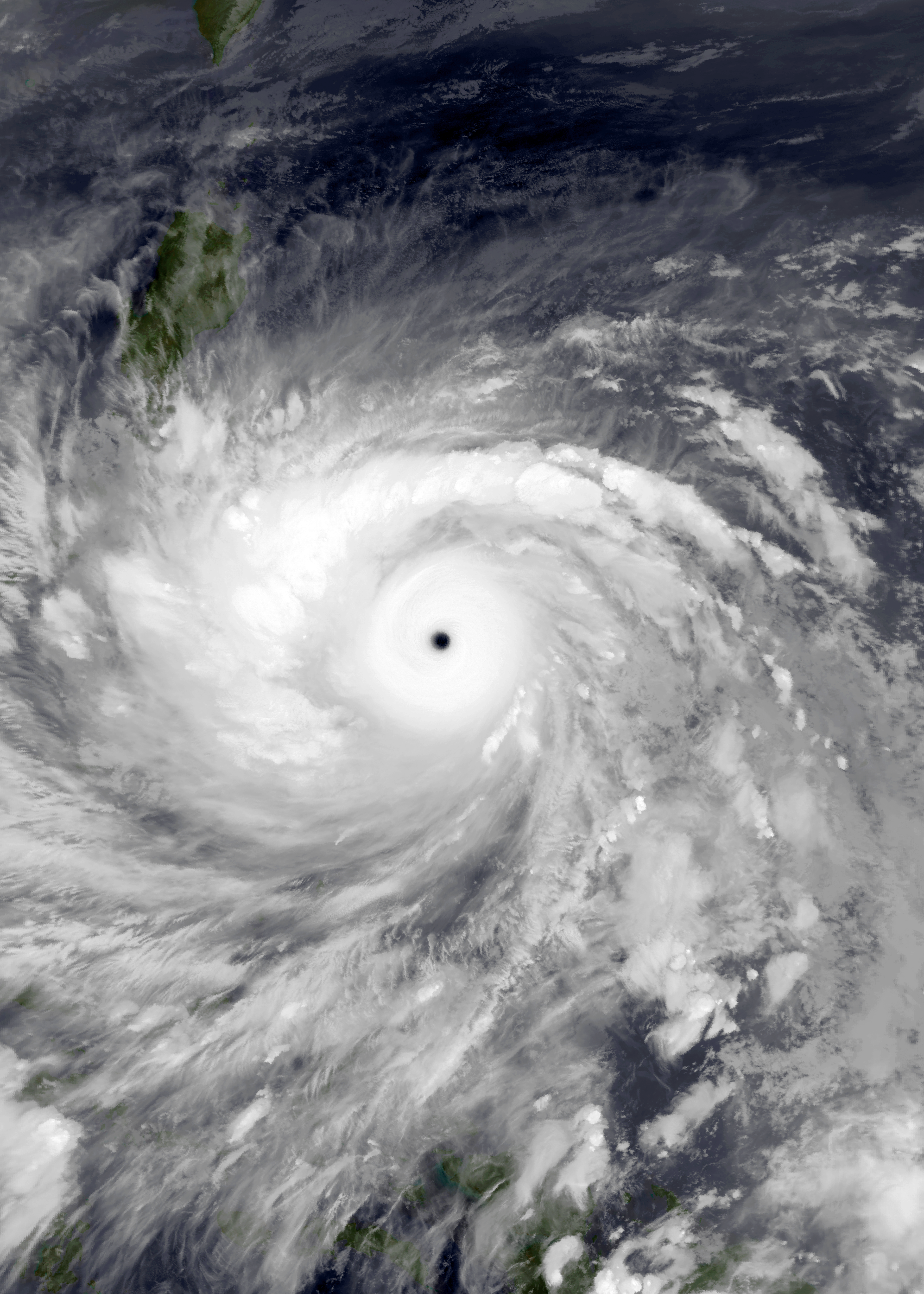
Satellite image of Typhoon Haiyan near peak intensity while approaching the eastern Philippines on November 7

As the year began, Cyclone Freda was moving toward New Caledonia in the South Pacific Ocean, Cyclone Mitchell was dissipating west of Australia, and Cyclone Dumile was northeast of Madagascar.

The strongest and deadliest tropical cyclone of the year was Typhoon Haiyan, which attained a minimum barometric pressure of 895 hPa (26.43 inHg), along with sustained 10 minute winds of 230 km/h (145 mph). It weakened slightly before moving across the central Philippines, causing at least 6,300 deaths in the country.

The costliest tropical cyclone of the year was Hurricane Manuel, which was responsible for at least $4.2 billion worth of damages in Mexico.

== See also ==
- 2013 Southeast Asian haze
- 2013 Middle East cold snap
- 2013 heatwave in Ireland and the United Kingdom

Global weather by year
Preceded by 2012	Weather of 2013	Succeeded by 2014
