= North American blizzard of 1947 =

Weather event in the United States

Great Blizzard of 1947
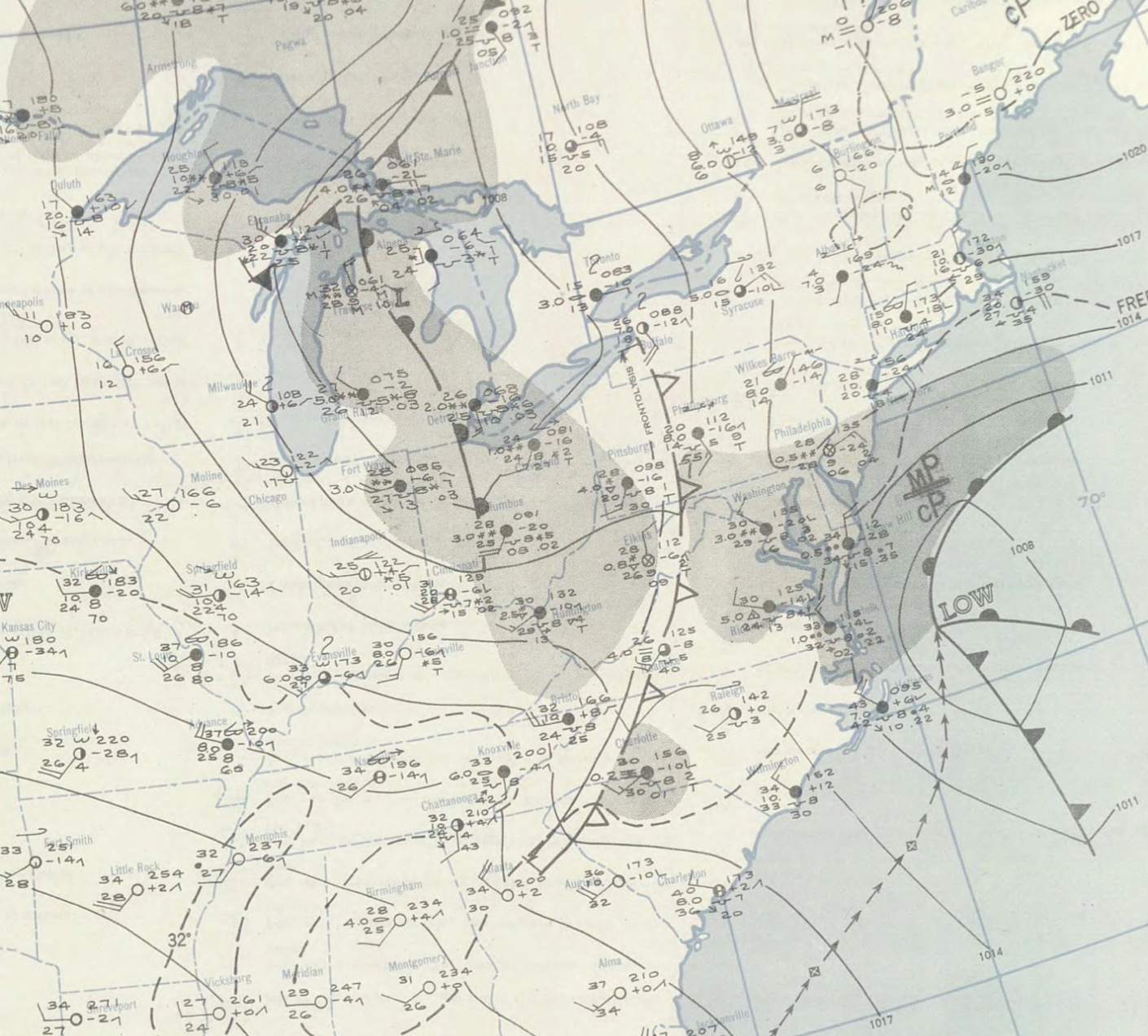
- Surface weather analysis of the storm on December 26

Meteorological history
- Formed: December 25, 1947
- Dissipated: December 26, 1947

Category 3 "Major" blizzard
- Regional snowfall index: 8.11 (NOAA)
- Maximum snowfall or ice accretion: 26.4 inches (67 cm) - recorded at Central Park in Manhattan

Overall effects
- Fatalities: 77
- Areas affected: Mid-Atlantic coastal states

The North American blizzard of 1947 (also known as the Great Blizzard of 1947) was a record-breaking snowfall that began without prediction on the evening of Christmas and brought the northeastern United States to a standstill. The snowstorm was described as the worst blizzard in the region after that of 1888. The storm was not accompanied by high winds, but the snow fell silently and steadily. By the time it stopped on December 26, accumulation had reached 26.4 inches (67.1 cm) in Central Park in Manhattan. Similar or greater accumulations were noted in all of metropolitan New York and New Jersey, as well as in upstate New York, Connecticut, and most of the mid-Atlantic region.

Meteorological records indicate that warm moisture arising from the Gulf Stream fed the storm's energy when it encountered the cold air of the storm and greatly increased the precipitation. Automobiles and buses were stranded in the streets, subway service was halted, and parked vehicles initially buried by the snowfall were blocked further by packed mounds created by snow plows when they were able to begin operation, some not accessible so long as the mounds persisted. Once trains resumed operations, they ran twelve hours late.

Seventy-seven deaths are attributed to the blizzard. Interference with delivery of coal, the typical fuel for furnaces of the day, created emergencies in which facilities and homes with heating through underground gas-distribution systems or having a good supply of wood for their fireplaces became havens until supplies could be provided. Schools were closed. Typical items delivered regularly to homes during that period, such as milk, were subject to delays and sometimes deliveries were not possible due to roadways waiting plowing.

== Effects ==
Drifts exceeded ten feet and finding places to place snow from plowing became problematic, creating snow piles that exceeded twelve feet. In Manhattan, some of the snow was dumped into sewers, where it melted in the warm waste water flowing to the rivers. When possible the snow was dumped directly into the Hudson River and the East River.

New Jersey, Connecticut, and upstate New York were affected heavily as well, but suburban areas did not have such nearby alternatives for disposal of the snow as a city built on islands and most resorted to stacking the snow into piles rivaling the highest drifts. In Connecticut, the Stamford Historical Society site has a photograph of the 1947 snowfall at the end of its discussion of the blizzard of 1888 for comparison. In the book entitled, Disaster!, by Ben Kartman and Leonard Brown, the introduction to an article by Stephen Turkel describes the 1947 storm and its disastrous effects in detail. They noted that the effect of this storm rivaled the tales boasters related about the blizzard of 1888 and in the article, many statistics regarding the 1947 snowfall are given of a type that exceed those recorded in 1888. In February 2022, the storm was recognized as the most snow New Jersey ever received in a 24 hour period, with this storm dropping up to 29.7 in (75 cm) in that timeframe.

The storm progressed westward toward the Great Plains, but with less moisture from the Gulf Stream feeding it along its path, the volume of snow lessened as the distance from warm seawater increased.

Low temperatures that winter led to the snowfall remaining on the ground until March of the next year.

== Lack of forecast ==
The storm advanced over land from the Atlantic Ocean in a westerly direction. That is the opposite of dominant weather patterns for the northeastern United States. Generally, weather patterns there flow from west to east, following the prevailing winds. With no weather stations offshore to note the dynamics responsible for the development of the unusual storm, it arrived without prediction.
