= October 2013 North American storm complex =

Blizzard and tornado outbreak

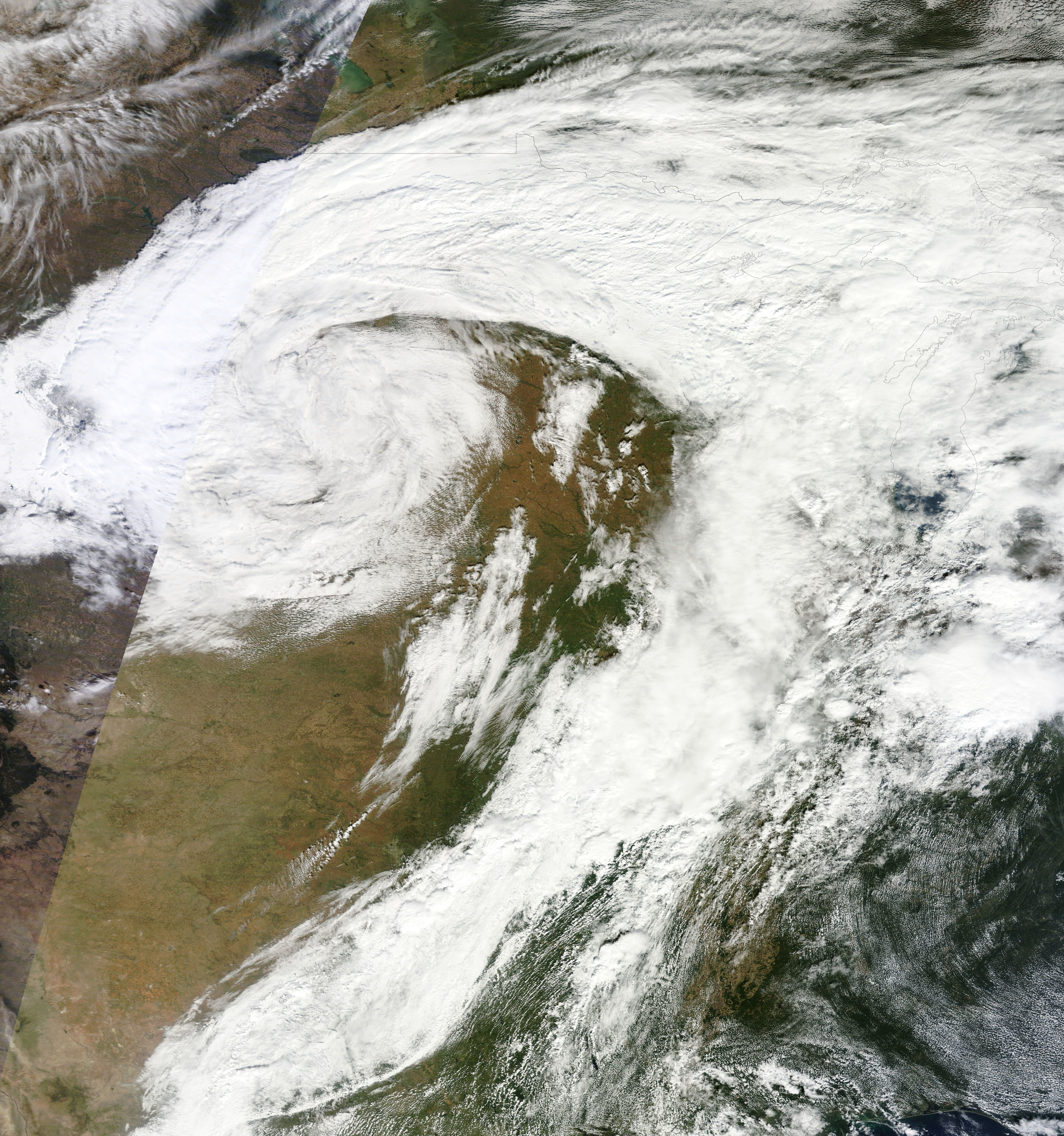
- The storm complex on October 5

Meteorological history
- Formed: October 4, 2013
- Dissipated: October 8, 2013

Category 3 "Major" winter storm
- Regional snowfall index: 9.78 (NOAA)
- Highest gusts: 71 mph (114 km/h)
- Lowest pressure: 1000 mbar (hPa); 29.53 inHg
- Max. snowfall: 58 inches (1.5 m) Lead, South Dakota

Tornado outbreak
- Tornadoes: 22
- Max. rating: EF4 tornado
- Duration: 3 days, 16 hours, 10 minutes

Overall effects
- Fatalities: 3
- Damage: $100 million (2013 USD)
- Areas affected: Intermountain West, Midwestern and Northeastern United States, Atlantic Canada
- Part of the 2013–14 North American winter and tornado outbreaks of 2013

The October 2013 North American storm complex was a massive blizzard and tornado outbreak that affected the Northwest, Rockies, and much of the Midwest in early-October 2013. A total of 22 tornadoes were confirmed as the system moved eastward across the eastern half of the United States, including two that were rated EF4. The storm was unofficially named Winter Storm Atlas by The Weather Channel.

Post-Tropical Cyclone Karen later struck some of the same areas affected by this storm along the Atlantic coastline.

== Meteorological history ==
Map plotting the storm's track and intensity, according to the Saffir–Simpson scale Map key Saffir–Simpson scale Tropical depression (≤38 mph, ≤62 km/h) Tropical storm (39–73 mph, 63–118 km/h) Category 1 (74–95 mph, 119–153 km/h) Category 2 (96–110 mph, 154–177 km/h) Category 3 (111–129 mph, 178–208 km/h) Category 4 (130–156 mph, 209–251 km/h) Category 5 (≥157 mph, ≥252 km/h) Unknown Storm type Tropical cyclone Subtropical cyclone Extratropical cyclone, remnant low, tropical disturbance, or monsoon depression

On October 3, 2013, the National Weather Service issued a blizzard warning for Rapid City and the Black Hills in advance of the storm urging people to delay or cancel travel plans.

Heavy snowfall trapped over six dozen people inside of their automobiles and tornadoes injured 17 people in Iowa and Nebraska. Rapid City, the second largest city in South Dakota, was engulfed in close to two feet of snow, which exceeds the amount of snow that the city has ever recorded during any whole month of October. Furthermore, on October 4, 2013, the city received over 19 inches (48 cm) of snow, which exceeded the previous one day record in October by more than 6 inches (15 cm). Over 20,000 people lost electricity in Black Hills, where more than a meter of watered down, dense snow had fallen. The storm system also included thunderstorms that brought iced precipitation, significant rain and over half a dozen tornadoes to Nebraska and Iowa. Two of these tornadoes were violent enough to be rated EF4 on the Enhanced Fujita scale. Over 200 miles (320 km) of Interstate 90 was shut down from South Dakota to Wyoming.

The storm affected about 5,000 ranches in western South Dakota producing snow totals as high as 5 feet (1.5 m) and 70 mph (110 km/h) winds that scattered herds for miles and resulted in the deaths of many cattle due to exhaustion and hypothermia. In a storm South Dakotans called the Cattleman's Blizzard, at least 14,000 cattle, 1300 sheep, 300 horses, and 40 bison were killed with South Dakota ranchers reporting losses of 20 to 50 percent of their herds. Thousands of people were without power. Three people died in a motor vehicle accident on US 20.

The storm coincided with the United States federal government shutdown of 2013, which limited timely federal response to the disaster.

== Confirmed tornadoes ==
Confirmed tornadoes by Enhanced Fujita rating
EFU	EF0	EF1	EF2	EF3	EF4	EF5	Total
0	10	6	3	1	2	0	22

=== October 3 event ===
List of confirmed tornadoes – Thursday, October 3, 2013 (Note: All dates are based on the local time zone where the tornado touched down; however, all times are in Coordinated Universal Time for consistency.)
EF#	Location	County / Parish	State	Start Coord.	Time (UTC)	Path length	Max width	Summary
EF2	SW of Hickman to N of Palmyra	Lancaster, Otoe	NE	40.6827°N 96.4637°W	0308 – 0339	16.5 mi (26.6 km)	300 yd (270 m)	Two homes lost large portions of their roofs, and others sustained lesser damage. Trees were downed, and three storage buildings were destroyed. Outbuildings were destroyed and vehicles were moved as well.
EF0	SE of Elmwood	Cass	NE	40.7834°N 96.2938°W	0355 – 0409	4.46 mi (7.18 km)	100 yd (91 m)	Tornado touched down south-southwest of Elmwood and moved mostly over open country before lifting east of town. A few trees were downed.

=== October 4 event ===
List of confirmed tornadoes – Friday, October 4, 2013
EF#	Location	County / Parish	State	Start Coord.	Time (UTC)	Path length	Max width	Summary
EF0	E of Madison	Stanton	NE	41.8682°N 97.3351°W	2132 – 2142	4.71 mi (7.58 km)	100 yd (91 m)	No damage was reported with this tornado as it moved through rural areas southwest of Stanton.
EF2	E of Royal	Antelope	NE	42.246°N 98.092°W	2148 – 2201	6.64 mi (10.69 km)	264 yd (241 m)	A strong tornado touched down south-southeast of Royal and ended just to the east-northeast of town. Several farmsteads were damaged (with outbuildings being the primary structures impacted) and numerous trees and power lines were downed.
EF4	SW of Wayne to NNW of Wakefield	Wayne, Dixon	NE	42.128°N 97.077°W	2212 – 2253	18.94 mi (30.48 km)	2,394 yd (2,189 m)	See article on this tornado – Fifteen people were injured; caused $50.5 million in damage. This became the first F4/EF4 tornado in October in the US since the Windsor Locks, Connecticut tornado of 1979, and the first tornado in Nebraska in October since 2001.
EF3	SSE of Creighton to N of Bazile Mills	Antelope, Knox	NE	42.4339°N 97.8817°W	2220 – 2236	6.43 mi (10.35 km)	590 yd (540 m)	This intense tornado touched down just inside Antelope County (to the south-southeast of Creighton) before moving north and into Knox County, where it dissipated 4 miles (6.4 km) north of Creighton. It was initially weak with damage confined to irrigation systems, siding, and shingles. The tornado then strengthened and completely destroyed a building that housed antique Trackers (scattering rubble for the equivalent of three city blocks) before hitting the Creighton Municipal Airport, where several buildings were either heavily damaged or destroyed, including three hangars receiving roof, garage, and siding damage and a storage building losing its roof. The airport beacon was blown away as well. The tornado then took a track to the northwest, where a 10,000-bushel grain bin was completely destroyed, and five more irrigation systems where destroyed. Many trees were downed, and power poles snapped at their base as well.
EF2	SW of Macy, NE to E of Bronson, IA	Thurston (NE), Monona (IA), Woodbury (IA)	NE, IA	42.0805°N 96.3861°W	2255 – 2347	25.62 mi (41.23 km)	250 yd (230 m)	This long-tracked, strong tornado began southwest of Macy before moving through the town. Six homes in the town were either heavily damaged or destroyed, while twelve more homes and one business sustained minor damage. Numerous vehicles, a center pivot irrigation system, and several buildings at farmsteads were damaged as well. The tornado crossed the Missouri River into Iowa west-northwest of Whiting and continued north-northeastward to the west of Sloan, where it spawned the EF1 satellite tornado listed below. Two buildings were destroyed southeast of Salix and open-air buildings were severely damaged at a dairy farm east of Salix. Other homes and buildings were either severely damaged or destroyed between Salix and Bronson before the tornado lifted just east of Bronson. Many trees and four power poles were downed, and corn crops were flattened along the path. Two people were injured, both in Thurston County.
EF0	ESE of Allen	Dixon	NE	42.3941°N 96.7337°W	2259 – 2301	0.68 mi (1.09 km)	50 yd (46 m)	A brief tornado caused no damage.
EF1	W of Sloan	Woodbury	IA	42.2206°N 96.2633°W	2317 – 2320	1.17 mi (1.88 km)	100 yd (91 m)	This was a satellite tornado to the long-tracked EF2 tornado listed above. Trees were downed and farm buildings were either damaged or destroyed.
EF1	NNW of Jackson, NE to SSE of Jefferson, SD	Dakota (NE), Union (SD)	NE, SD	42.4918°N 96.59°W	2325 – 2335	5.89 mi (9.48 km)	400 yd (370 m)	A tornado touched down in Dakota County, causing no damage before crossing the Missouri River into South Dakota. It then damaged homes, overturned an irrigation system, and downed many trees in a subdivision west of McCook Lake before dissipating. One of the homes had a collapsed chimney, carport, porch roof, and walls of a garage, and at least four other houses had roof, siding, and/or gutter damage.
EF1	NE of Jefferson, SD	Union (SD), Plymouth (IA)	SD, IA	42.570°N 96.5562°W	2335 – 2345	6.47 mi (10.41 km)	800 yd (730 m)	This tornado touched down south of Jefferson just after the previous tornado lifted, damaging a feedlot before crossing I-29. The roof and gutters of a house and the walls and roof of at least two storage equipment buildings were severely damaged, a road sign was damaged, several grain bins were either blown over or crushed, trees and power poles were downed, and corn crops were flattened. One of the grain bins was wrapped around a house, causing damage to the roof, siding, and gutters of the house. The tornado tracked in total for 3 miles (4.8 km) in South Dakota before crossing the Big Sioux River into Plymouth County, Iowa and lifting 5 miles (8.0 km) northeast of Jefferson after causing no damage.
EF4	SW of Climbing Hill to W of Washta	Woodbury, Cherokee	IA	42.3319°N 96.1086°W	2335 – 0017	24.94 mi (40.14 km)	2,600 yd (2,400 m)	This very large, violent tornado tracked northeast through rural Woodbury and Cherokee counties, moving west and north of Climbing Hill, southeast of Moville and Pierson, and northwest of Correctionville before dissipating west of Washta. Numerous houses were either heavily damaged or destroyed, with some losing their entire roofs, having collapse of walls, and being shifted off of their foundations. Many sheds, outbuildings, barns, silos, pieces of farm equipment, and garages were destroyed, and a car was thrown 30 feet (9.1 m). Farm equipment was tossed about 400 yards (370 m) at a farmstead south of Pierson, including a large grain cart that put gouges in a road and had its axle and wheels broken off, and many trees and power lines were downed along the path.
EF1	NW of Hinton	Plymouth	IA	42.6758°N 96.4453°W	2350 – 2352	1.11 mi (1.79 km)	100 yd (91 m)	Farm buildings were damaged, and trees were downed.
EF0	E of Adaville	Plymouth	IA	42.7464°N 96.3815°W	2355 – 2356	1.28 mi (2.06 km)	50 yd (46 m)	A brief tornado downed several trees.
EF0	NNE of Quimby	Cherokee	IA	42.6879°N 95.622°W	0041 – 0043	0.55 mi (0.89 km)	50 yd (46 m)	A brief tornado caused no damage.
EF0	SW of Cherokee	Cherokee	IA	42.7167°N 95.5901°W	0046 – 0047	0.4 mi (640 m)	50 yd (46 m)	A brief tornado caused no damage.
EF0	NE of Cherokee	Cherokee	IA	42.836°N 95.3967°W	0118 – 0119	0.34 mi (550 m)	50 yd (46 m)	A brief tornado to the east-southeast of Larrabee caused no damage.
EF1	SSW of Alta	Buena Vista	IA	42.6032°N 95.3649°W	0133 – 0142	5.45 mi (8.77 km)	200 yd (180 m)	This tornado touched down 5 miles (8.0 km) south-southwest of Alta and ended just outside the south side of town. A few farmsteads were damaged, with a drive-thru garage and several outbuildings suffering significant damage at one farmstead, farm equipment being damaged, a school suffering roof and air conditioning damage, and a baseball complex sustaining considerable damage, including to bleachers.
EF0	NW of Webb	Clay	IA	42.978°N 95.0574°W	0147 – 0148	0.71 mi (1.14 km)	100 yd (91 m)	A brief tornado to the south-southwest of Gillett Grove downed a few trees.

=== October 5 event ===
List of confirmed tornadoes – Saturday, October 5, 2013
EF#	Location	County / Parish	State	Start Coord.	Time (UTC)	Path length	Max width	Summary
EF0	W of Endeavor	Marquette	WI	43.70°N 89.477°W	2323 – 2330	1.78 mi (2.86 km)	50 yd (46 m)	Numerous trees were snapped along this tornado's path, including one the fell on and destroyed a vehicle and damaged the roof of a house. Other homes had shingle damage, and a section of metal was peeled off of the roof of a farmhouse. Corn crops were downed, a farm building was damaged, and a boat was moved as well.
EF0	SW of Obion	Obion	TN	36.2344°N 89.2485°W	2352 – 2353	0.18 mi (0.29 km)	25 yd (23 m)	A brief tornado in an open field just north of the Obion River caused no damage.

=== October 7 event ===
List of confirmed tornadoes – Monday, October 7, 2013
EF#	Location	County / Parish	State	Start Coord.	Time (UTC)	Path length	Max width	Summary
EF1	Paramus	Bergen	NJ	40.9317°N 74.0926°W	1916 – 1918	1.25 mi (2.01 km)	100 yd (91 m)	Trees were downed in George Washington Memorial Park (a cemetery) and across adjoining golf courses – the Paramus Golf Course and the Ridgewood Country Club.

=== Wayne–Wakefield, Nebraska ===
Wayne–Wakefield, Nebraska
Meteorological history
- Formed: October 4, 2013, 4:12 p.m. CST (UTC–06:00)
- Dissipated: October 4, 2013, 4:53 p.m. CST (UTC–06:00)
- Duration: 41 minutes

EF4 tornado
- on the Enhanced Fujita scale
- Highest winds: 170 mph (270 km/h)

Overall effects
- Fatalities: 0
- Injuries: 15
- Damage: $50.5 million (2013 USD)
- Areas affected: Wayne County, Nebraska, US

A large multiple-vortex tornado, the first EF4 tornado in Nebraska since May 22, 2004, caused substantial damage along its path. Two farmsteads were struck southwest of Wayne, and many sheds and barns were either damaged or destroyed. Two homes in this area sustained EF3-strength damage as well. The tornado moved into the east side of Wayne, causing severe damage to a softball complex, damaging farm equipment at a dealership, and either damaging or completely destroying many large industrial metal buildings at an industrial park, some of which were either badly mangled or completely reduced to rubble. At this point, the tornado had reached its peak intensity, with widespread EF3 damage, and a few pockets of EF4-strength damage were noted. It then directly hit the Wayne Municipal Airport, where two hangars were flattened, leading to the destruction of 15 planes, and the AWOS was shredded and scattered over unknown distances. The tornado then caused EF2-type damage to another farmstead before crossing into Dixon County, where it narrowed, weakened, and eventually dissipated after causing roof, window, and siding damage to a few more houses, overturning a camper, and either heavily damaging or destroying a grain bin and numerous farm buildings, as well as farm equipment. Many trees were downed, and crops were flattened along the path. Fifteen people were injured by the tornado. John Dunning, Chief Information Officer of Wayne State College, was critically injured, but has since recovered. He would have likely died had he stayed in his truck. This tornado caused $50.5 million, mainly in Wayne. This became the first F4/EF4 tornado in October in the US since the Windsor Locks, Connecticut tornado of 1979, and the first tornado in Nebraska in October since 2001.

== See also ==
- List of North American tornadoes and tornado outbreaks
- Weather of 2013
- List of wettest tropical cyclones in the United States
- November 2009 nor'easter – Developed from the remnants of Hurricane Ida in the Gulf of Mexico, before later developing into a nor'easter
