= Alpine storms =

Weather phenomenon in mountain areas

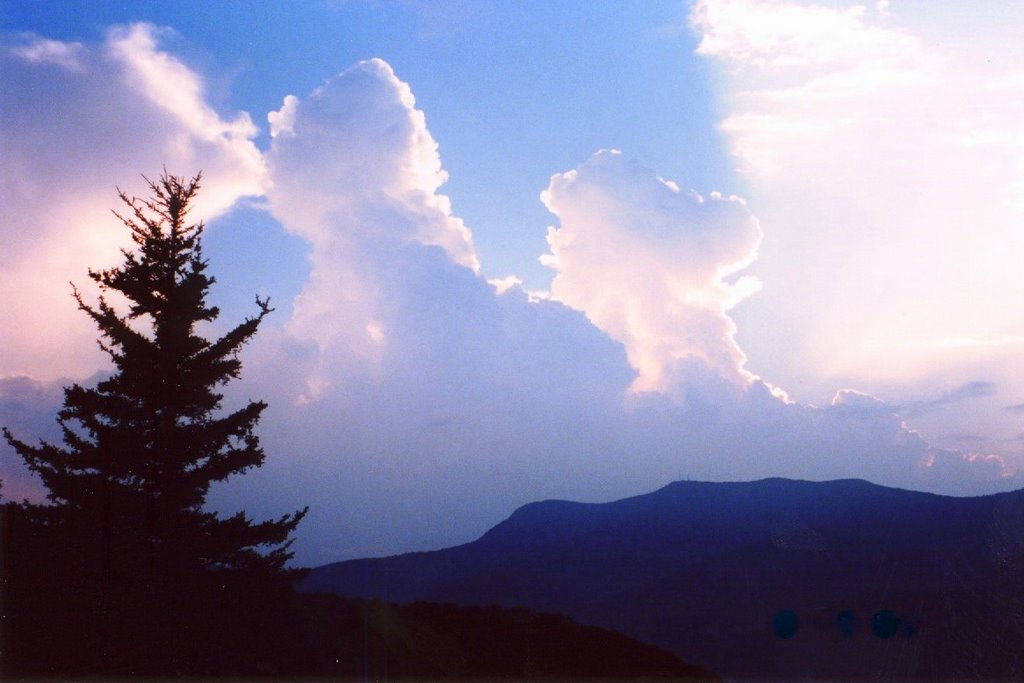
Cumulonimbus rising above the Black Mountains (North Carolina).

Mountain thunderstorms pose significant risks because of their consequences, especially for mountaineers, hikers and paragliders. Despite monitoring weather conditions to prevent accidents, disasters occurring during such phenomena often remain unpredictable and are the subject of novels or other stories.

== Formation ==
Formation of a cold front when the air in an uplift is stable or can not reach the top of the obstacle. The air is forced over the front and causes the formation of a low level jet stream .

Thunderstorms are formed when air in a layer of the atmosphere is unstable. A parcel of air raised at the base of this layer is then warmer than the environment and rises. In rising, its temperature decreases by adiabatic expansion, and when the relative humidity of water vapor reaches saturation, this forms a convective cloud. To form a storm, this layer must be very large and the temperature at the top of the cloud must be below −20C.

Mountains can help trigger atmospheric convection in three ways:

- direct lifting at the level of free convection in unstable air, lifting with a synoptic wind that arrives w/ a component perpendicular to the slopes. The air is forced up the slope and into convection;
- thermal forcing in an unstable situation where there is weak general circulation and diurnal warming. The mountain breezes then generate anabatic winds which also rise.
- dynamic forcing when air is stable lower down, and circulation is blocked by the mountain, but the air is unstable at higher altitude. In this case general circulation is forced above this blocking layer and can reach the convective layer.

In a more general case, several effects may be present and if the synoptic wind is opposed to the anabatic wind, additional convergence occurs at the top of the mountain. It is also possible to create a convergence zone behind the mountain when the synoptic wind can divide and go around it to meet again (ex. Puget Sound Convergence Zone ) that will promote convection.

The uprising serves to not only destabilize the air and form convective clouds, but also to enhance its intensity. As the rising air from the bottom of the slopes is hotter and humid than the surrounding air, the lifted index will be more negative, increasing the vertical extension of the cloud . A simple temperature difference of 2C is enough to greatly aggravate the violence of thunderstorms.

== Special phenomena ==
Mountain storms have particularities because of the proximity of clouds, the importance of electric fields, their rapidity of appearance, their particular danger. Sudden wind lift of a mass of air can radically change the initial conditions within them.

=== Immediate consequences ===
Observable phenomena give an idea of the peculiarities of mountain storms .

Mountaineers are the most exposed to these phenomena, in ridges and pass passes.

In addition to the common phenomena related to the storm, larger electric fields cause unexpected warning signs related to the ionization of the air. French mountaineers say they hear "bees": suddenly, on all surfaces, are small noisy discharges. After this bee-sound, another observation is that the hair stands straight up over the head, and sparks can form between the teeth when one opens one's mouth. These are the results of electrical phenomena, already described in other situations, and known by the name of fire of St. Elmo or corona effect also called crown effect.

Climbers, not very mobile, can find themselves trapped in a storm. The metal ice axes of climbing equipment can attract lightning, a great danger in these situations.

=== Indirect consequences ===
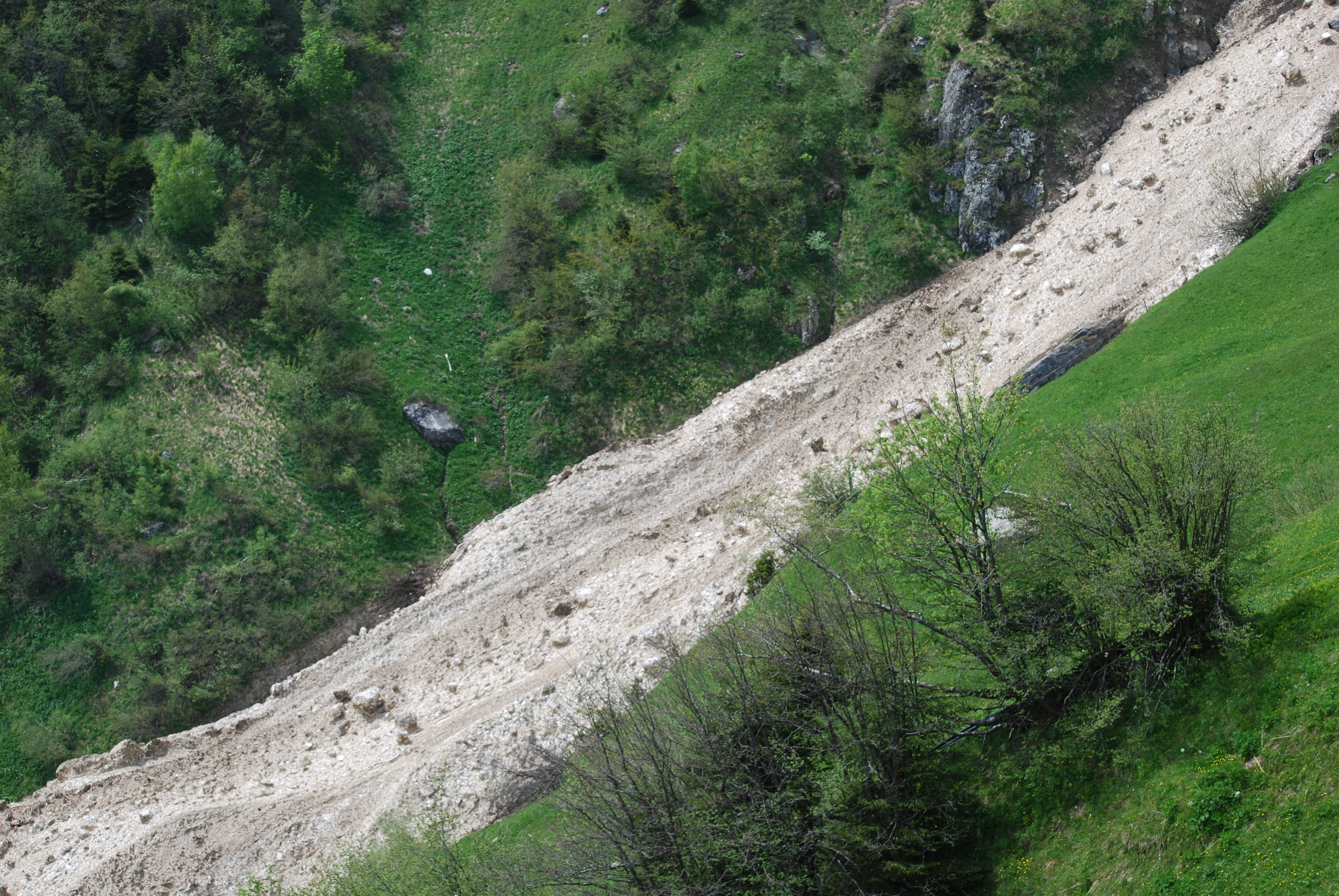
Torrential flood in the canton of Uri, Switzerland .

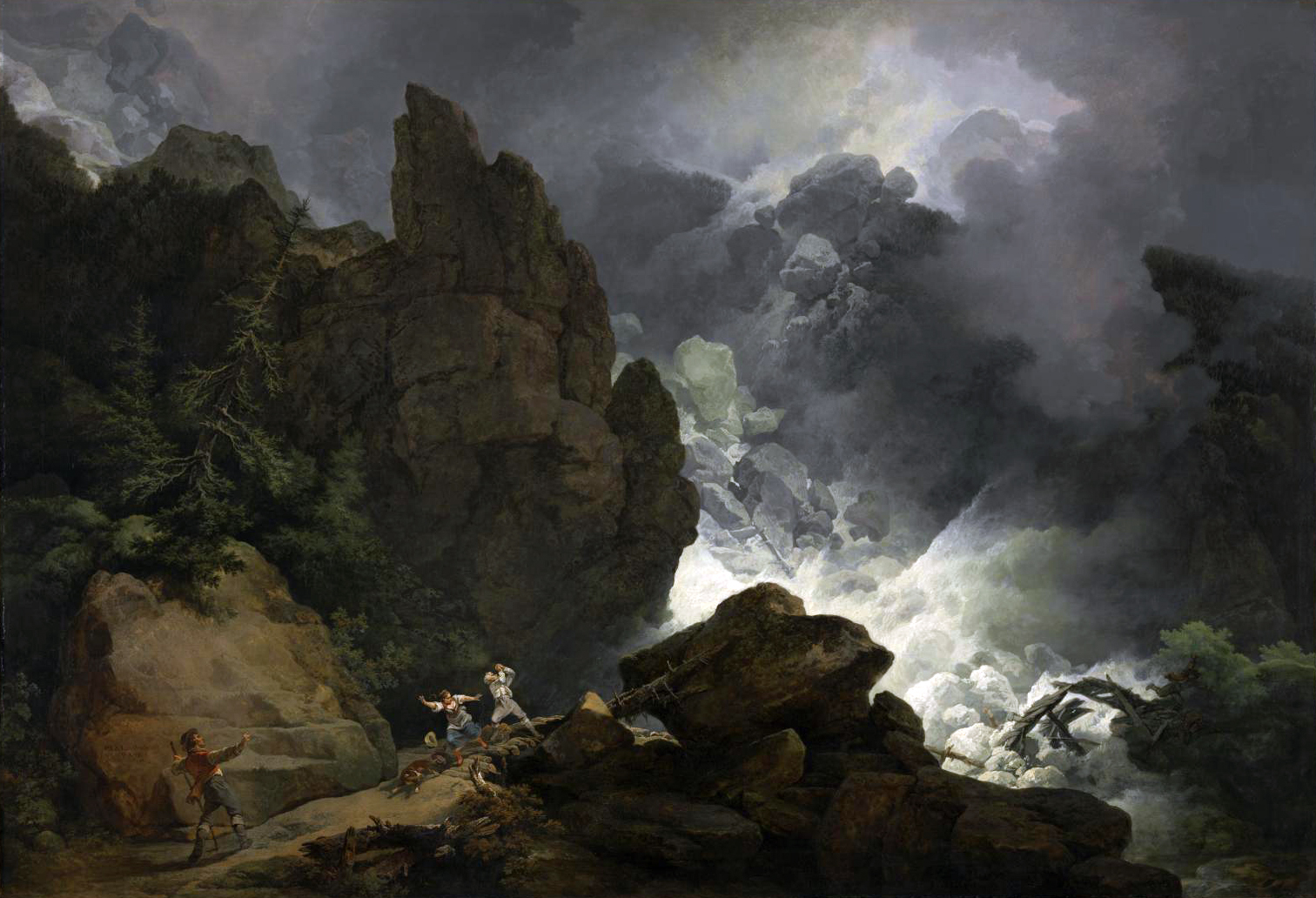
An Avalanche in the Alps by Philip James de Loutherbourg, 1803

The force of thunder, lightning, lightning, rain, hail, bursts and whirlwinds can cause other dangerous situations. Some natural phenomena are increased tenfold by altitude, in particular:

- torrential floods down slopes at rapid speeds
- landslides,
- avalanches.

== Forecasting ==
In the United States, the National Weather Service provides forecasts for every point in its territory, including the mountainous areas. In other countries, similar services and guidance are provided by the Meteorological Service of Canada, by the UK Met Office, and by Météo France in France. France also maintains a Safe Mountain Foundation and Keraunos, an observatory for violent storms.

Forecasts help climbers avoid alpine storms, but they must also know how to stay safe if they encounter a storm.

== Stories of mountain storms in literature ==
=== Novel ===
- Premier de cordée (First on the Rope) by Roger Frison-Roche touched on the spectacle of mountain climbing and the experience of high mountain guides in these extreme situations. It was adapted to the cinema in a 1944 film by Louis Daquin with Maurice Baquet; and to a television movie in 1999, directed by Pierre-Antoine Hiroz and Edouard Niermans.

=== Autobiographies ===
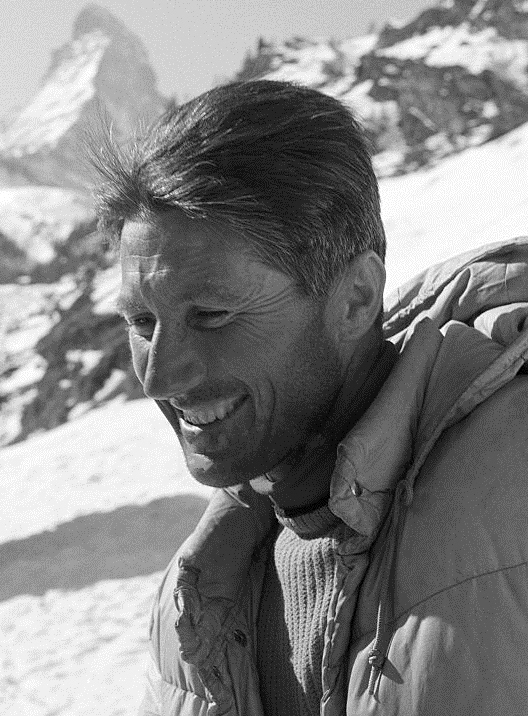
Walter Bonatti in 1965

A number of mountaineers in the 20th century wrote autobiographical accounts of being caught in mountain storms.

- The Conquerors of the useless by Lionel Terray: Surprised during the ascent of Mount Maudit, the author writes "At the beginning of the afternoon, as we approached the summit, the storm burst on us, sparks of sparks were formed above the pompons of our hats and I felt again the panic fear provoked in me by these outbursts of nature. "
- The famous British climber Chris Bonington said: "I have often bivouacked to wait for the good weather, spent nights in the storm ... In a storm, there is nothing to do but sit, wait for it to pass... ".
- Montagne pour un homme nu (Mountain for a naked man), by Pierre Mazeaud. This book reports the tragedy on Mont Blanc on July 11, 1961, where seven mountaineers were surprised by a violent storm on the pillar of Frêney, near the summit of Mont Blanc. One hundred and ten hours later, a helicopter landed three survivors at Courmayeur; among them Walter Bonatti and Mazeaud.

About the 1961 disaster, Mazeaud wrote: "Sitting on my stirrups, I use my piton, when I hear a striking ring somewhat resembling the phone. My companions, forty meters below, prick up their ears. Soon, I feel pain in my fingers, sparks run on my hammer. The carabiners on my shoulder stick to my fingers (...) A pendulum swing puts me near Pierrot, when a flash of a surprising glow hits him in the face, exactly in the ear where his hearing aid blackens. He falls into my arms, haggard, disgusted, without reaction". He also noted that Pierre Kohlmann was not killed instantly but the shock seemed to make him lose his mind. During the several days that it took to descend, he did not say a word, finally collapsing just before reaching the entrance, the last victim of the storm that killed four mountaineers.

== See also ==
- Thunderstorm
- Severe weather
- Saint Elmo's fire
- Corona discharge
- Avalanche
- Rain shadow
- Orographic lift

== Bibliography ==
- Thillet, Jean-Jacques; Schueller, Dominique (2009). Petit manuel de météo montagne. Topo guides. Glénat. p. 192. ISBN 978-2723463195.
- Cotton, William R; Bryan, George H; van den Heever, Susan C (2011). Storm and Cloud Dynamics. International geophysics series. Vol. 99 (Second ed.). Academic Press. p. 807. ISBN 978-0-12-0885428.
