= 2013 Wayne tornado =

EF4 tornado in 2013

- The tornado at EF3 intensity near Wayne.

Meteorological history
- Formed: October 4, 2013, 4:12 p.m. CST (UTC–06:00)
- Dissipated: October 4, 2013, 4:53 p.m. CST (UTC–06:00)
- Duration: 41 minutes

EF4 tornado
- on the Enhanced Fujita scale
- Highest winds: 170 mph (270 km/h)

Overall effects
- Fatalities: 0
- Injuries: 15
- Damage: $50.5 million (2013 USD)
- Areas affected: Wayne County, Nebraska, US
- Part of the October 2013 North American storm complex and Tornadoes of 2013

During the afternoon hours of October 4, 2013, a large and violent multiple-vortex tornado moved across several counties located in rural Nebraska. The tornado injured fifteen and inflicted $50.5 million (2013 USD) in damages along a 18.94 mi (30.48 km) path.

The tornado first touched down in rural Wayne County, rapidly intensifying as it approached the city of Wayne. The tornado would reach EF4 intensity in Wayne, where it destroyed an airport and several homes, while damaging large warehouses. The tornado would slowly weaken as it left the town, dissipating 41 minutes after it first touched down.

== Meteorological synopsis ==
The same powerful storm system that produced severe weather across eastern Nebraska on October 3 remained in the area the following day. A strong area of low pressure moved from eastern Colorado into southern South Dakota during the day. As this occurred, a dry line was sweeping across central and into eastern Nebraska. A warm front continued to lift north into northeast Nebraska and western Iowa by late afternoon. With unseasonably warm and moist air in the region the atmosphere became strongly unstable.

This instability coupled with a strong wind field associated with the powerful storm system and created and environment favorable for significant severe weather. Supercells developed near the intersection of the dry line and warm front over northeast Nebraska during the afternoon and tracked northeast. The supercells were responsible for large hail, damaging winds, and significant tornadoes. Other isolated thunderstorms developed south along the dry line into western Iowa producing very large hail and damaging winds throughout the evening of October 4.

== Tornado summary ==
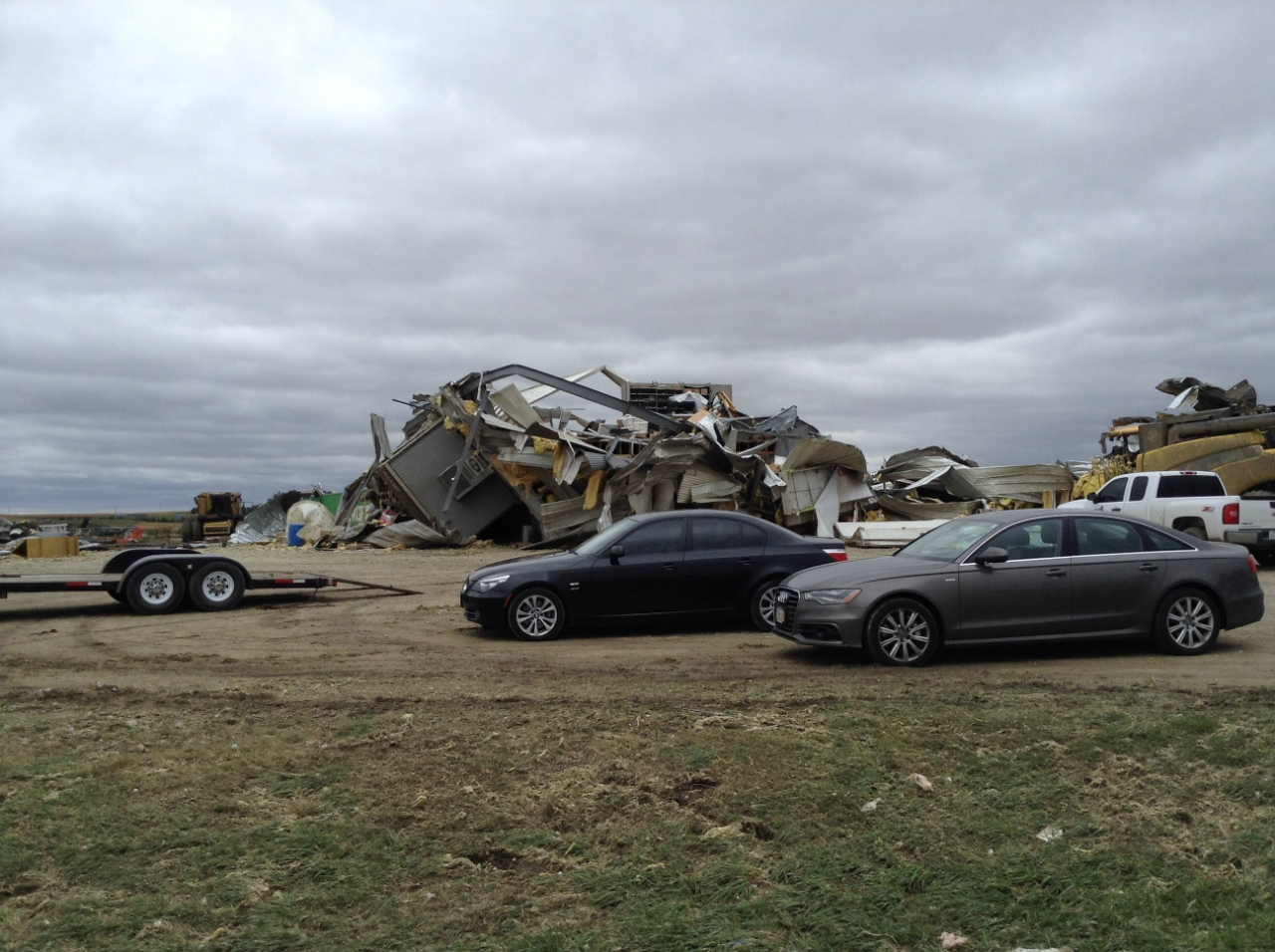
EF4 damage to a building in Wayne

The tornado first touched down southwest of Brenna at 4:12 pm CST, moving to the northeast. Trees were immediately snapped at EF1 intensity as the tornado began to strengthen, and before passing north of Brenna the tornado sped up, reaching 45 mph (72 km/h). The tornado would also flatten cornrows in this area, while continuing to move to the northeast, a direction it would take for the rest of its life. The tornado would continue to produce EF0 and EF1-rated damage while moving through rural areas of Wayne County. EF2 damage was first observed when the tornado destroyed a barn located near 851st Road, and at around the same time grew to 1.25 mi (2.01 km) in width.

More damage was documented south of Wayne, where the tornado was on a direct track to. Multiple barns were damaged and cornfields were flattened as the tornado moved northeast, before crossing Nebraska Highway 15 and destroying several homes at EF3 intensity. One home, located on the eastern side of the highway, was swept away in 152 mph (245 km/h) winds.

As the tornado moved into the city limits of Wayne, it rapidly strengthened to EF4 intensity, crossing the South Logan Creek before turning to the east. The tornado moved through residential areas, flattening several homes and destroying a steel building at EF4 intensity. Numerous other warehouses in the area sustained severe damage. The Grossenburg Implement, a John Deere tractor dealership, was also destroyed. The tornado would then impact the Wayne Municipal Airport, destroying two hangars and fifteen large aircraft. Two staff members were located on the runway of the airport prior to the tornado, but took shelter before it hit the area.

Two men who were attempting to escape the tornado in a drainage ditch took a direct hit, and were thrown 30 yd (27 m) away, sustaining severe injuries. The tornado continued to move through the southeast portions of the town, striking numerous barns and farmhouses as it weakened to EF2 intensity. It would continue to move through rural Dixon County, before dissipating northwest of Wakefield.

== Aftermath ==
Fifteen people were injured by the tornado, the vast majority of which were located in Wayne. The town was hard-hit, and many buildings located on the southeast side of the town were either damaged or completely destroyed, including at least 10 homes. The tornado left $50.5 million (2013 USD) in damages. The tornado was the first to become violent within Nebraska since 2004, and was the strongest tornado to ever hit Nebraska in October. (Note: As of November 2024)

== See also ==
- 2014 Pilger, Nebraska, tornado family

== Notes and references ==
=== Sources ===
- Narramore-Nelson, Jen; Wilkes, Tucker-Nick (October 3, 2020). "Wayne, NE EF4 tornado - October 4, 2013". Tornado Talk.
- "Storm Events Database". National Weather Service / NOAA – via National Weather Service.
