= March 12–15, 2018 nor'easter =

North American winter storm in 2018

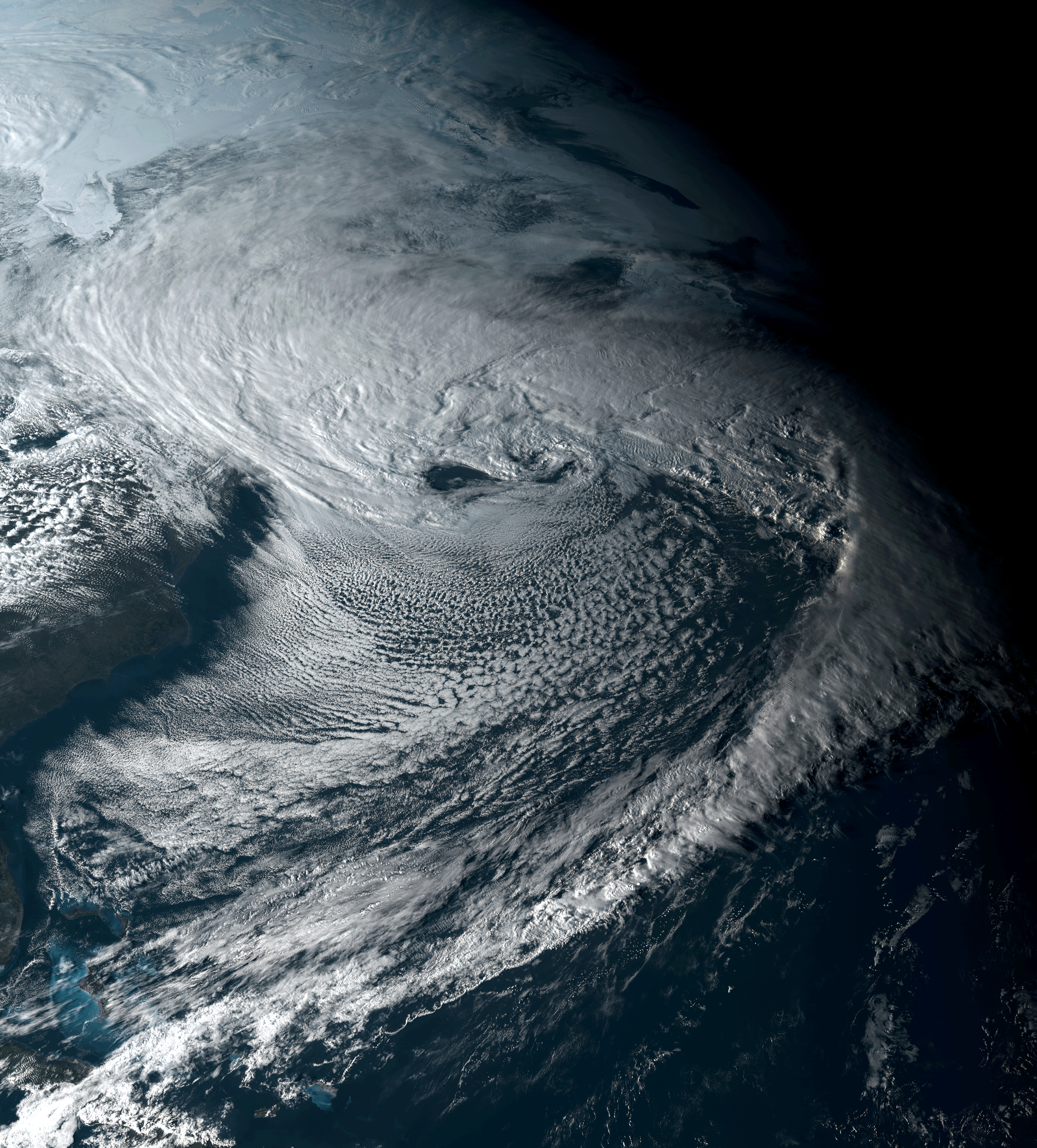
- Satellite image of the nor'easter traversing across the Northeastern United States on March 13, 2018

Meteorological history
- Formed: March 10, 2018
- Dissipated: March 15, 2018

Category 2 "Minor" winter storm
- Regional snowfall index: 4.34 (NOAA)
- Lowest pressure: 968 mbar (hPa); 28.59 inHg
- Max. snowfall: 50 in (130 cm) in Woodford, Vermont

Overall effects
- Fatalities: 1
- Injuries: 3
- Damage: >$729,000
- Areas affected: Midwestern, Southern and Northeastern United States
- Power outages: >258,000
- Part of the 2017–18 North American winter

The March 12–15, 2018 nor'easter, unofficially named Winter Storm Skylar by The Weather Channel, brought widespread blizzard conditions across the Northeastern United States, particularly New England in mid-March 2018. First impacting the Midwestern and Southern United States on March 11–12, causing travel impacts and producing high snowfall totals, the winter storm then moved into the Northeastern United States and became a nor'easter, producing blizzard conditions and heavy snowfall across portions of the interior Northeast on March 13–15. Heavy snow fell in Massachusetts, where most of the state received at least one foot of snow; the storm brought the heaviest March snow on record in Boston and Worcester. Over two feet of snow were reported in portions of Massachusetts, peaking at 31 inches (79 cm) in Wilmington. Heavy snow also fell in Rhode Island, where the snowfall peaked at 25.1 inches (64 cm) in Foster.

A storm surge of 3 feet (0.91 m) was reported on Nantucket while a 2.8 feet (0.85 m) storm surge was recorded in Boston. Over a foot of snow was reported in portions of New Hampshire, with Deerfield receiving almost 29 inches (74 cm) and Middleton reporting 28 inches (71 cm). The winter storm moved into Canada, causing additional power outages and producing snowfall totals of over 10 inches (25 cm) in some locations. Of the four nor'easters that impacted the Northeast in March, this nor'easter was the strongest in terms of minimum pressure, at least 968 millibars (28.6 inHg). The heaviest snow fell in southern Vermont, with Woodford receiving 50 inches (130 cm) of snow.

== Meteorological history ==
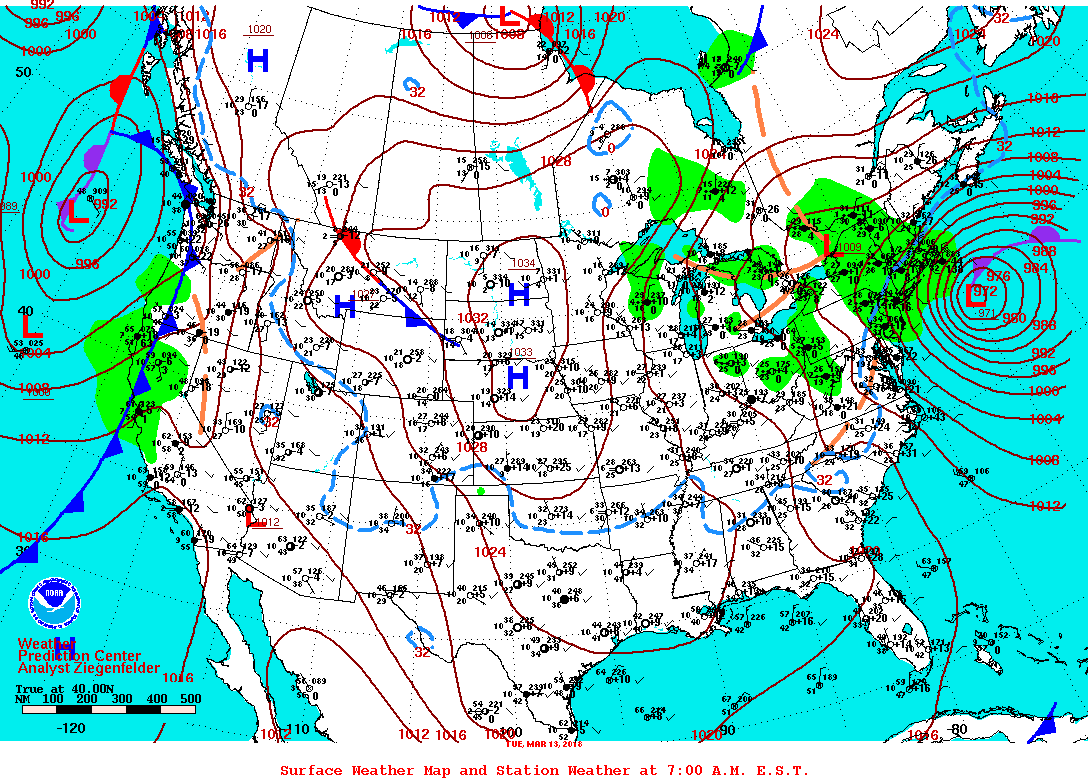
A surface observation map depicting the nor'easter off the coast of the Northeastern United States on March 13

On March 10, a disturbance was located across portions of the Great Plains, bringing snowfall. The next day, a low-pressure area in the Mid-Mississippi River valley brought additional snowfall across portions of the region, and then moved into the Appalachian Mountains. A separate, more dominant area of low-pressure also developed offshore of the Mid-Atlantic coastline, which then moved northeast on March 13. Rapid deepening then commenced overnight, with its central pressure dropping to at least 968 millibars (28.6 inHg), (Note: Sources conflict on this. The National Weather Service Albany, New York states that the pressure of the low dropped to 968 millibars, however The Weather Channel's source states that it dropped to 966 millibars.) and a separate upper-level low trekked into areas near the New York/Pennsylvania border, causing heavy snowfall to occur across portions of the Northeastern United States, mostly focused along the New England portion of the coast.

As it strengthened, this also caused blizzard conditions across portions of the region, including areas in Massachusetts and Rhode Island, and causing high snow accumulations. A low-level convergence zone, combined with strong upper-level lift, continued snowfall across the same region in the evening hours of March 13, some heavy at times. The next day, snowfall was limited to areas downstream of lakes and in higher elevations as the upper-level low moved into New England, and by March 15, the moisture became limited as upper-level low pressure area moved into Canada. The system dissipated soon thereafter.

== Preparations and impact ==
=== Midwestern United States ===
In Perry County, Indiana, trees and power lines were down as 5 inches (13 cm) of snow fell. Snow fell as far north as Huntingburg, Indiana, where 1.7 inches (4.3 cm) of snow was recorded, and the heaviest snow in Indiana fell near Leopold, with 6 inches (15 cm). Several states across the Midwest also received snowfall, with the heaviest snowfall across the states being 6 inches (15 cm) in Herald, Illinois, 5 inches (13 cm) near Wright City, Missouri, 4.5 inches (11 cm) near Centerville, Iowa, and 3.5 inches (8.9 cm) in Hiram, Ohio. Damage totaled $60,000 across the Midwest, including $30,000 each in Illinois and Indiana.

=== Southern United States ===
Damages in the southern United States totaled $125,000 (2018 USD).

==== Kentucky ====
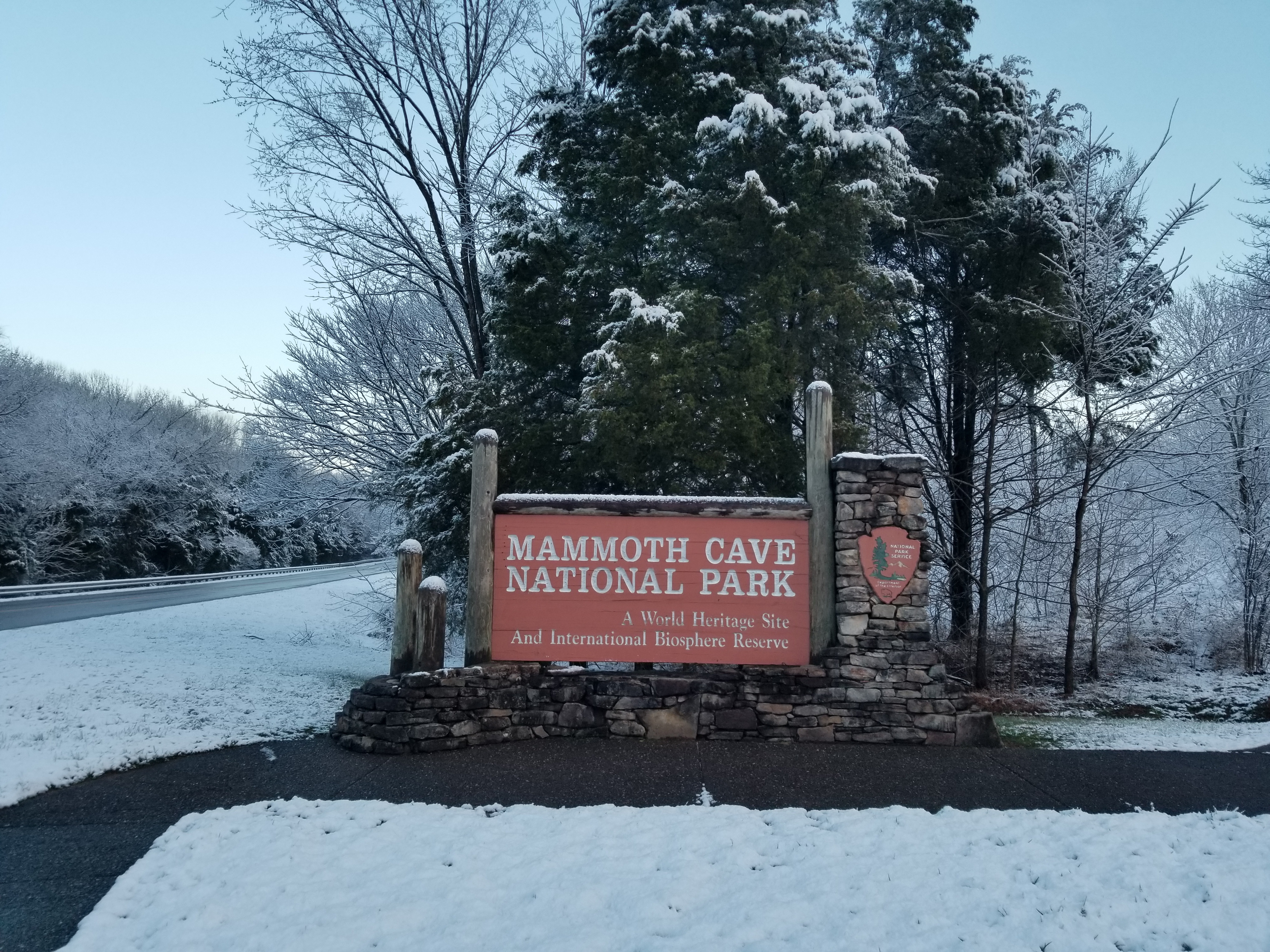
Snow at the entrance of Mammoth Cave National Park on March 12

Southeast of Lexington, 10.5 inches (27 cm) of snow fell as numerous school districts were closed. Four injuries occurred after separate car accidents, and there was an additional 70 non-injury car crashes. Portions of Interstate 75 were closed as several multi-car crashes occurred, including an injury crash on the Clays Ferry Bridge. In Powell County, a 40-car pileup occurred on the Mountain Parkway, which led to an hour-long closure of the roadway. Louisville International Airport received 2.4 inches (6.1 cm) of snow, and numerous trees and power lines were down across the state. Kentucky Public Service Commission reported nearly 27,200 power outages, and Kentucky Utilities reported 967 outages.

==== North Carolina ====
Winter weather advisories were in effect for central portions of the state. Sleet and freezing rain mixed with snow, causing hazardous road conditions and sleet accumulations. Across the state, 40 school districts had early dismissals, delayed openings, or were closed. The highest snowfall total in the state occurred at Mount Mitchell State Park, where 9 inches (23 cm) of snow fell. A 69 miles per hour (111 km/h) wind gust was recorded at Jennettes Pier, while a 65 miles per hour (105 km/h) wind gust occurred at Oregon Inlet Coast Guard Station. The mixed precipitation also impacted roads, which resulted in one death.

==== Elsewhere ====
Across the Nashville metropolitan area in Tennessee, mixed precipitation fell, with rain changing to snow, which led to snow accumulations around 1–2 inches (2.5–5.1 cm) across northern portions of the metropolitan area. The highest snow accumulation in Tennessee was in Roan Mountain, which recorded 7 inches (18 cm).

=== Northeastern United States ===
Damages in the northeastern United States totaled $544,000 (2018 USD).

==== Massachusetts ====
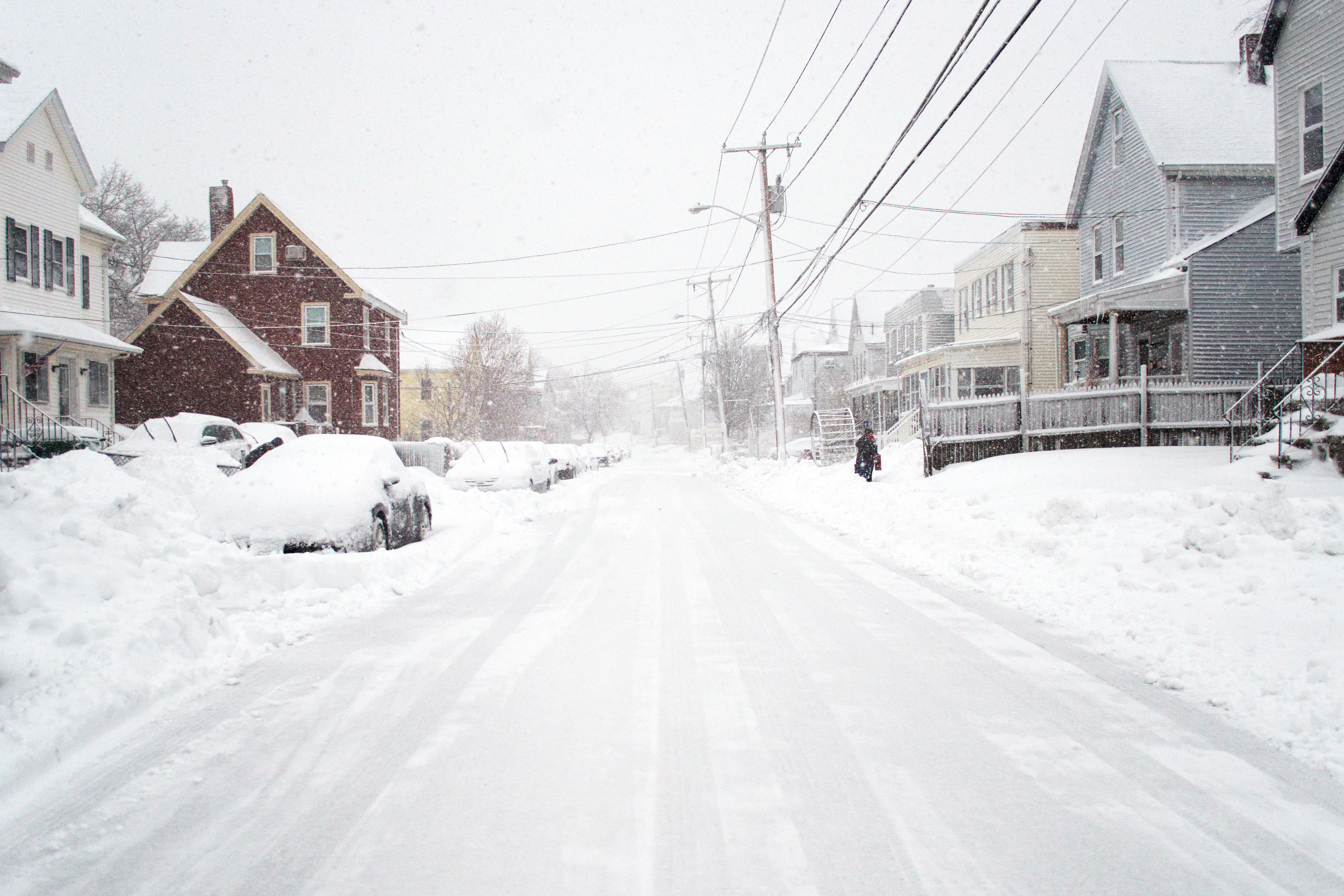
A snow-covered road in Medford, Massachusetts

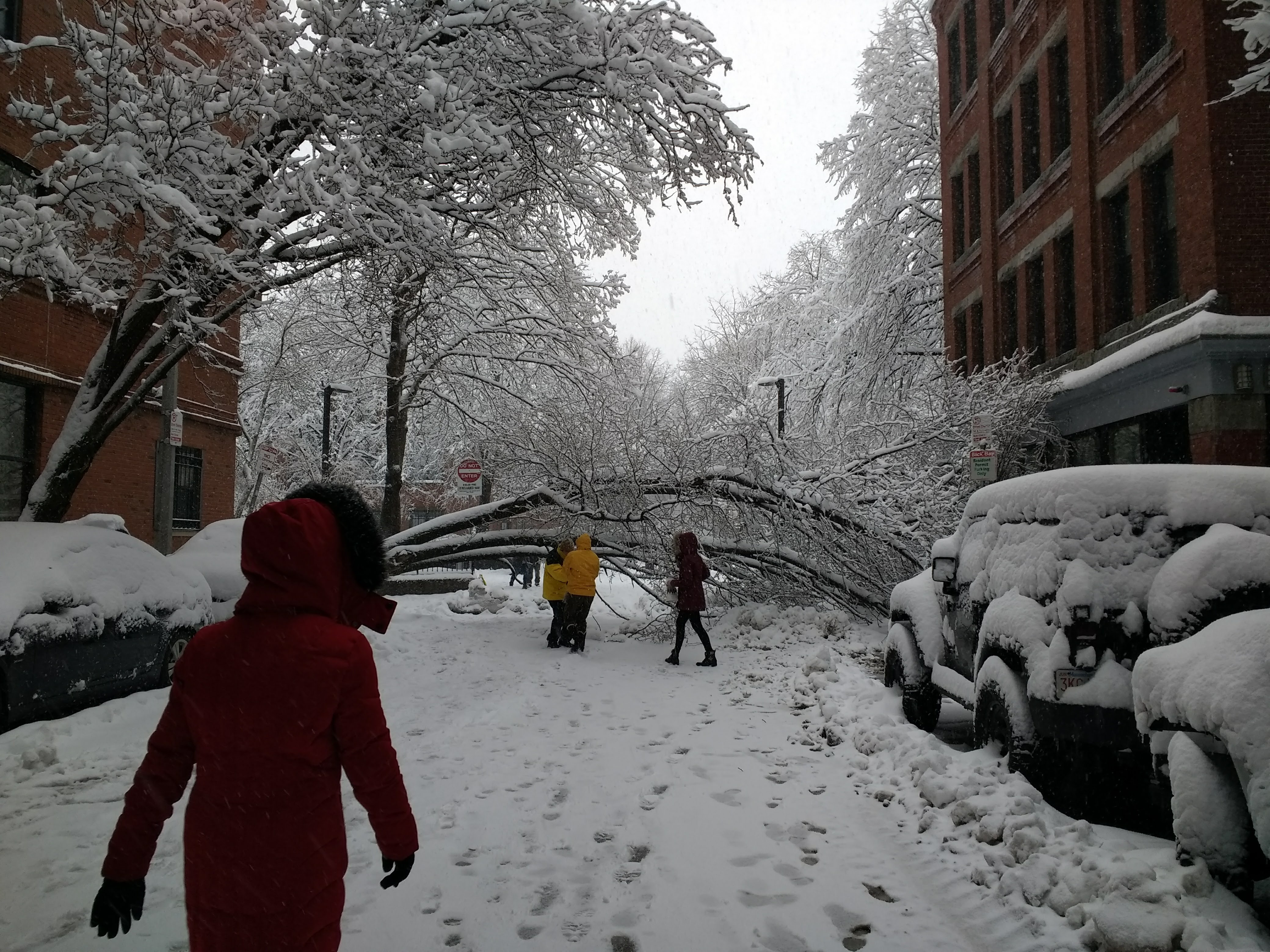
A downed tree in Back Bay, Massachusetts

Schools were cancelled across several school districts, including Boston Public Schools. State offices across the state were closed, along with the Boston Public Library and its branches. Amtrak service from Boston to New York City was suspended. MBTA ferry service was suspended, and MBTA buses were on snow routes. Service was reduced on the MBTA subway, and the Mattapan Line was replaced with bus shuttles. The high-occupancy vehicle lane of Interstate 93 between Boston and Quincy was closed. Boston mayor Marty Walsh declared a snow emergency in advance of the approaching winter storm, and issued a parking ban. Snow emergencies and parking bans were also in place in Cambridge, Danvers, Lowell, and New Bedford. National Weather Service Taunton, Massachusetts meteorologist Kim Buttrick stated "This one's main impact is going to be snow."

Blizzard conditions occurred across portions of the state, including areas in Boston, Hyannis, Falmouth, Plymouth, Marshfield, and Martha's Vineyard, bringing wind gusts around 55–65 miles per hour (89–105 km/h) and high snowfall totals, with Wilmington receiving 31 inches (79 cm) of snow and Methuen recording 28.3 inches (72 cm) of snowfall. Along the Atlantic coast, coastal flooding occurred on roadways in Marshfield and Scituate. Wind gusts up to 81 miles per hour (130 km/h) occurred as well along the coastline in East Falmouth. Worcester Regional Airport received 21.8 inches (55 cm), and was closed, along with Worcester Public Schools. A portion of the Massachusetts Turnpike (Interstate 90) was closed near Charlton due to a jackknifed tractor-trailer as speed restrictions were in place on the interstate. Across the state, as widespread trees and wires were downed, more than 230,000 power outages occurred, and 840 flights were cancelled at Logan International Airport, where 14.8 inches (38 cm) of snow fell. The American Red Cross opened three shelters in Hyannis, Fall River, and Plympton.

==== New Hampshire ====
Numerous schools and state offices were closed in New Hampshire, and Rockingham Park, along with The Mall of New Hampshire and Pheasant Lane Mall, were closed or closed early. American Airlines suspended flights and operations in Manchester, and several car crashes also occurred across the state. After the winter storm, on June 8, United States president Donald Trump approved a disaster declaration for Carroll, Rockingham, and Strafford counties in New Hampshire.

==== Connecticut ====
Numerous school districts closed schools, including in Hartford, and state offices were also closed. American Airlines suspended flights and operations in New Haven. Parking bans were also issued, and a winter storm warning was issued for the entire state. At Bradley International Airport, 75 percent of all flights on March 13 were cancelled. There were nearly 1,800 power outages, and 77 car accidents occurred across the state, including two injuries, and Massachusetts State Police responded to 810 service calls. The heaviest snowfall fell in Scotland, which recorded 26 inches (66 cm) of snow, while Oakdale received 23 inches (58 cm) of snow.

==== Elsewhere ====
Several schools across Rhode Island closed, including Chariho Regional School District and schools in Providence. Most of the state received at least 12 inches (30 cm) of snow as blizzard conditions occurred. Scituate recorded the highest snowfall total in Rhode Island, with 22 inches (56 cm). A 64 miles per hour (103 km/h) wind gust occurred in Newport.

In New York, more than 6,000 power outages occurred in Long Island, and 180 flights were cancelled at LaGuardia Airport. A travel advisory was issued by the New York City Emergency Management on March 13. American Airlines also suspended operations and flights in Burlington, Vermont. A location in the higher elevations of Woodford, Vermont received a snowfall total of 50 inches (130 cm) in a three-day period.

Blizzard conditions occurred across portions of Maine, including in Portland, where schools were closed. Over a foot of snow was reported in portions of the state, and American Airlines suspended all flights out of Portland.

=== Canada ===
As the low-pressure area associated with the winter storm moved into eastern portions of the country, more than 5,500 power outages occurred in New Brunswick, and 45 centimetres (18 in) of snow fell in Miramichi, New Brunswick. Several locations across New Brunswick received more than 10 inches (25 cm).
