= 2017–18 North American winter =

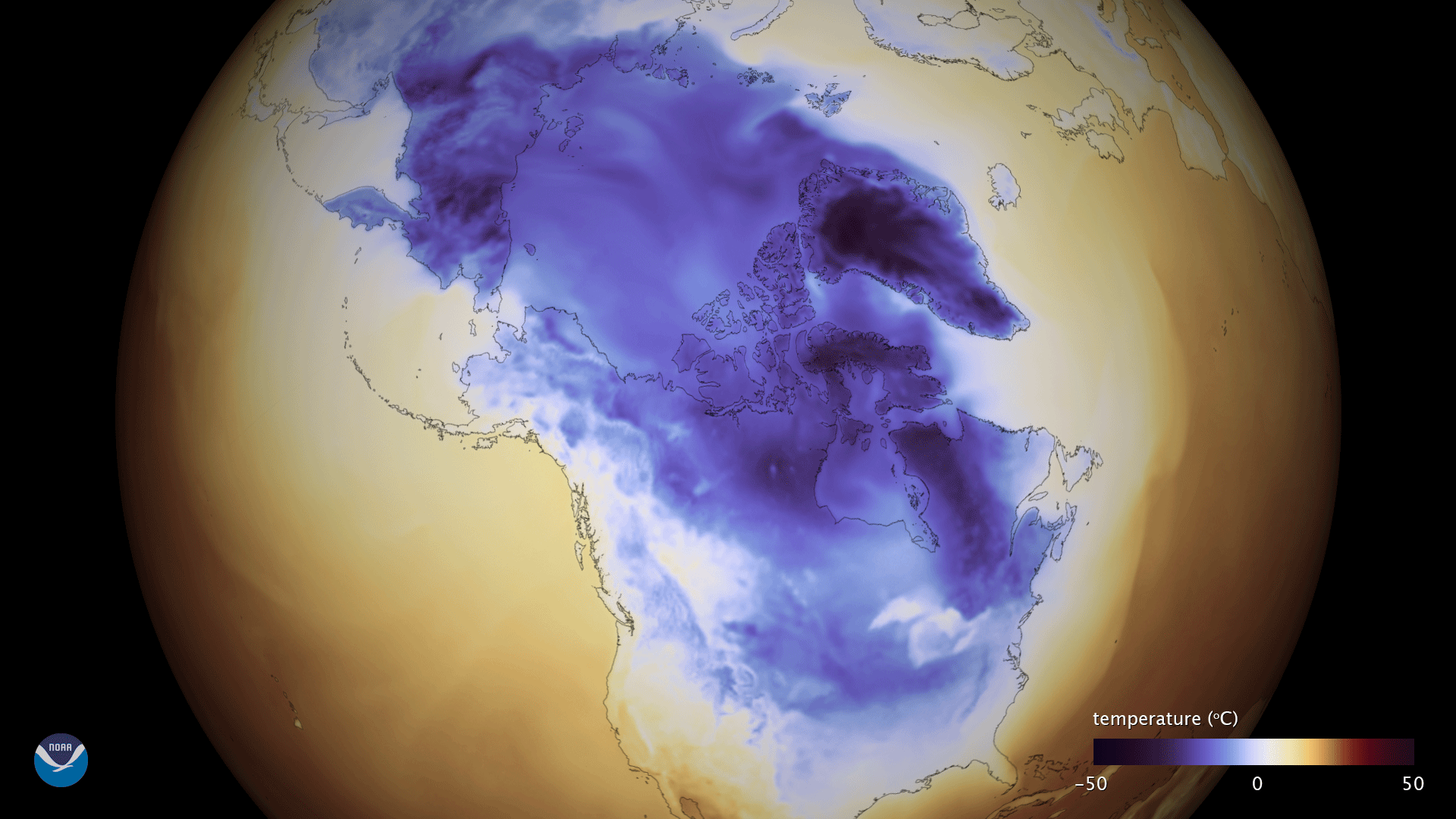
- A temperature map of the frigid conditions in North America on January 1, 2018.

Seasonal boundaries
- Meteorological winter: December 1 – February 28
- Astronomical winter: December 21 – March 19
- First event started: October 29, 2017
- Last event concluded: April 15, 2018

Most notable event
- Name: January 2018 North American blizzard
  - Duration: January 2–5, 2018
  - Lowest pressure: 949 mb (28.02 inHg)
  - Fatalities: 22 fatalities
  - Damage: $1.1 billion (2018 USD)

Seasonal statistics
- Total WPC-issued storms: 20 total
- Rated storms (RSI) (Cat. 1+): 7 total
- Major storms (RSI) (Cat. 3+): 1 total
- Maximum snowfall accumulation: 39.3 in (100 cm) at Cobleskill, New York (March 1–3, 2018)
- Maximum ice accretion: 1 in (25 mm) at Lowville, New York (April 12–15, 2018)
- Total fatalities: At least 98 total
- Total damage: ≥ $5.7 billion (2018 USD)

Related articles
- 2017–18 European windstorm season

The 2017–18 North American winter saw weather patterns across North America that were very active, erratic, and protracted, especially near the end of the season, resulting in widespread snow and cold across the continent during the winter. Significant events included rare snowfall in the South, an outbreak of frigid temperatures that affected the United States during the final week of 2017 and early weeks of January, and a series of strong nor'easters that affected the Northeastern United States during the month of March. In addition, flooding also took place during the month of February in the Central United States. Finally the winter came to a conclusion with a powerful storm system that caused a tornado outbreak and blizzard in mid-April. The most intense event, however, was an extremely powerful cyclonic blizzard that impacted the Northeastern United States in the first week of 2018. Similar to the previous winter, a La Niña was expected to influence the winter weather across North America.

While there is no well-agreed-upon date used to indicate the start of winter in the Northern Hemisphere, there are two definitions of winter which may be used. Based on the astronomical definition, winter began at the winter solstice, which in 2017 occurred on December 21, and ends at the March equinox, which in 2018 occurred on March 20. Based on the meteorological definition, the first day of winter is December 1 and the last day February 28. Each definition involves a period of approximately three months, with some variability with both definitions containing two months and a week. Winter is often defined by meteorologists to be the three calendar months with the lowest average temperatures. Since both definitions span the calendar year, it is possible to have a winter storm in two different years.

== Seasonal forecasts ==
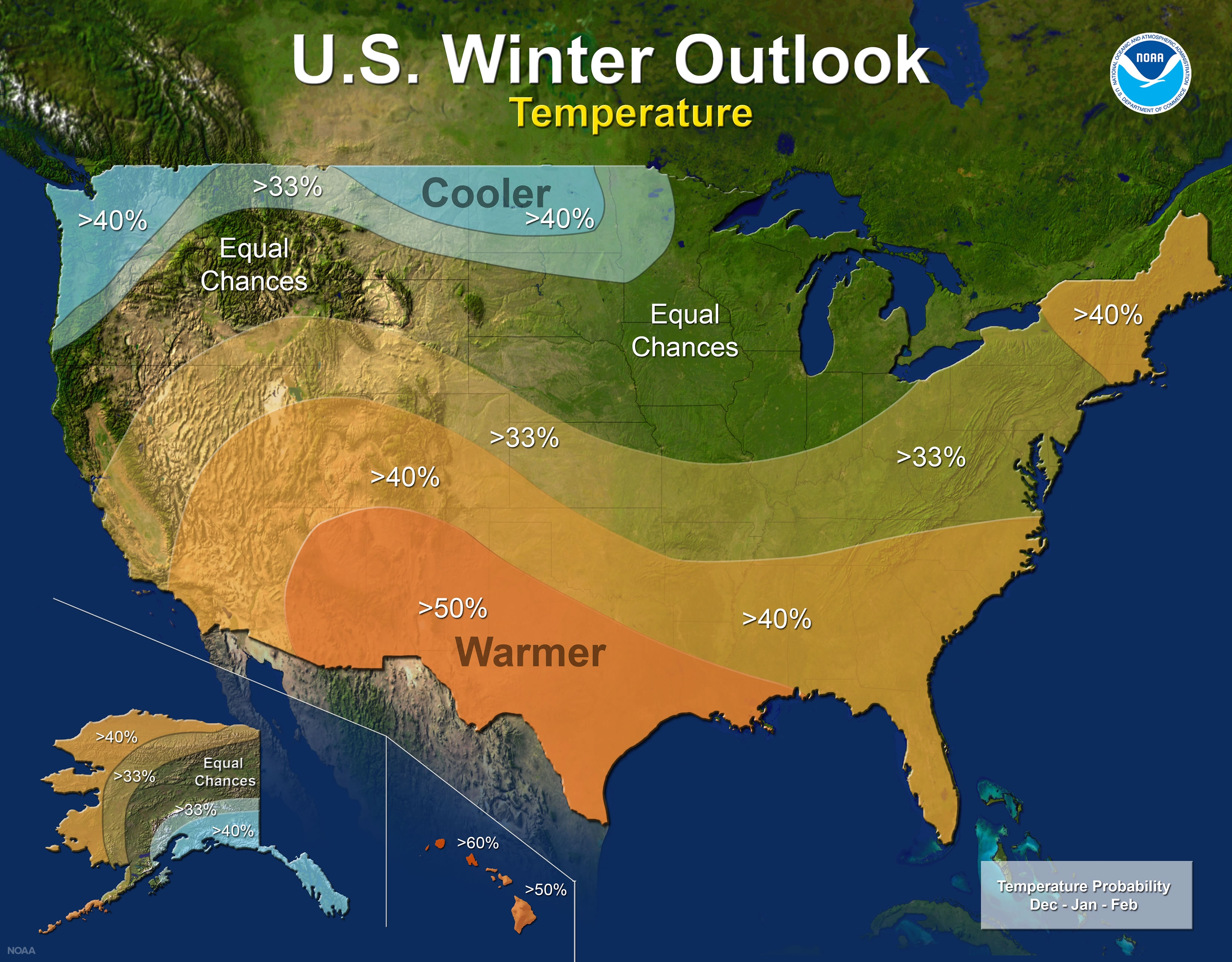
Temperature outlook

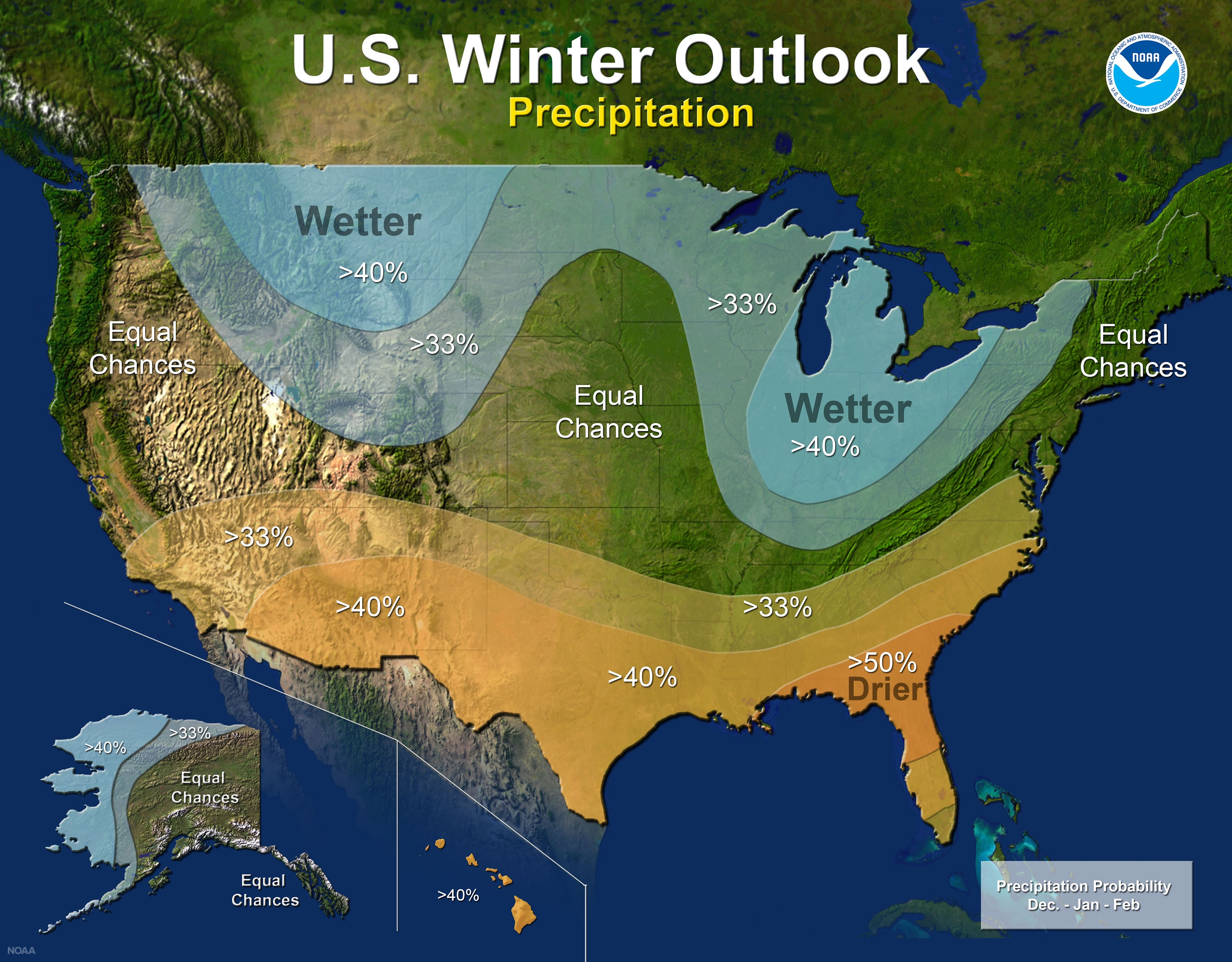
Precipitation outlook (Note: While the graphic portrays below-average precipitation as favored for Hawaii, the outlook text and other NOAA sources indicate that above-average precipitation is favored.)

On October 19, 2017, the National Oceanic and Atmospheric Administration's Climate Prediction Center released its U.S. Winter Outlook. The outlook noted a 55–65% chance that a La Niña would develop. According to CPC Deputy Director Mike Halpert, any such La Niña was expected to be "weak and potentially short-lived", but it could still affect the season. He also noted that La Niña years normally result in colder-than-average, wetter winters in the northern tier of the United States and the inverse conditions across the south. In terms of precipitation, wetter-than-average conditions were favored across the majority of the northern United States, including a region spanning from the northern Rocky Mountains to the eastern Great Lakes in addition to the Ohio Valley, Hawaii, and western and northern Alaska. Drier conditions were anticipated across the entire southern United States.

Above-average temperatures were favored across the southern two-thirds of the contiguous United States and along the east coast, as well as in Hawaii and the northern and western parts of Alaska. The outlook favored below-average temperatures in the northern tier, from Minnesota to the Pacific Northwest region as well as southeastern Alaska.

The remainder of the country was assigned equal chances of either above or below-normal temperatures or precipitation. The drought outlook noted that drought was likely to remain in parts of the northern Plains, with recovery likely to the west. The development of limited regions of drought was possible in regions that did not receive rainfall associated with tropical systems during the 2017 Atlantic hurricane season.

== Seasonal summary ==
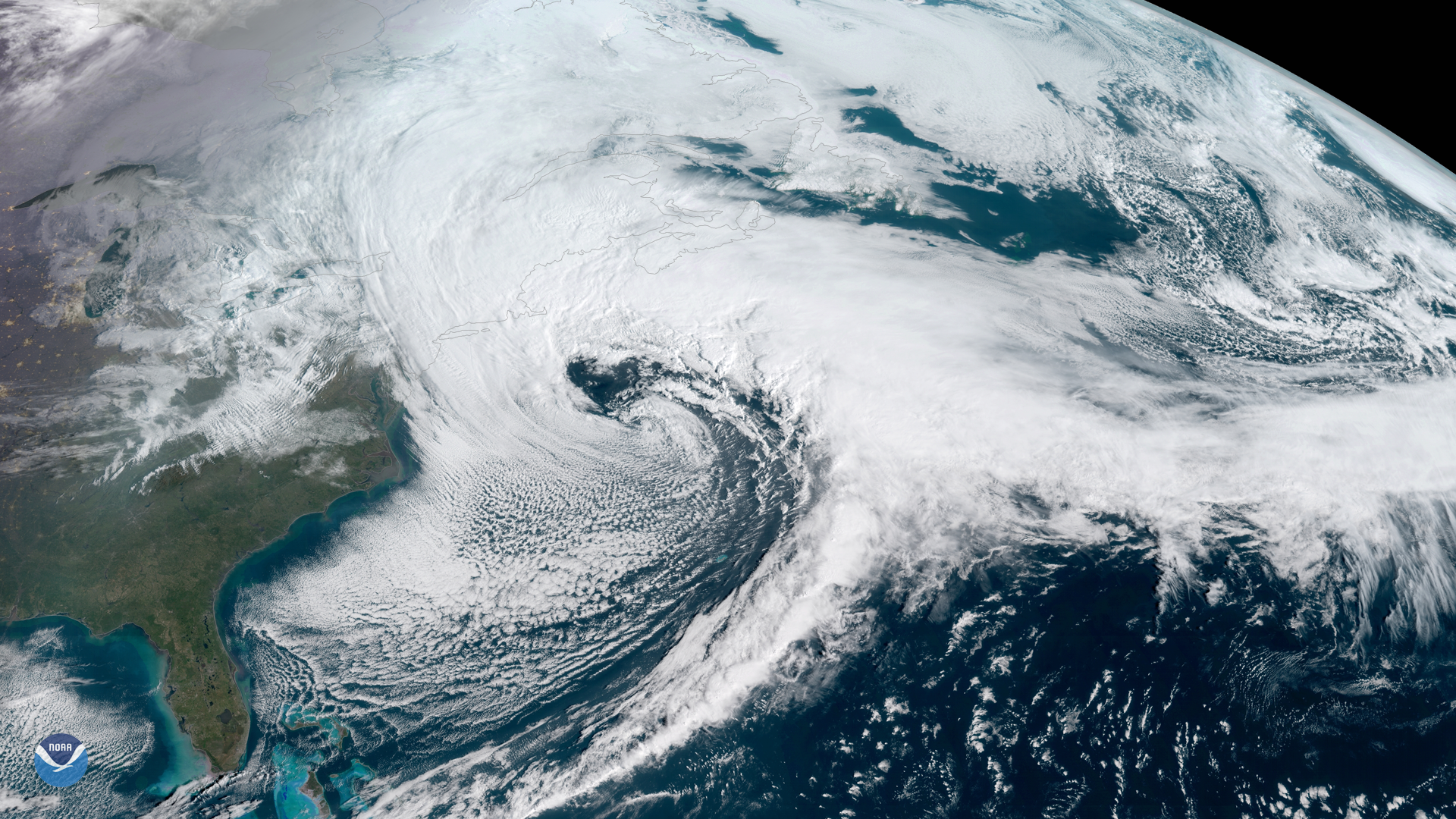
A nor'easter impacts the New England area on March 13

The North American winter of 2017–18 began in the month of November with the highest snow extent in at least one and a half decades, with snow covering over a quarter of the contiguous United States, 22% more than the same date in 2011, the next-most-recent year with comparable snow coverage at that date. However, this trend did not last through all of the month, with the last week having the least snowfall of that time of year for the same time period. This extensive snowpack was due in part to cold temperatures on an extent not seen since at least 2014 in the early part of the month caused by an Arctic front advancing southward into the northern United States, breaking several record low temperatures in major cities from the Upper Midwest to the Mid-Atlantic. In Minnesota, at least several places recorded temperatures below 0 °F (−18 °C) on November 10, breaking several record lows – some places reached as low as −10 °F (−23 °C). In early December, following another outbreak of cold temperatures, a major winter storm impacted the far southern reaches of the United States – areas as far as the southern portions of the Gulf Coast up to the Mid-Atlantic states and New England received a wide swath of accumulating snowfall, significantly hampering travel and knocking power out to tens of thousands. The rest of the month was generally warmer than average nationwide, primarily in the southwestern United States, and ranked as the third-warmest in historical records. However, towards the end of the month, an outbreak of below-average temperatures impacted much of the continental United States over the holiday, with New York City recording its second-coldest New Year's Eve on record with a temperature of 9 °F (−13 °C).

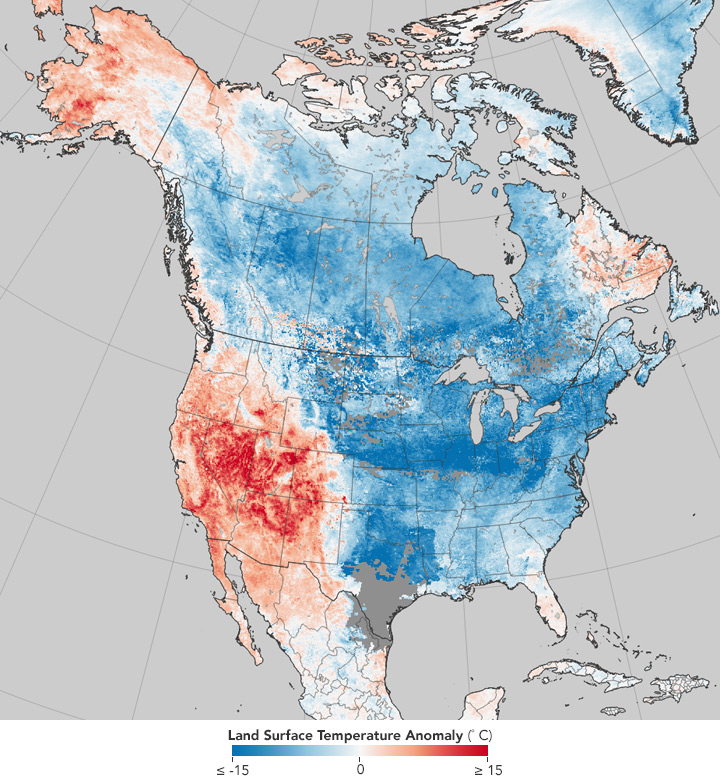
Temperature anomalies showing below average temperatures across much of North America in late December 2017 to early January 2018.

January and the new year opened with cold temperatures remaining in place across the eastern part of the country, which would continue until the middle of the month. In the first week of 2018, an extremely powerful cyclonic blizzard developed off the Southeastern United States, explosively deepening as it traveled parallel to the East Coast. The blizzard delivered snow as far south as Florida which rarely sees snowfall at all, and left a wide swath of snowfall totals up to 1–2 feet (12–24 in) in the Mid-Atlantic and New England. In addition, major coastal flooding occurred with the system as well and killed at least 11 people. The following week around January 12–13, a major winter storm affected much of the Appalachian Mountains and interior New England, and a few days later on January 16, a separate system dumped as much as 12 inches (30 cm) in areas of North Carolina, and for the second time in a month brought snowfall to areas of the Florida Panhandle. Another winter storm brought blizzard-like conditions and up to a foot of snow in the Upper Midwest the following week, with the Twin Cities in Minnesota receiving their largest one-day snowfall since December 2010 with 12.4 inches (31 cm) falling on January 22. The long-term pattern that brought below-average temperatures to the eastern half of the United States largely abated by the latter part of January, but not before causing drought conditions to expand within the West to its largest coverage since May 2014, due to above-average temperatures across much of the region. The end of January saw some scattered snow-related events, but a pattern change in February brought warmer conditions to most of the U.S., and thus few wintry weather events – except for one that struck the Northeast in mid-February. Unprecedented warmth days later sent temperatures as high as 80 °F (27 °C) on February 21 in the eastern half of the country.

By the turn of March, however, a major pattern shift occurred in which the same regions in the Northeast were hit by four consecutive rounds of nor'easters and heavy snow within a three-week period. This led places such as New York City and New Jersey to have a March that was cooler then the previous February. The first one developed on March 1, and although the most severe damage was caused by flooding as well as snow, unusually high tides and storm surges along the coast, wind and downed trees caused massive inland power outages, Days later, a second nor'easter developed and rapidly strengthened while bringing heavy snowfall to New Jersey and interior New York. The storm caused up to 1 million people to lose power. Hundreds of flights were cancelled across the region, and many schools closed due to the nor'easter. Several municipalities in the Philadelphia area declared snow emergencies and many schools and government offices were closed on March 7. Nearly a week later, a third nor'easter affected the New England coast with near-blizzard conditions and coastal flooding on March 13. Wind gusts of 47 mph (76 km/h) were reported at Logan International Airport in Boston while gusts reached 77 mph (124 km/h) on Nantucket Island, 79 mph (127 km/h) in Hyannis, and 81 mph (130 km/h) in East Falmouth. A storm surge of 3 feet (0.91 m) was reported on Nantucket while a 2.8 feet (0.85 m) storm surge was recorded in Boston. Over a foot of snow was reported in portions of New Hampshire, with Deefield receiving almost 29 inches and Middleton reported 28 inches. No widespread power outages were reported. The storm brought heavy snow and blizzard conditions to Maine on March 13. Blizzard conditions were reported in Portland. Over a foot of snow was reported in portions of the state. The fourth and final nor'easter occurred on March 20 to 22, with its focus further south in the Mid-Atlantic. Some areas saw their heaviest late-season snowfall on record, and approximately 100,000 lost power as a result of the storm. The pattern largely abated by late March, but soon made a comeback as many regions in the northern half had one of the coldest Aprils on record, and the snowpack in the U.S. was well-above average for the month of April. Part of this was due to a rare, late-season and powerful blizzard that struck the High Plains with nearly 2–3 feet (24–36 in) of snowfall. Wintry weather soon came to an end in the country for the season after the storm had passed.

== Events ==
=== Late October nor'easter ===
- Category 0 "Nuisance" (RSI/NOAA: N/A)
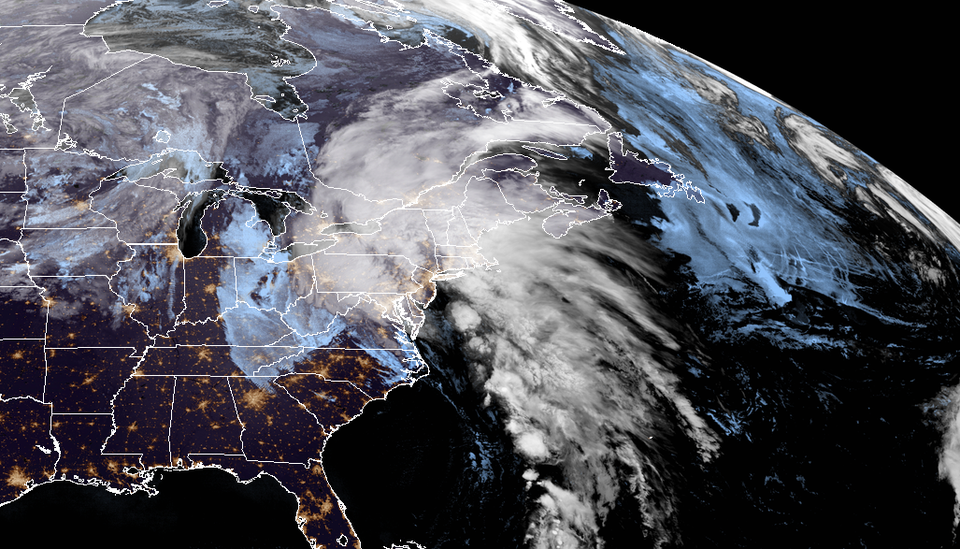
- Duration: October 29 – October 30, 2017
- Lowest pressure: 975 mb (28.79 inHg)
- Maximum snow: 8.5 in (22 cm)
- Damage: ≥ $100 million (2017 USD)

Near the end of October, just before Halloween, a powerful extratropical cyclone formed in the Atlantic Ocean off of the coast of New England. Rapidly intensifying into a powerful nor'easter, the winter storm was enhanced by moisture left over from Tropical Storm Philippe – which dissipated over Cuba and spawned an unrelated non-tropical low that the nor'easter later absorbed – before hitting New England and eastern Canada.

The nor'easter resulted in approximately 1.2 million power outages in New England. The system produced tropical storm-force sustained winds, reaching 57 mph (92 km/h) in Warwick, Rhode Island, and hurricane-force wind gusts, peaking at 93 mph (150 km/h) in Popponesset, Massachusetts. The system also produced snowfall mainly in the higher elevations, in areas such as West Virginia and some parts of western Maryland. Snowfall totals reached up to over 8 inches (20 cm) in some spots, causing accidents and requiring snow plowers to be deployed in Preston County.

In Canada, Hydro-Québec reported 200,000 customers losing power because of damages due to winds of 70 to 90 kilometres per hour (43 to 56 mph). It also rained heavily in Quebec and Eastern Ontario, with up to 98 millimetres (3.9 in) in the Canadian capital region of Ottawa forcing Prime Minister Justin Trudeau to use an all-terrain vehicle to leave from his second home on Mousseau Lake in Gatineau Park to go to Parliament.

=== Mid-November cold wave ===
After an exceptionally warm September and October for many places in the Midwestern and Northeastern United States, a strong Arctic air mass entered the Midwest on November 9, resulting in some of the coldest temperatures ever recorded this early in the season. On November 9, Winnipeg saw a record cold low of −23.7 °C (−10.7 °F) and record cold high of −11.4 °C (11.5 °F). Lake-effect snow fell in places like the Upper Peninsula of Michigan, where the Mackinac Bridge had to be closed due to low visibility. Chicago on November 10 also reported Lake-effect snow. The timeframe of November 10–11 broke record lows from northern Minnesota to the New York City tri-state area. On November 10, record lows were recorded in the Midwest. Among these November 10 records were five locations in the Upper Midwest that plunged below zero. In addition to the International Falls, Minnesota (−14 °F (−26 °C)), the coldest, and even earliest, record lows mentioned above were set in Hibbing, Minnesota −12 °F (−24 °C), Duluth, Minnesota and Pellston, Michigan −5 °F (−21 °C), and Merrill, Wisconsin −1 °F (−18 °C). The Arctic intrusion on November 10 came as a shock to people that had yet to see temperatures cold enough for frost, especially in New England. Before then, not only it was one of the warmest Fall seasons to that date, places like Philadelphia and Washington D.C. had yet to see a day/night that was below 40 °F (4 °C) since the previous Spring earlier that year. The low temperature in Philadelphia early in the morning of November 11 was 23 °F (−5 °C). This came 2°F (1°C) within reaching the record set for that day in 1961. Washington D.C. tied their record of 26 °F (−3 °C) that same morning set back in 1973. Boston saw two nights of record lows, as November 10 had a record low of 24 °F (−4 °C) and November 11 had a record low of 23 °F (−5 °C). New York City also set record lows of 25 °F (−4 °C) on November 10 and 24 °F (−4 °C) on November 11, and the high on November 11 was below what the typical low temperature is, at 38 °F (3 °C). In New Jersey, Trenton and Atlantic City set record lows, both at 21 °F (−6 °C). Wilmington, Delaware also set a record low that day, at 20 °F (−7 °C). Many cities in the Great Lakes and Northeast set record lows that morning, which record lows were recorded as far south as Charlotte, North Carolina. Forecasters even called for an earlier start to winter ahead of this cold wave, and a colder winter then the last 2 years.

=== Early December winter storm ===
- Category 2 "Significant" (RSI/NOAA: 3.077)
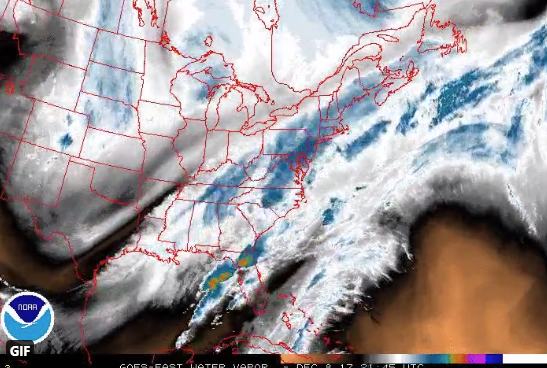
- Duration: December 7 – December 10, 2017
- Lowest pressure: 995 mb (29.38 inHg)
- Maximum snow: 25 in (64 cm)
- Fatalities: 7 (Note: While there were 8 fatalities in association with this storm, one of them was located in Europe and is not included in this count) fatalities

A strong winter storm affected areas from northeastern Mexico to the Northeastern United States in early December. The origins of the storm were complex, with the initial disturbance forming over the extreme southern United States as a stationary front left behind from a departing extratropical cyclone on December 7. At the same time, a cold air mass was establishing itself into the Deep South. A large plume of moisture encompassed the entire Gulf Coast, and snow broke out early on December 8 in places that rarely even see snow, including Mexico, southeastern Texas and Louisiana – even in the Florida Panhandle. The storm dropped up to 25 inches (64 cm) of snow in some parts of the Southeast as it slowly moved eastwards, breaking several snowfall records; meanwhile, a gulf low formed in the Gulf of Mexico the same day – this would ultimately become the dominant low of the system. Transitioning into a nor'easter off the East Coast of the United States, the system began moving parallel to the shoreline, with a large swath of snowfall accompanying it. The low slowly deepened throughout the day of December 9, bringing the first snow of the season to many parts of the Northeast and New England.

Up to 400,000 people were left without power across the affected regions, several schools and roads shut down, and 3 were have confirmed to have been killed by the storm as of December 9. One person died in Georgia, and two in Virginia. The storm dumped over 6 inches (15 cm) of snow across 17 states. The highest amount, 25.5 inches (65 cm), was in Mount Mitchell, North Carolina. The storm brought the earliest measurable snow in the history of Mobile, Alabama. Alabama had numerous car crashes along Interstate 65. Atlanta International Airport saw over 1,000 cancellations due to the storm. Snow fell as south as the Florida Panhandle and Brownsville, Texas, the latter was recently just shy of 90 °F (32 °C) three days earlier. Lafayette, Louisiana recorded their snowiest December day on record, with 1.7 inches (4.3 cm) of snow. Despite heavy snow falling at Orchard Park, New York, where the Buffalo Bills play, with 8–9 in (20–23 cm) of snow falling during the game, the game was not cancelled.

=== Post-Christmas–mid-January cold wave ===
In late December, a strong Arctic air mass, due to the weakening of the Northern Polar vortex, came and established from Canada into the Midwestern and Northeastern United States with the core of the cold centered in the Upper Midwest, Interior Northeast, and Eastern Canada. Temperatures were 10 to 20 °F (6 to 11 °C) below average for that time of year. International Falls, Minnesota recorded a record low temperature on December 27 of −32 °F (−36 °C). In Indianapolis, Indiana, the temperature reached a new low of −12 °F (−24 °C). In 2017, Watertown, New York and Buffalo, New York each had it coldest final week on record for the year.

In St. Louis, Missouri temperatures dropped to −6 °F (−21 °C) on New Year's Day. On January 2, a daily record low in Sioux City, Iowa was set at −28 °F (−33 °C). Other daily record low temperatures included Cedar Rapids, Iowa −23 °F (−31 °C), Pierre, South Dakota −21 °F (−29 °C), South Bend, Indiana −15 °F (−26 °C), Quincy, Illinois −12 °F (−24 °C) and Lynchburg, Virginia 3 °F (−16 °C).

In their first few days of 2018, the cold front was stretched as far south into the Caribbean. However, temperatures were much warmer - Havana didn't see any temperatures below 14 °C (57 °F).

=== Early January blizzard ===
- Category 1 "Notable" (RSI/NOAA: 2.55)
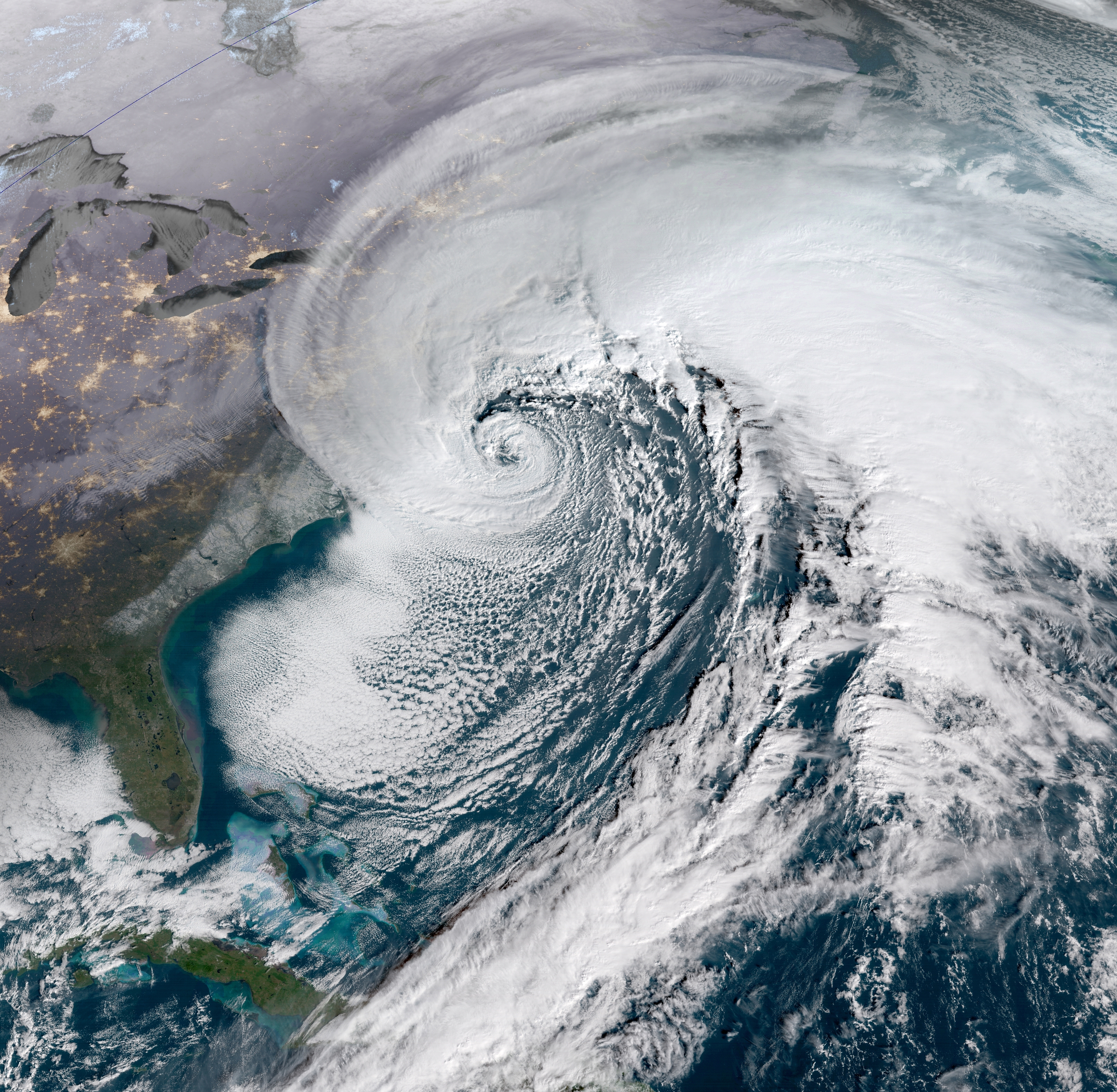
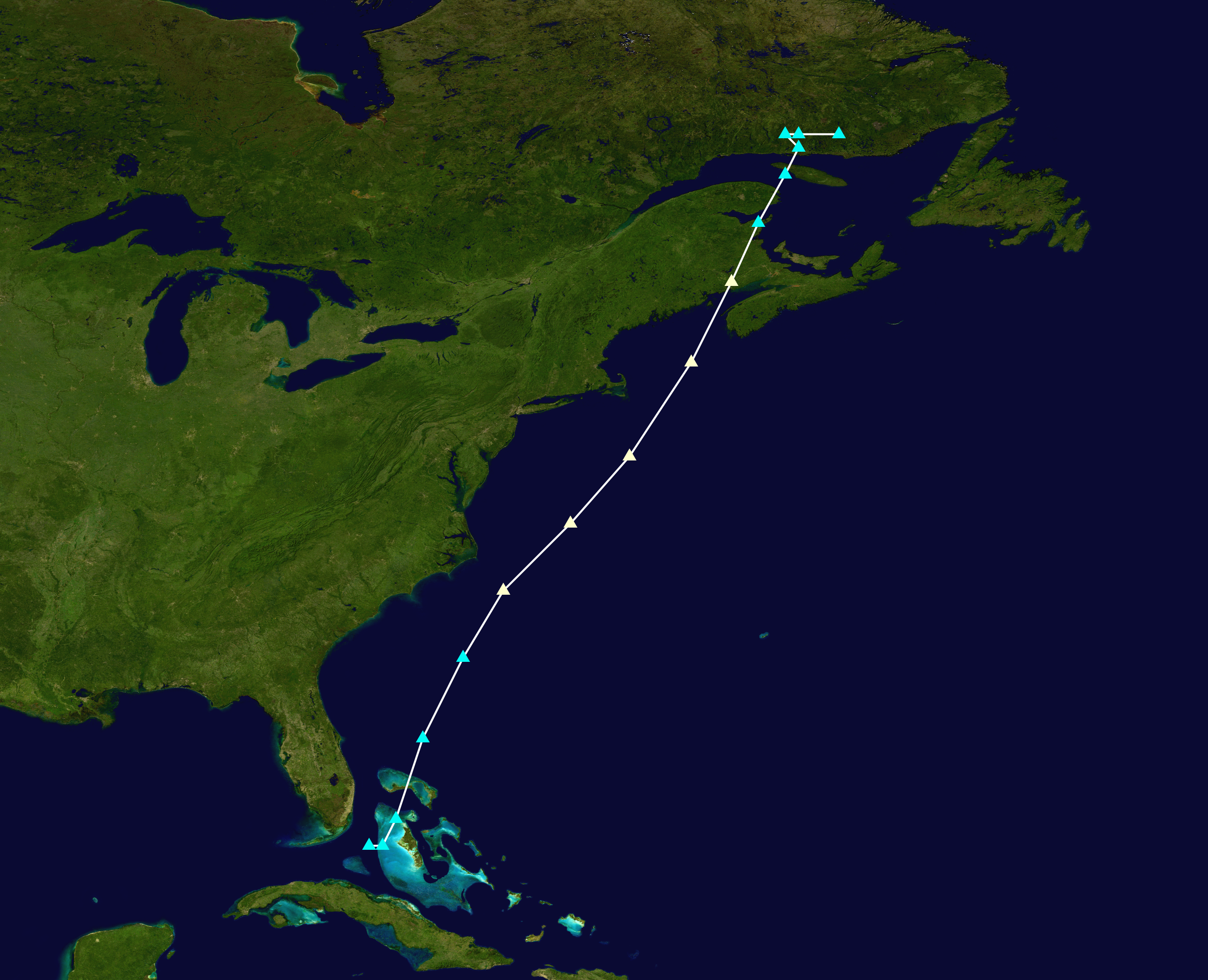
- Duration: January 2 – January 5, 2018
- Lowest pressure: 949 mb (28.02 inHg)
- Maximum snow: 24 in (61 cm)
- Fatalities: 22 fatalities
- Damage: $1.1 billion (2018 USD)

A severe blizzard caused disruption along the Eastern United States in the first few days of the new year. It provided snow in municipalities that do not often receive and therefore are not accustomed to handling winter precipitation, such as Georgia and Florida, and accumulated over 2 feet (61 cm) of snow in New England, the Mid-Atlantic states, and Eastern Canada. The storm started on January 3, 2018, moving rapidly to the northeast, after which time the system moved east, causing great snowfall. The storm was also dubbed as a "historic bomb cyclone".

The blizzard produced snowfall and other forms of frozen precipitation across much of the United States Eastern Seaboard. As of the WPC's fifth winter storm summary, the highest official snowfall amount recorded is 17.0 in (43 cm) in Cape May Court House, New Jersey; however, a snowfall total of 52 centimetres (20 in) was reported in Bathurst, New Brunswick. Freezing rain totals peaked at 0.5 in (1.3 cm) in Brunswick, Georgia and near Folkston, Georgia. At least twenty-two fatalities were attributed to the storm, including at least eight car accident-related deaths. At least 4,020 flights were cancelled across the United States, with a majority of cancellations caused by the extensive winter storm. Insurers estimate that claims relating to coastal flooding from the storm will be more than those from snow-related damage.

=== Early January West Coast cyclone & floods ===
A strong low-pressure system and cold front developed off the coast of California on January 5, 2018. The system moved onto the mainland on January 8, bringing heavy rain to Southern California and prompting mandatory evacuations in parts of Los Angeles, Santa Barbara, and Ventura counties, over potential mudslides in areas affected by wildfires. The storm intensified on the following day, with at least four inches (100 mm) of rain falling over the two-day period, before ending on January 9, causing several major mudflows.

A series of mudflows occurred in Southern California in early January 2018, particularly affecting areas northwest of Montecito in Santa Barbara County. The incident was responsible for 23 deaths, although the body of one of the victims has never been found. Approximately 163 people were hospitalized with various injuries, including four in critical condition. The disaster occurred one month after a series of major wildfires. The conflagrations devastated steep slopes, which caused loss of vegetation and destabilization of the soil and greatly facilitated subsequent mudflows. The mudflows caused at least $177 million (2018 USD) in property damage, and cost at least $7 million in emergency responses and another $43 million (2018 USD) to clean up.

=== January winter storms ===
==== First storm (January 12–13) ====
A large winter storm complex spread a swath of snow and ice across the northern parts of the Ohio Valley and New England, as a strong cold front pushed through the regions with a developing low. Several locations received up to a quarter inch of ice while others observed over 1 foot (12 in) of snow.

==== Second storm (January 16–18) ====
A widespread winter storm impacted a large portion Southern, Midwestern, and Northeastern United States and brought snow to places that rarely see it. This storm hit Texas and the Midwest on January 16, 2018. Then, the storm impacted New England and Mid-Atlantic states on January 17. Up to 2 inches (5.1 cm) fell in Shreveport, Louisiana, marking the first time more than an inch of snow fell in Shreveport since 2015. Snow around Shreveport resulted in Interstate 49 shutting down in the area. Austin, Houston, and San Antonio, Texas saw many vehicle accidents because of sleet and freezing rain on the morning of January 16. This led to an overwhelming number of vehicular accidents, such as several accidents in the Dallas-Fort Worth metroplex near Canton. In Galveston, hundreds of pipes froze and burst, depleting the city's water reserves to drought levels and forcing Galveston County and Chambers County to implement mandatory water conservation measures until the pipes could be fixed. Florida observed snow for the third time during the winter, with snow and freezing rain observed in portions of the Florida Panhandle. Snow fell in Crestview and DeFuniak Springs while freezing rain fell in Fort Walton Beach. Pensacola saw sleet which accumulated on grass and vehicles. The Bob Sikes Bridge to Pensacola Beach was closed due to ice. In North Carolina on January 17, Winston-Salem received 6 inches (15 cm) of snow, Greensboro had 6 inches (15 cm) to 8 inches (20 cm), Burlington had 8 inches (20 cm) to 9 inches (23 cm), and part of Durham had 9.5 inches (24 cm), while areas to the north of Durham had 10 inches (25 cm) to 12 inches (30 cm). Snow fell on portions of the East Coast and Northeast. East Machias, Maine got 11 inches (28 cm), Stockbridge, Massachusetts got 11 inches (28 cm), Rosendale, New York got 10 inches (25 cm), Loyseville, Pennsylvania got 9.5 inches (24 cm), Dover, New Hampshire got 8 inches (20 cm), Canaan, Connecticut got 7 inches (18 cm), and Wantage, New Jersey got 6.4 inches (16 cm). Ten people were killed due to the storm, and numerous roads were shut down as well.

=== Mid-February Mid-Atlantic winter storm ===
- Category 0 "Nuisance" (RSI/NOAA: N/A)
- Duration: February 17 – February 18, 2018
- Lowest pressure: 1007 mb (29.74 inHg)
- Maximum snow: 10 in (25 cm)
- Fatalities: 1 fatalities

On February 17–18, a quick-moving winter storm swept through the Mid-Atlantic states, bringing a swath of 6–10 inches (15–25 cm) across the area, which some hadn't seen since early January due to warmer-than-average temperatures. The system intensified once offshore, but its impacts caused widespread disruption and slippery roads across metro areas in the overnight hours. Ice accumulations also occurred and served to sag some trees in Virginia. A person died due to a fatal crash on Interstate 99.

=== Late February ice storm ===
For several days in late February, a large surge of moisture resulted in a significant ice storm affecting much of the Central United States. On February 23, icy conditions caused a plane to skid off a runway in Green Bay, Wisconsin. Hundreds of thousands were without power in Texas, and Oklahoma schools postponed all basketball games as well. Total ice accumulations ranged from 0.25–0.5 inches (6.4–12.7 mm), resulting in travel delays and accidents across much of the affected areas.

=== March nor'easters ===
After a period of record warmth in late February, weather patterns across the continent abruptly became much more active in March. Four powerful nor'easters affected the United States and eastern Canada in that month alone, each dropping more than a foot of snow in the areas affected. Much of the Delaware Water Gap National Recreation Area closed due to the nor'easters.

==== March 1–3 nor'easter ====
- Category 1 "Notable" (RSI/NOAA: 2.185)
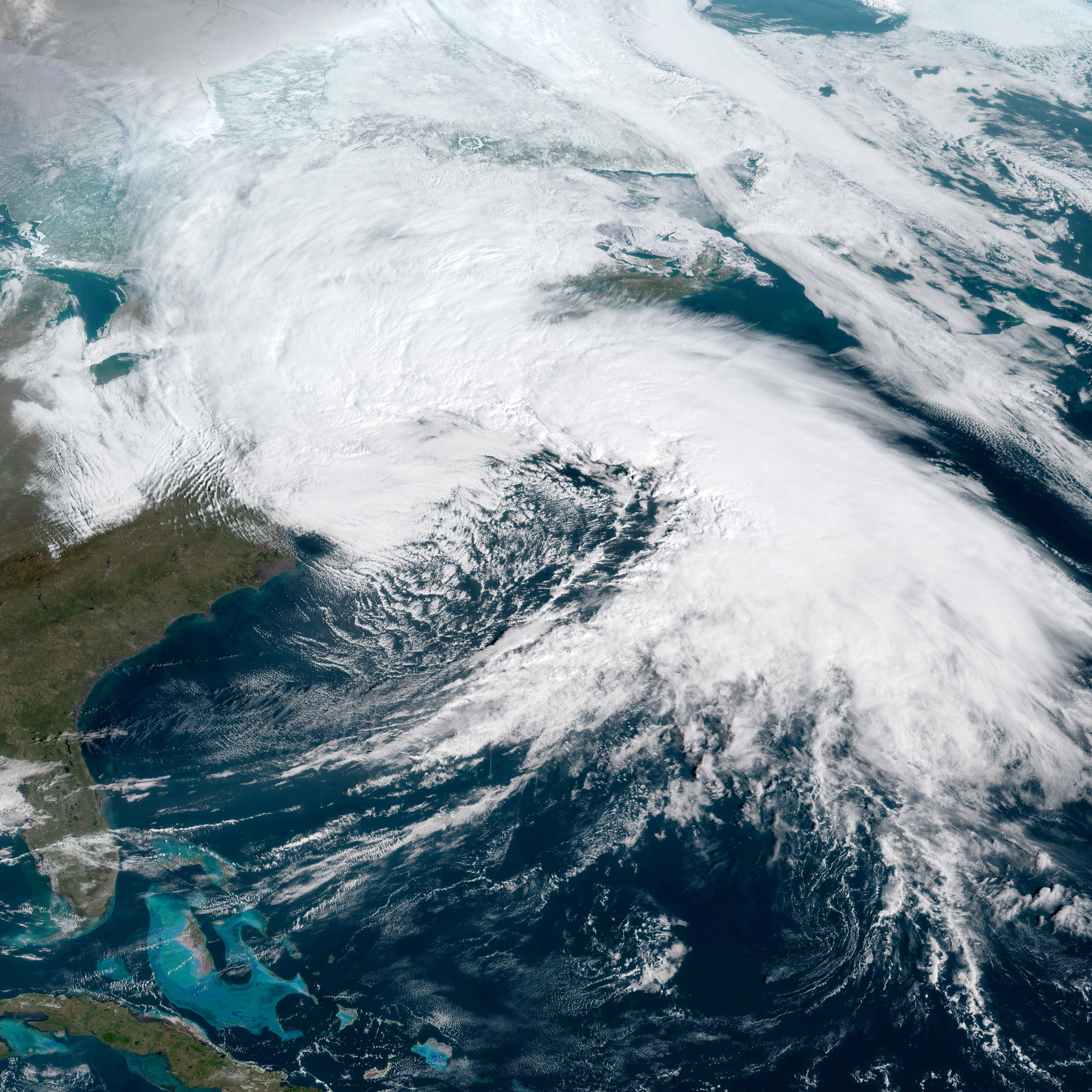
- Duration: March 1 – March 3, 2018
- Lowest pressure: 974 mb (28.76 inHg)
- Maximum snow: 39.3 in (100 cm)
- Fatalities: 9 fatalities
- Damage: $2.25 billion (2018 USD)

The first nor'easter began to take shape over the Mid-Atlantic states at the transition of February and March. As an area of low pressure moved into the interior Northeast late on March 1, snowfall fell in areas close to the Canada–United States border, while precipitation in coastal areas was rain due to slightly warmer air. Overnight into the early morning hours of March 2, a new area of low pressure formed and rapidly strengthened off the coast of New Jersey, while snow began to slowly increase in coverage near Pennsylvania and southern New York. Wet bulbing helped bring snow to areas closer on the coast, such as New York City.

Although the most severe damage was caused by flooding as well as snow, unusually high tides and storm surges along the coast, wind and downed trees caused massive inland power outages, with the number of outages as high as 1.6 million at one point. As of March 2, at least 9 people are known to have been killed as a result of the storm, five from falling trees or branches.

==== March 6–8 nor'easter ====
- Category 1 "Notable" (RSI/NOAA: 2.475)
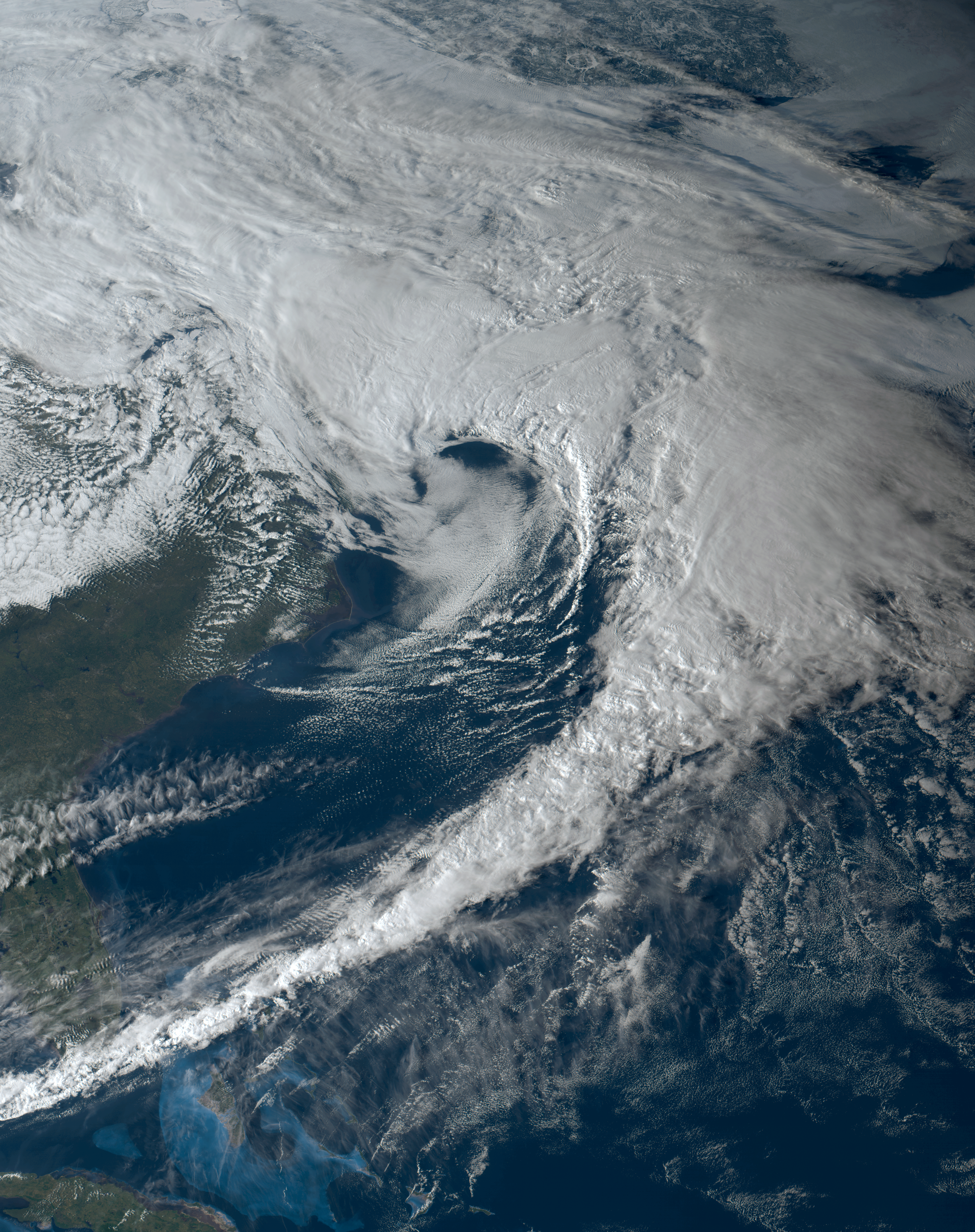
- Duration: March 6 – March 8, 2018
- Lowest pressure: 986 mb (29.12 inHg)
- Maximum snow: 36 in (91 cm)
- Fatalities: 2 fatalities
- Damage: $525 million (2018 USD)

As the first nor'easter occurred, a smaller, but significant blizzard struck the Sierra Nevada mountains and then tracked across the continent as a large weather front, dropping snow across the Midwestern United States and interior Canada. As it reached the Great Lakes on March 6, another low pressure area formed off the Outer Banks of North Carolina. By mid-afternoon the next day, the two systems had merged into a second nor'easter, which rapidly intensified off the New Jersey coastline and dropped up to over 3 feet (36 in) or more of wet snow across much of the Northeast, which hampered the recovery efforts from the first nor'easter. The storm caused up to 1 million people to lose power, and at least 1 person has been confirmed dead due to the storm as of March 7.

Hundreds of flights were cancelled across the region, and many schools closed due to the nor'easter, although some opted to remain open. Many freeways were also closed in the regions, and several states were put under state of emergencies. In Pennsylvania, Governor Tom Wolf declared a state of emergency for several counties in the eastern part of the state. A snow emergency went into effect for the city of Philadelphia on the morning of March 7. Several municipalities in the Philadelphia area declared snow emergencies and many schools and government offices were closed on March 7. Many attractions in the Philadelphia area either closed early or were closed for the entire day on March 7. The nor'easter had moved off by the morning of March 9, but its remnants stalled over Maritime Canada and persisted throughout the weekend.

==== March 12–15 nor'easter ====
- Category 2 "Significant" (RSI/NOAA: 4.335)
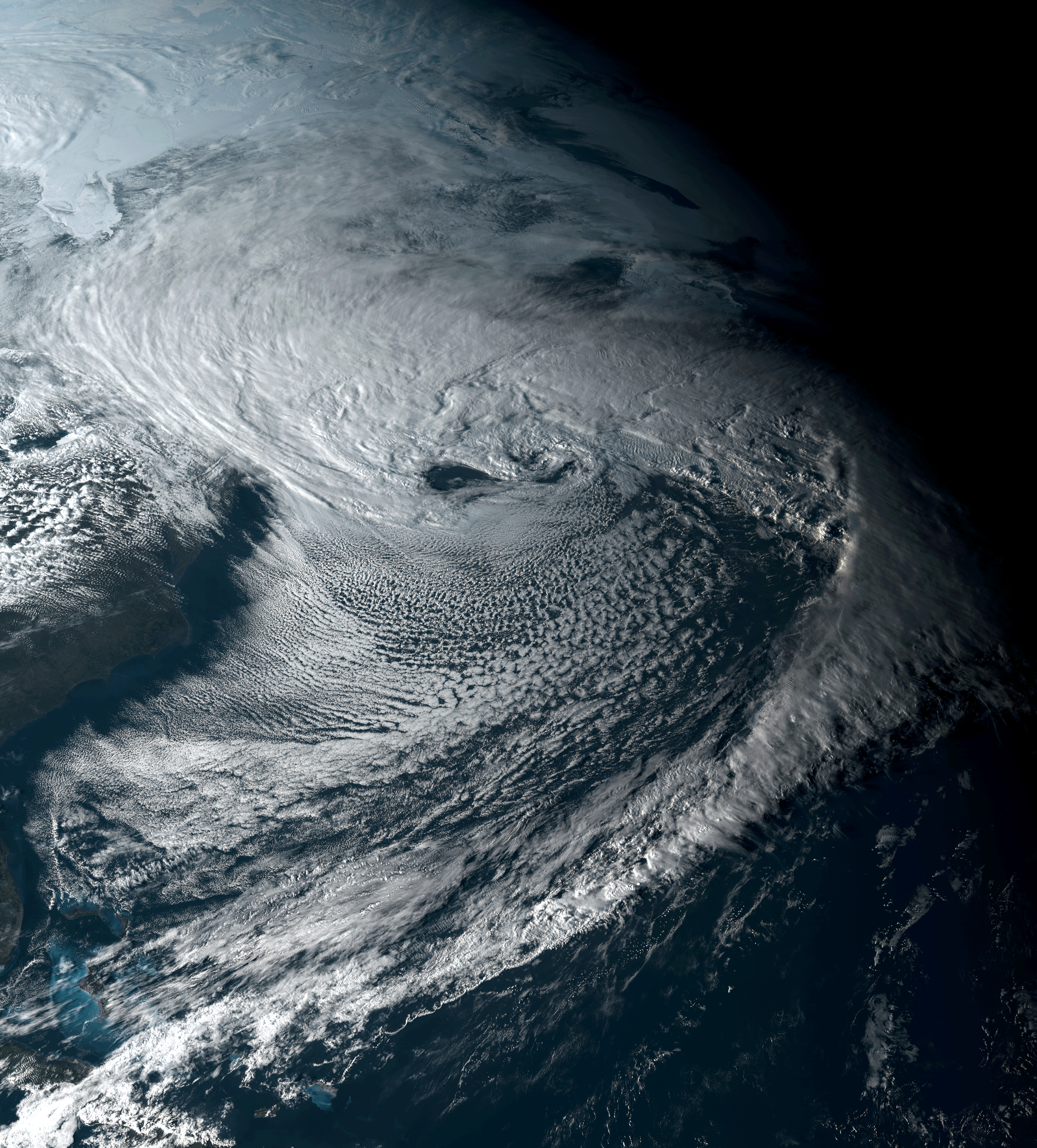
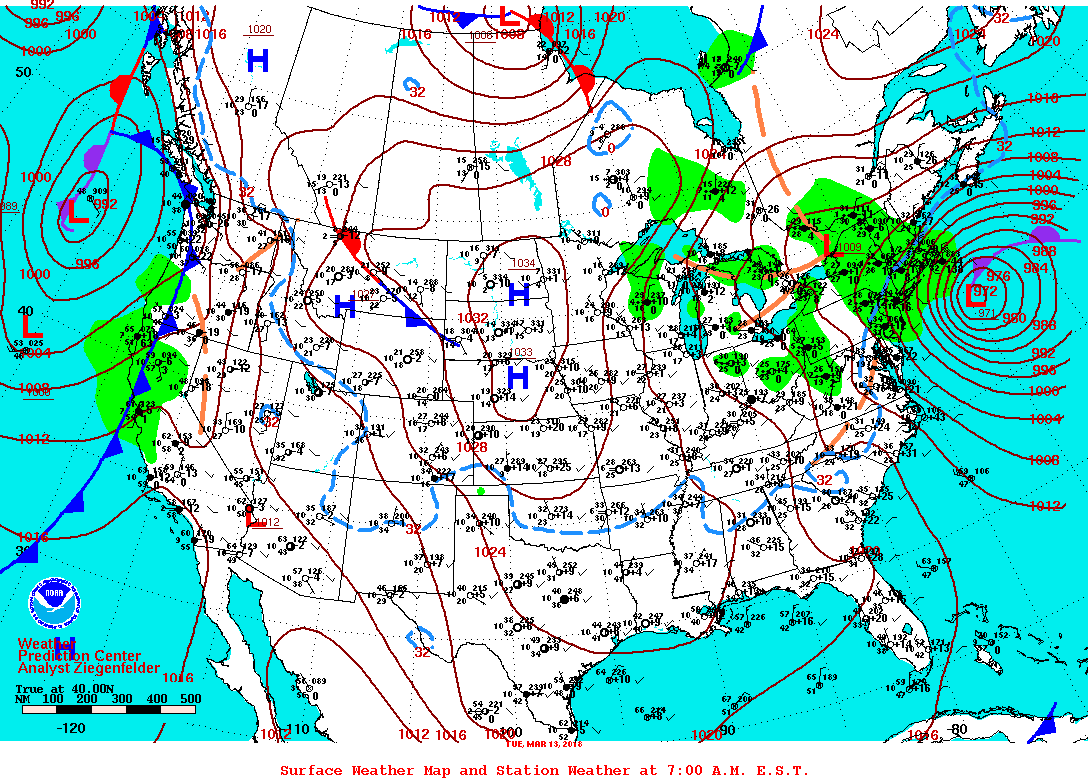
- Duration: March 12 – March 15, 2018
- Lowest pressure: 966 mb (28.53 inHg)
- Maximum snow: 30 in (76 cm)
- Fatalities: 1 fatalities
- Damage: $669,000 (2018 USD)

On the night of March 11, several areas of low pressure developed over the American Southeast and merged into a third nor'easter within 24 hours. On March 13, the storm produced blizzard conditions and a swath of 1–3 feet of snow in New England as it moved northeast into the Gulf of Maine. The storm brought heavy snow blizzard conditions to Rhode Island on March 13. Blizzard conditions were reported in Newport. Most of the state received at least one foot of snow, peaking at 25.1 inches (64 cm) in Foster. The storm brought the heaviest March snow on record in Boston and Worcester. The storm brought heavy snow and blizzard conditions to Massachusetts on March 13. Blizzard conditions were reported in several locations including Boston, Hyannis, Falmouth, Plymouth, Marshfield, and Martha's Vineyard. Over two feet of snow were reported in portions of the state, peaking at 28.3 inches (72 cm) in Methuen.

Wind gusts of 47 mph (76 km/h) were reported at Logan International Airport in Boston while gusts reached 77 mph (124 km/h) on Nantucket Island, 79 mph (127 km/h) in Hyannis, and 81 mph (130 km/h) in East Falmouth. A storm surge of 3 feet (0.91 m) was reported on Nantucket while a 2.8 feet (0.85 m) storm surge was recorded in Boston. Over a foot of snow was reported in portions of New Hampshire, with Deefield receiving almost 29 inches (74 cm) and Middleton reported 28 inches (71 cm). No widespread power outages were reported. The storm brought heavy snow and blizzard conditions to Maine on March 13. Blizzard conditions were reported in Portland. Over a foot of snow was reported in portions of the state. Of the four nor'easters, the third storm was the strongest in terms of minimum pressure, at 966 millibars (28.5 inHg).

==== March 20–22 nor'easter ====
- Category 1 "Notable" (RSI/NOAA: 1.6)
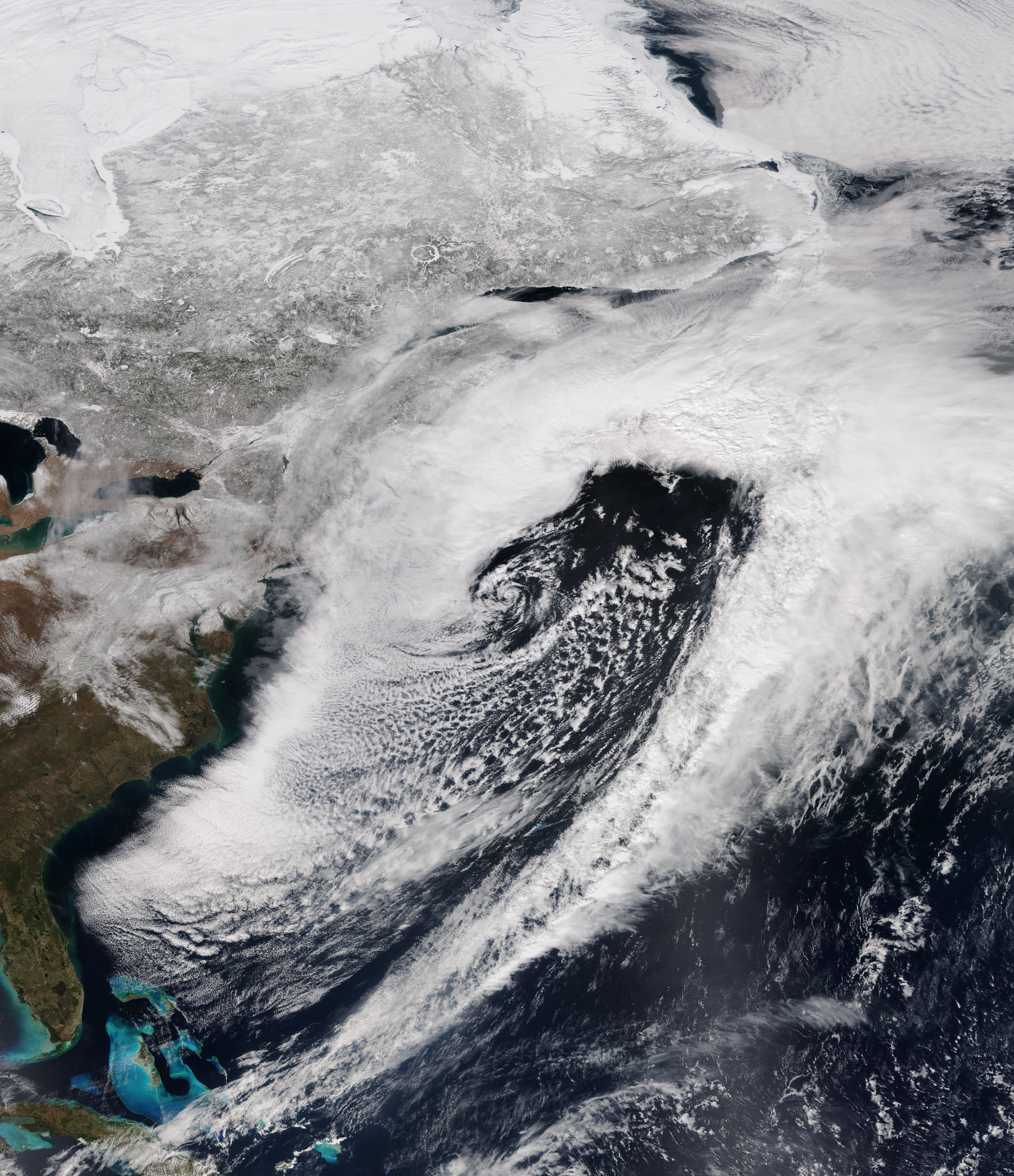
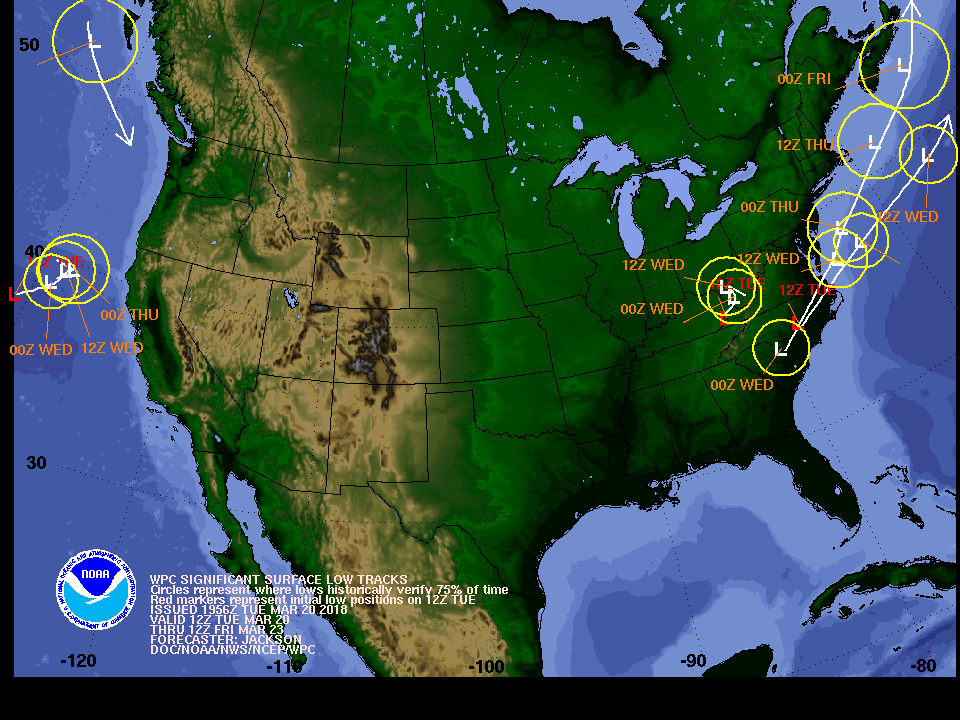
- Duration: March 20 – March 22, 2018
- Lowest pressure: 988 mb (29.18 inHg)
- Maximum snow: 20 in (51 cm)
- Fatalities: 4 fatalities
- Damage: > $900 million (2018 USD)

A fourth nor'easter began developing on March 19, affecting areas further south near the Mid-Atlantic states, dropping a swath of 12–18 inches (30–46 cm).

Having been affected by three previous nor'easters in the month of March, the impending storm caused intense preparation across the region. In the early morning hours of March 20, several hundred flights were either canceled or rerouted ahead of the storm. More than 4,000 flights were canceled on March 21, mainly because of the nor'easter. Amtrak modified or canceled service on several trains running along the Northeast Corridor on March 21 and 22 due to the nor'easter. Over 100,000 people lost power from the nor'easter.

=== Late March–mid-April cold wave ===
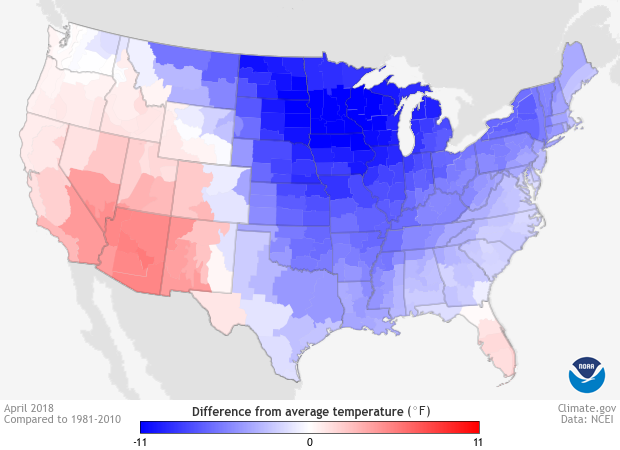
Average temperature anomalies within the United States during April 2018, showcasing widespread below-average temperatures

A period of colder-then-average temperatures impacted a large swath of the United States east of the Rocky Mountains from late March to the middle of April, resulting in one of the coldest Aprils for many areas in years, especially the Upper Midwest. This occurred as a result of a persistent pattern throughout much of April favoring high pressure within the Western United States, and troughs within the eastern half of the country, allowing cold air to funnel down. This pattern ended by May, and resulted in one of the most dramatic swings between months in the United States.

In the states of Iowa and Wisconsin, the month was the coldest April ever experienced within the states' 124-year record, surpassing April 1907 by 1.5 °F (0.9 °C). Many states experienced one of their top-ten coldest Aprils on record, with 8 other states seeing their 2nd coldest April, and the continental United States's mean April temperature of 48.9 °F (9.4 °C) made it the 13th coldest April on record and the coldest since 1997. The snow cover for most of April was the fifth-largest on record for the U.S. On April 6, Aberdeen, South Dakota set a monthly record low of −6 °F (−21 °C). The next day, the Minneapolis Twins play their coldest game in history, with a first-pitch temperature of 27 °F (−3 °C). The cold snap also caused the postponement of 28 Major League Baseball games, including the aforementioned Yankees home opener. This set a record for the most baseball games postponed in a single month.

=== Easter Monday snowstorm ===
On April 2, 2018, 5.5 inches (14 cm) of snow fell in New York City, with heavier snow in the suburbs. Snow fell at up to two inches per hour. This was their heaviest April snow in 36 years. This forced the New York Yankees to postpone their home opener. The New York Mets also postponed their game, only the second time in franchise history a game was postponed due to snow. The storm led to 53 motor vehicle crashes in just 3 hours. Portions of the metro area recorded nearly 8 inches (20 cm) of snow that day. This became the second biggest April snowstorm in Newark, New Jersey. April 2018 became the second snowiest April on record in Bridgeport, Connecticut and the eighth snowiest on record in Central Park as a result.

=== Mid-April blizzard ===
- Category 4 "Crippling" (RSI/NOAA: 15.7)
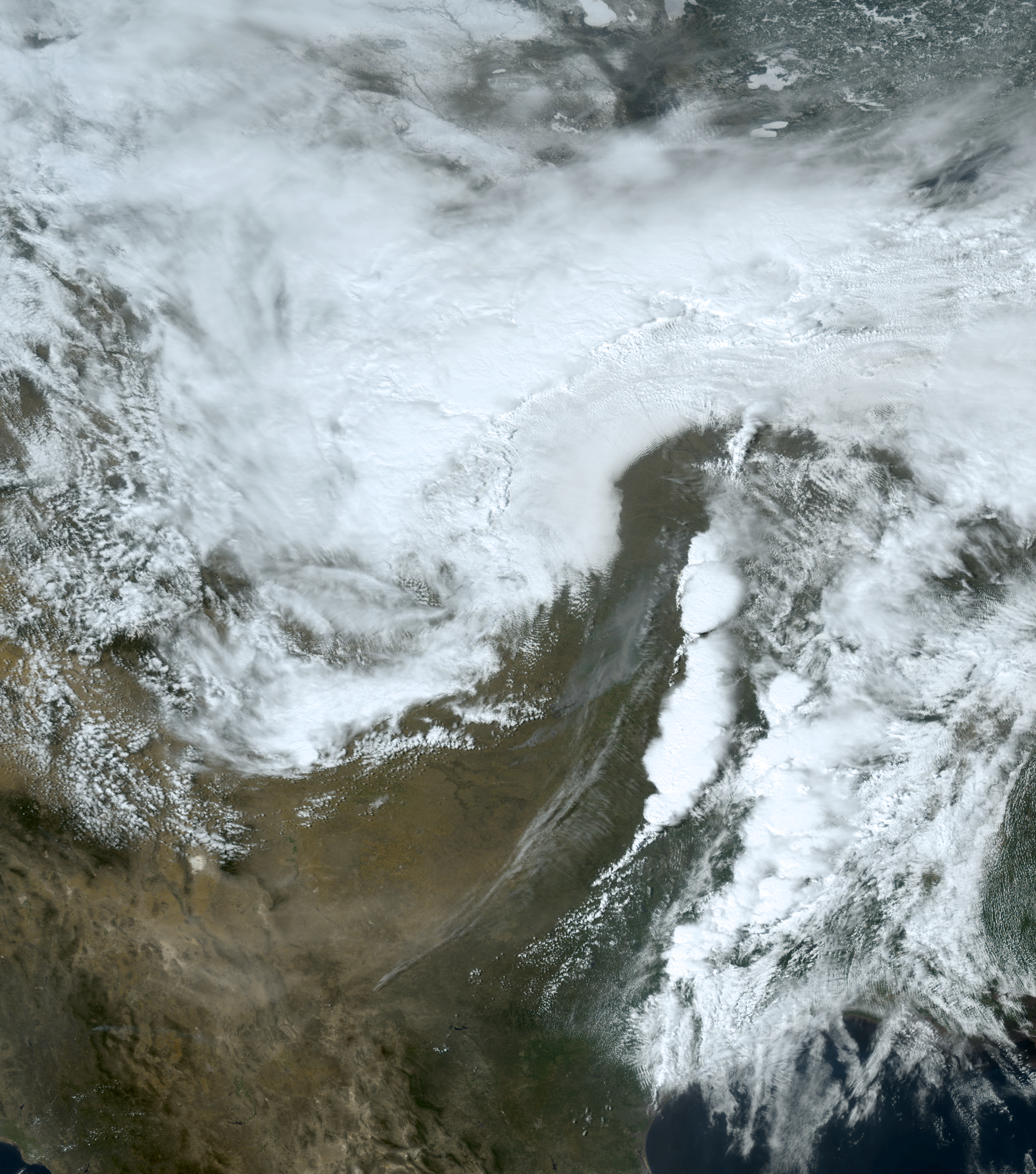
- Duration: April 12 – April 15, 2018
- Lowest pressure: 985 mb (29.09 inHg)
- Maximum snow: 33 in (84 cm)
- Fatalities: 3 fatalities
- Damage: $925 million (2018 USD)

In mid-April, a powerful weather system created heavy snow and blizzard conditions over much of the upper Midwest, as well as severe weather in the South. Green Bay, Wisconsin reported 24.2 inches (61 cm), its second-heaviest snowstorm of all time and largest ever for the month of April. Further east, a severe ice storm took place. Up to 1 inch (25 mm) was reported in Lowville, New York, in the foothills of the Tug Hill Plateau. In Ontario, a mix of snow, freezing rain, ice pellets and rain battered Toronto and the surrounding area, causing hundreds of vehicle collisions, flight cancellations, power outages and transportation delays. Freezing rain also caused problems in Ottawa, Montreal, and parts of New Brunswick.

== Records ==
=== Northern United States ===
On January 1, 2018 in Aberdeen, South Dakota, a new low temperature of −32 °F (−36 °C) was set. On January 2, a daily record low in Sioux City, Iowa was set at −28 °F (−33 °C). Other daily record low temperatures included Cedar Rapids, Iowa −23 °F (−31 °C), Pierre, South Dakota −21 °F (−29 °C), South Bend, Indiana −15 °F (−26 °C), Quincy, Illinois −12 °F (−24 °C) and Lynchburg, Virginia 3 °F (−16 °C).

=== Eastern United States ===
In Indianapolis, Indiana, the temperature reached a new low of −12 °F (−24 °C). On January 6, Raleigh–Durham International Airport in North Carolina set a record for the longest time spent below 32 °F (0 °C), 159 hours according to WTVD. The record of eight days set in 1895 and 1917 still had yet to be broken, but temperatures were not recorded every hour at that time. On January 7, temperatures in Massachusetts were so cold that part of Buzzards Bay froze.

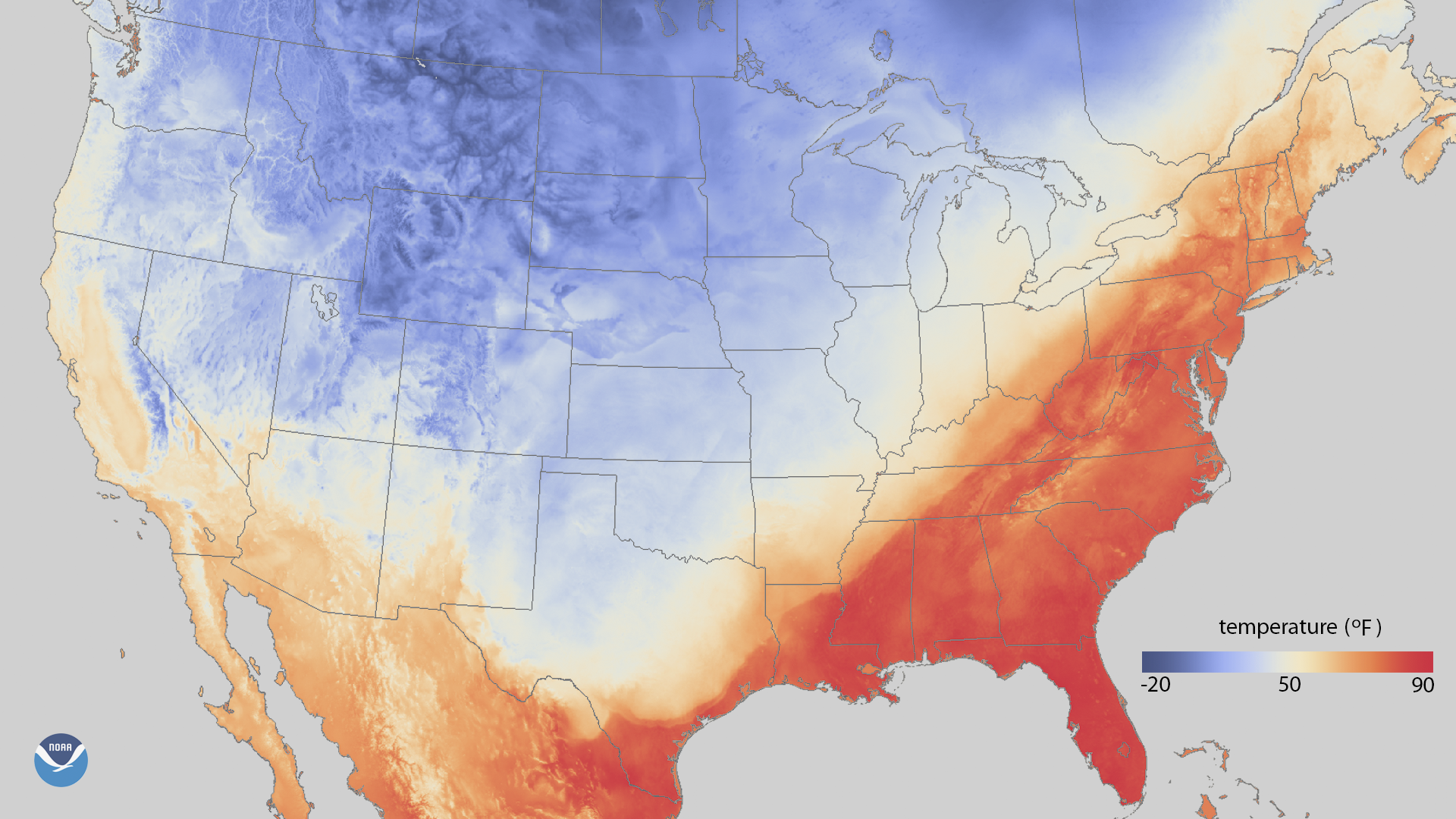
A temperature map of the wide-ranging variable conditions in the United States on February 21, 2018.

On February 21, 2018, record warm temperatures affected the eastern part of the United States. Numerous state record highs were set, including a new February record high of 79 °F (26 °C) in New York, 77 °F (25 °C) in Vermont, New Hampshire, and Maine, 83 °F (28 °C) in New Jersey, and 80 °F (27 °C) in Massachusetts and Ohio. February 20 also saw record high February temperatures in Pittsburgh (78 °F (26 °C)), Indianapolis (77 °F (25 °C)), Charlestown, WV (81 °F (27 °C)), and Cincinnati (79 °F (26 °C)). Record high lows were also set, including one as high as 66 °F (19 °C) in Louisville. This was due to a record breaking ridge. Washington DC hit 82 °F (28 °C), the warmest so early in the season. Eight states had record warm February's in the United States, them being Alabama, Florida, Georgia, North Carolina, South Carolina, Connecticut, Rhode Island and Massachusetts. In addition, flooding on the Ohio River made this a record wet February across Arkansas, Tennessee, Missouri, Illinois, Indiana, and Pennsylvania.

=== Canada ===
Some Canadian cities had some of their coldest New Years on record, affecting plans in towns such as Calgary (which forecast a high of −26 °C (−15 °F)), Ottawa (overnight low of −24 °C (−11 °F)), and Toronto (−15 °C (5 °F), −30 °C (−22 °F) after wind chill), although the CBC reported that Montreal and Winnipeg decided to go on without any changes. On January 5, Toronto broke a 59-year-old record with a morning low temperature of −23 °C (−9 °F) at the Pearson International Airport weather station.

== Season effects ==
This is a table of all of the events that have occurred in the 2017–18 North American winter. It includes their duration, damage, impacted locations, and death totals. Deaths in parentheses are additional and indirect (an example of an indirect death would be a traffic accident), but were still related to that storm. All of the damage figures are in 2018 USD.

Regional snowfall index scale
C0	C1	C2	C3	C4	C5

2017–18 North American winter season statistics
Event name	Dates active	RSI category	RSI value	Highest gust mph (km/h)	Minimum pressure (mbar)	Maximum snow in (cm)	Maximum ice in (mm)	Areas affected	Damage (2018 USD)	Deaths
Late October bomb cyclone	October 29 – 30	N/A	N/A	84 (135)	975	8.5 (22)	N/A	Mid-Atlantic states, Northeastern United States, Eastern Canada	≥ $100 million	None
Early December winter storm	December 7 – 10	Category 2	3.077	N/A	942	25 (64)	N/A	Southeastern United States, Mid-Atlantic states, Northeastern United States, Eastern Canada	N/A	7
Early January blizzard	January 2 – 5	Category 1	2.55	126 (203)	949	24 (61)	0.5 (1.3)	Cuba, The Bahamas, Bermuda, Southeastern United States, Northeastern United States, New England, Atlantic Canada	$1.1 billion	22
Mid-January winter storm	January 16 – 17	N/A	N/A	N/A	N/A	12 (30)	N/A	Southeastern United States, Northeastern United States	Unknown	N/A
Mid-February Mid-Atlantic winter storm	February 17 – 18	N/A	N/A	N/A	1007	10 (25.4)	0.1 (2.5)	Northeastern United States, Atlantic Canada	Unknown	N/A
March 1–3 nor'easter	March 1 – 3	Category 1	2.185	97 (156)	974	39.3 (100)	N/A	Northeastern United States, Canada	$2.25 billion	9
March 6–8 nor'easter	March 6 – 8	Category 1	2.475	59 (95)	986	36 (91)	N/A	Northeastern United States, Canada	$525 million	2
March 11–15 nor'easter	March 12 – 14	Category 2	4.335	81 (130)	966	29 (73)	N/A	Northeastern United States, Canada	$670,000	N/A
March 20–22 nor'easter	March 20 – 22	Category 1	1.6	79 (127)	988	20.1 (51)	0.2 (5.1)	Midwestern, Southeastern and Northeastern United States	$900 million	4
Mid-April blizzard	April 13 – 15	Category 4	15.7	Unknown	985	33 (84)	1 (25)	Northern United States	$925 million	3
Season aggregates
7 RSI storms	October 29 – April 15				949	39.3 (100)	1 (25)		≥ $$5.7 billion	98

== See also ==
- 2017–18 European windstorm season

== Notes ==
Preceded by 2016–17	North American winters 2017–18	Succeeded by 2018–19
