= October 2017 nor'easter =

Meteorological bomb that affected United States and Canada

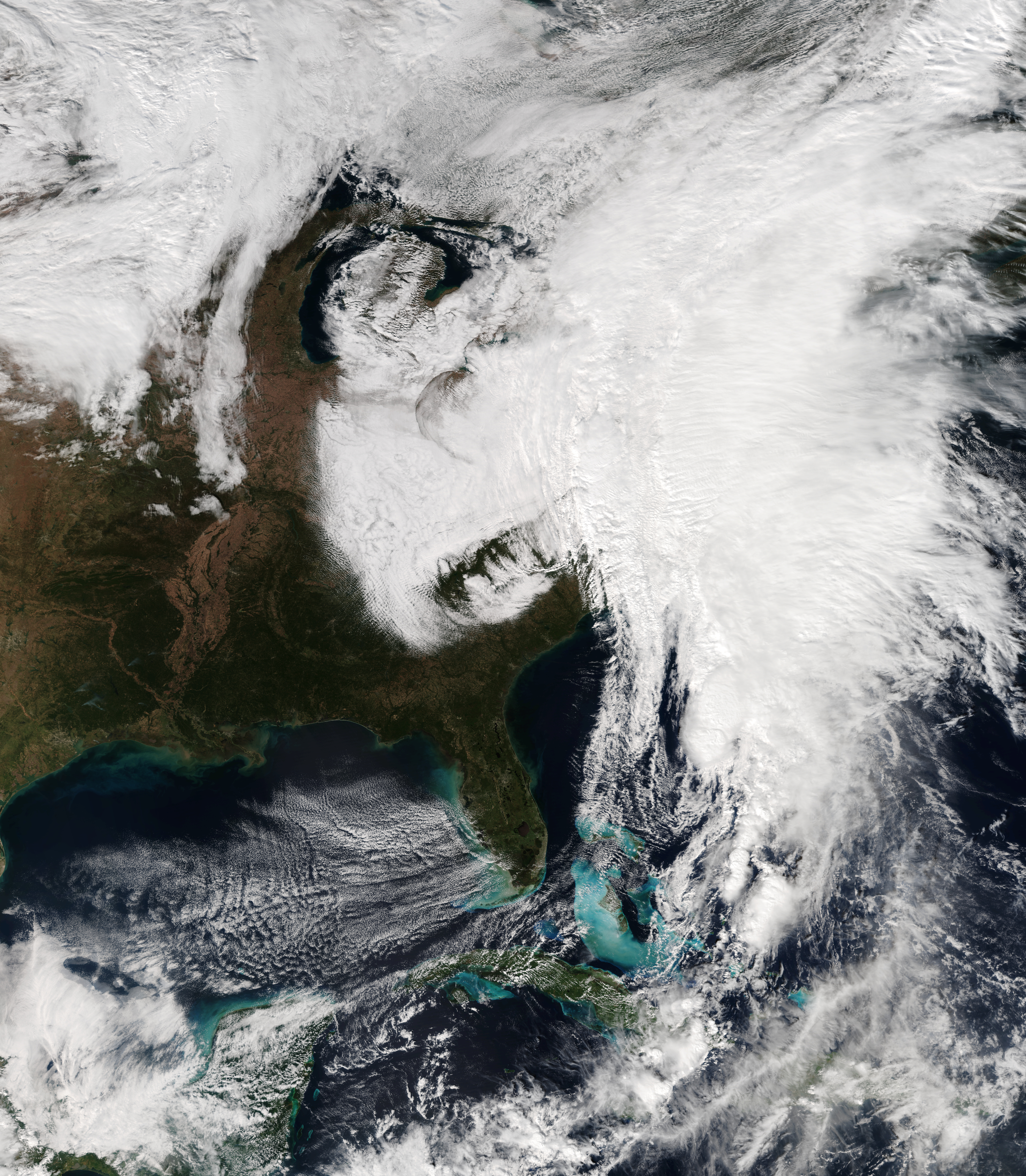
- Suomi NPP satellite imagery of the bomb cyclone developing over North Carolina on October 29

Meteorological history
- Formed: October 29, 2017
- Dissipated: October 31, 2017

Nor'easter
- Highest gusts: 93 mph (150 km/h) at Popponesset Beach, Massachusetts
- Lowest pressure: 975 hPa (mbar); 28.79 inHg
- Max. rainfall: 7.00 in (178 mm) at Hunter, New York
- Max. snowfall: 8.4 in (21 cm) in Davis, West Virginia

Overall effects
- Fatalities: None reported
- Damage: >$100 million (2017 USD)
- Areas affected: Mid-Atlantic states, Northeastern United States, Eastern Canada
- Power outages: >1,300,000
- Part of the 2017–18 North American winter

The October 2017 nor'easter was a major explosive cyclogenesis storm, also called a bomb cyclone, in the Northeastern United States and Atlantic Canada from October 29–31, 2017. Forming from an extratropical cyclone on October 29 the system moved rapidly up the East Coast of the United States, bombing out with a minimum pressure of 975 millibars (28.8 inHg) on October 30. It brought heavy rain and extremely strong winds, and power outages, over 1.3 million customers being without power in the Northeast. Hurricane-force wind gusts resulted in downed trees, power lines, and widespread damage to buildings. The number of power outages in the state of Maine surpassed the Ice Storm of 1998.

== Meteorological history ==
On October 29, an extratropical cyclone powered partially by leftover moisture from Tropical Storm Philippe moved northeast over South Florida and began to move up the U.S. East Coast. The moisture from the system soon began to feed into a cold front, resulting in rapid intensification of the low pressure as it moved up the coast. On October 30, the storm underwent explosive cyclogenesis, deepening from 1,005 millibars (29.7 inHg) to a peak intensity of 975 millibars (28.8 inHg) over New England. After maintaining its intensity for some time, it then began to rapidly weaken, before dissipating on October 31.

== Preparations and impact ==
=== Mid-Atlantic states ===
Tropical storm-force wind gusts affected much of the Mid-Atlantic, and rainfall totals of 3–5 in (76–127 mm) were recorded in interior areas. Wind gusts of 40–60 mph (64–97 km/h) were reported along the coast. Downed trees and power lines were reported as a result of the storm in the Washington, D.C. area as well. Hunter, New York recorded the most rain at 7.00 in (178 mm), with 3.03 in (77 mm) of rain falling in Central Park. The Long Island Rail Road was briefly suspended due to the storm.

=== New England ===
30-hour surface analysis loop of the system

In Maine, over 400,000 power outages were reported, some lasting over a week. Surpassing the Ice Storm of 1998, the storm became the largest weather-related power outage event in Maine history. There was widespread tree damage across the state, and some roads in coastal regions of the state were impassable for over a week. Additionally, portions of U.S. Route 2 near the border with New Hampshire was also washed out.

In New Hampshire, nearly 300,000 power outages were reported, and the storm was the fourth-largest power outage in New Hampshire history. Numerous roads throughout the state were closed by washouts from heavy rain or from fallen trees, slowing initial damage assessment response. Gusts on Mount Washington reached 130 miles per hour (210 km/h). Damage in New Hampshire totalled $4.1 million.

In Vermont, a wind gust of 63 mph (101 km/h) was recorded at the Burlington International Airport. Approximately 50,000 customers lost power in the state, and most had power restored within the next five days. Many schools were closed throughout the state, and the state's largest utility reported that over 500 field crews were restoring power on October 30. Damage amounted to $3 million.

A wind gust of 93 mph (150 km/h) occurred in Cape Cod, Massachusetts. In the state, damage amounted to $350,000. 170,000 power outages occurred in the state of Connecticut.

=== Eastern Canada ===
Heavy rain fell in Quebec and Ontario, resulting in power outages and travel problems. The Ottawa area recorded up to 99 mm (3.9 in) of rain on October 30.

== See also ==
- Tropical Storm Philippe
- Ice Storm of 1998
- November 2009 nor'easter
- April 12–13, 2020 nor'easter
