= December 2017–January 2018 North American cold wave =

Weather event in North America

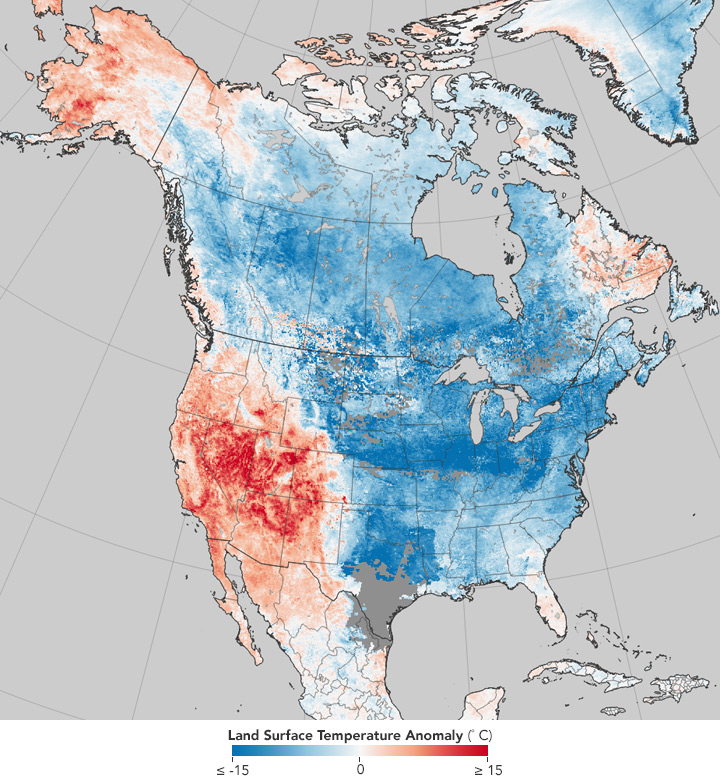
- Temperature anomaly map of North America during the week of December 26, 2017 to January 2, 2018, showcasing the below-average temperatures.

Meteorological history
- Formed: December 23, 2017
- Dissipated: January 18, 2018

Cold wave
- Lowest temperature: −45 °F (−43 °C) in Embarrass, MN on December 31

Overall effects
- Fatalities: 39
- Areas affected: Canada, East Coast of the United States, Midwestern United States
- Part of the 2017–18 North American winter

The December 2017–January 2018 North American cold wave was an extreme weather event in North America in which record low temperatures gripped much of the Central, Eastern United States, and parts of Central and Eastern Canada. Starting in late December as a result of the southward shift of the polar vortex, extremely cold conditions froze the eastern United States in the last few days of 2017 as well as into the new year. Following a brief respite in mid-January, cold temperatures swung back into the eastern U.S. shortly afterwards. The cold wave finally dissolved by around January 19, as near-average temperatures returned.

Several winter weather events accompanied the cold wave, the most significant one was a powerful blizzard that impacted the Northeastern U.S. in the first few days of 2018. Some of these events impacted areas that normally do not receive snow, such as Louisiana and Texas. In an extremely rare event, Tallahassee, Florida in extreme north Florida received trace amounts of frozen precipitation for the first time in more than 30 years. In addition, many places broke records for lowest temperatures in the final week of 2017 and the first week of 2018.

== History ==
Like most normal cold waves, the cold wave was caused by the southwards movement of the polar vortex into the United States due to changes in the jet stream in late December 2017. Because of an "omega" block pattern that set up around Christmas time – a shift to a pattern with a ridge settling over the western continental U.S. and a trough in the central- to eastern parts of the U.S., below-average temperatures occurred through much of the Lower 48 for the final week of 2017 – leading to many records being broken. The pattern continued into the first week of 2018, with more record lows being set following a significant blizzard that impacted the Northeastern United States in early January. By January 11, warmer temperatures had surged northeastwards, although following a winter storm a few days later, cold temperatures returned to the Northeast.

The cold wave had an impact on New Year's Eve celebrations in the affected regions; some Canadian cities chose to scale back their ancillary outdoor festivities (but still scheduling celebrations at midnight), including Calgary (which forecast a high of −26 °C (−15 °F)), Ottawa (overnight low of −24 °C (−11 °F)), and Toronto (−15 °C (5 °F), −30 °C (−22 °F) after wind chill). Montreal and Winnipeg decided to go on without any changes. New Year's Eve celebrations at New York City's Times Square were the second-coldest on record, at 9 °F (−13 °C) (−4 °F (−20 °C) after wind chill).

On December 31, 2017, the New England Patriots and Tennessee Titans of the National Football League (NFL) both played their coldest home games in franchise history, with the Patriots (in Foxborough, Massachusetts) recording a kickoff temperature of 13 °F (−11 °C) and a wind chill of −2 °F (−19 °C), and the Titans (in Nashville, Tennessee) with a kickoff temperature of 23 °F (−5 °C).

== Record temperatures ==
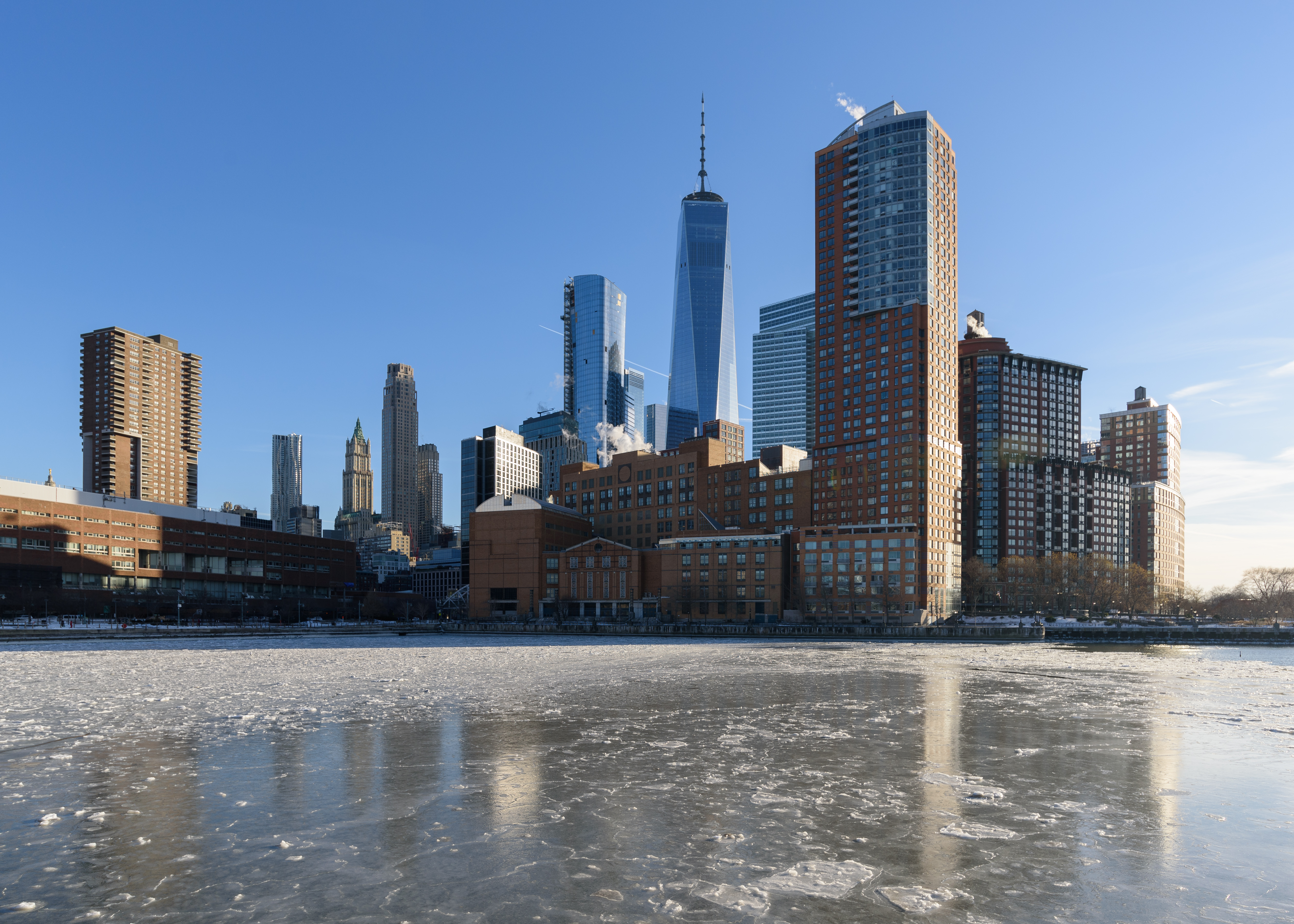
The Hudson River in New York City, frozen over during the first week of January

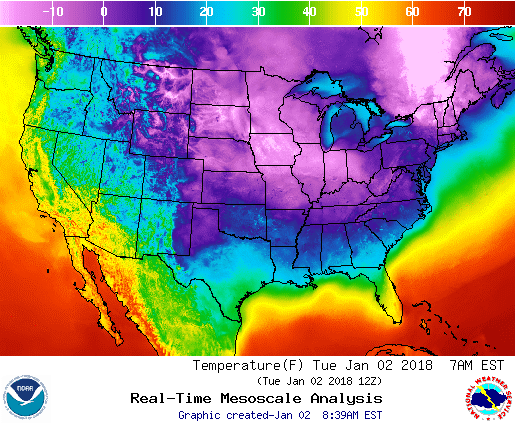
Very frigid conditions across the country early on January 2, 2018

In 2017, Watertown, New York and Buffalo, New York, had their coldest final week on record for the year. The National Weather Service indicated that a temperature of −15 °F (−26 °C) took place in Omaha, Nebraska on December 31, 2017, lower than the previous record set in 1884. Des Moines dipped to −20 °F (−29 °C). December 28 saw Flint get to −18 °F (−28 °C), an all time December low. December 2017 became the 3rd coldest December in the history of Morrisville, Vermont.

On January 1, 2018, in Aberdeen, South Dakota, a new low temperature of −32 °F (−36 °C) was set. In Indianapolis, Indiana, the temperature reached a new low of −12 °F (−24 °C). On January 2, a daily record low in Sioux City, Iowa was set at −28 °F (−33 °C). Other daily record low temperatures included Cedar Rapids, Iowa −23 °F (−31 °C), Pierre, South Dakota −21 °F (−29 °C), South Bend, Indiana −15 °F (−26 °C), Quincy, Illinois −12 °F (−24 °C) and Lynchburg, Virginia 3 °F (−16 °C). On January 5, Toronto broke a 59-year-old record with a morning low temperature of −23 °C (−9 °F) at the Pearson International Airport weather station.

On January 6, Raleigh–Durham International Airport in North Carolina set a record for the longest time spent below 32 °F (0 °C), 159 hours according to WTVD. The record of eight days set in 1895 and 1917 still had yet to be broken, but temperatures were not recorded every hour at that time. On January 7, temperatures in Massachusetts were so cold that part of Buzzards Bay froze. That day saw new record lows established in Worcester, Providence and Hartford, and tied in Boston. During the cold wave, Boston used two million barrels of oil to heat their homes, more than what is burned in an average year, and more than twice all the oil burned in 2016.

The first week of 2018 became the coldest first week on record of any year in New York City, Pittsburgh, Raleigh, Charlotte, Tallahassee, Detroit and Cincinnati. New Orleans tied their coldest first week of the year that was previously set in 1970. The second coldest first week of the year was set in Jacksonville, Cleveland, Indianapolis, and Boston. Dulles International Airport saw their longest cold wave on record, while Bridgeport, Connecticut saw its longest streak of subfreezing temperatures.

== See also ==
- Weather of 2018
- Early 2014 North American cold wave
- November 2014 North American cold wave
- February 2015 North American cold wave
- February 2021 North American cold wave
- December 2022 North American winter storm
- 2017–18 North American winter
