= March 2018 nor'easter =

March 2018 nor'easter may refer to any of four nor'easters that affected the East Coast of the United States in March 2018:

- March 1–3, 2018 nor'easter
- March 6–8, 2018 nor'easter
- March 11–15, 2018 nor'easter
- March 20–22, 2018 nor'easter
