= Nor'easter =

Type of cyclone occurring in the northern Atlantic coast of North America

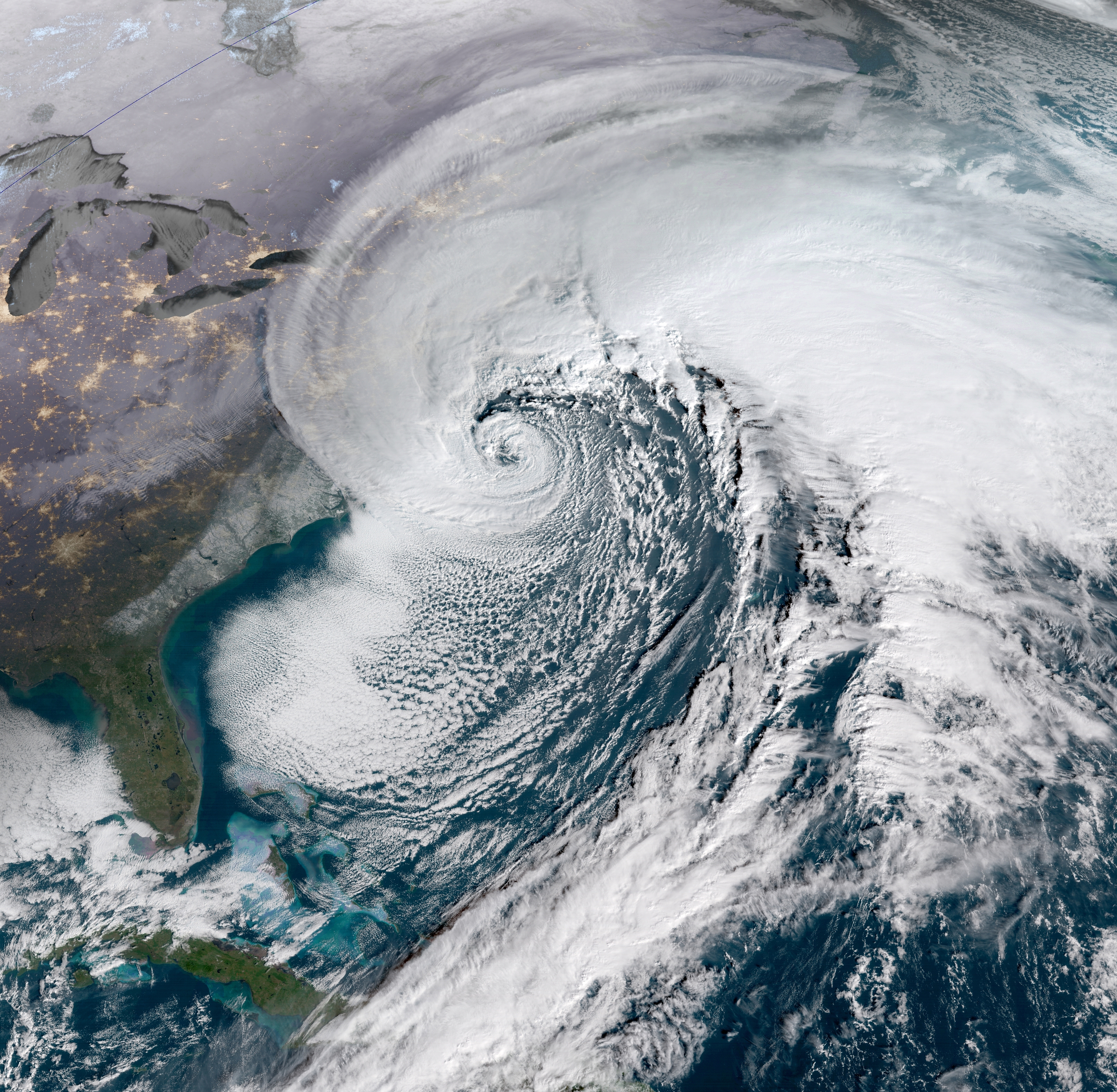
Nor'easter off the New England coast of the United States responsible for the January 2018 North American blizzard

A nor'easter (also northeaster; see below) is a large-scale extratropical cyclone in the western North Atlantic Ocean. The name derives from the direction of the winds that blow from the northeast. Typically, such storms originate as a low-pressure area that forms within 100 miles (160 km) of the shore between North Carolina and Massachusetts. The precipitation pattern is similar to that of other extratropical storms, although nor'easters are usually accompanied by heavy rain or snow, and can cause severe coastal flooding, coastal erosion, hurricane-force winds, or blizzard conditions. They tend to develop most often and most powerfully between the months of November and March, because of the difference in temperature between the cold polar air mass coming down from central Canada and the warm ocean waters off the upper East Coast. The susceptible regions—the upper north Atlantic coast of the United States and the Atlantic Provinces of Canada—are generally impacted by nor'easters a few times each winter.

== Etymology and usage ==
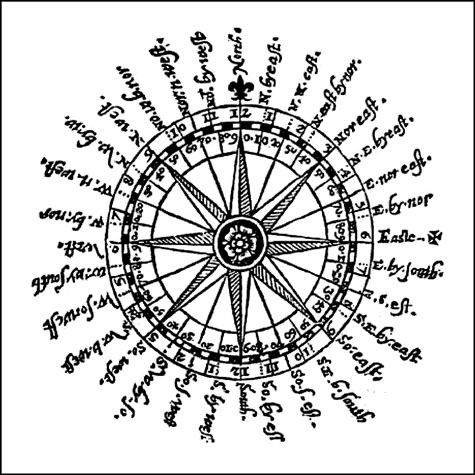
Compass card (1607), featuring the spelling "Noreast"

Now the first of December was covered with snow

So was the Turnpike from Stockbridge to Boston

— James Taylor, "Sweet Baby James"

The term nor'easter came to American English by way of British English. As noted in a January 2006 editorial by William Sisson, editor of Soundings magazine, use of "nor'easter" to describe the storm system is common along the U.S. East Coast.

Early recorded uses of the contraction nor (for north) in combinations such as nor'-east and nor-nor-west, as reported by the Oxford English Dictionary, date to the late 16th century, as in John Davis's 1594 The Seaman's Secrets: "Noreast by North raiseth a degree in sayling 24 leagues." The spelling appears, for instance, on a compass card published in 1607. Thus, the manner of pronouncing from memory the 32 points of the compass, known in maritime training as "boxing the compass", is described by Ansted with pronunciations "Nor'east (or west)," "Nor' Nor'-east (or west)," "Nor'east b' east (or west)," and so forth. According to the OED, the first recorded use of the term "nor'easter" occurs in 1837 in a translation of Aristophanes. The term "nor'easter" naturally developed from the historical spellings and pronunciations of the compass points and the direction of wind or sailing.

19th-century Downeast mariners pronounced the compass point "north northeast" as "no'nuth-east", and so on. For decades, Edgar Comee, of Brunswick, Maine, waged a determined battle against use of the term "nor'easter" by the press, which usage he considered "a pretentious and altogether lamentable affectation" and "the odious, even loathsome, practice of landlubbers who would be seen as salty as the sea itself". His efforts, which included mailing hundreds of postcards, were profiled, just before his death in 2005 at the age of 88, in The New Yorker.

Despite the efforts of Comee and others, the term was frequently used by the press in the 19th century.

- The Hartford Times reported on a storm striking New York in December 1839, and observed, "We Yankees had a share of this same "noreaster," but it was quite moderate in comparison to the one of the 15h inst."
- Thomas Bailey Aldrich, in his semi-autobiographical work The Story of a Bad Boy (1870), wrote "We had had several slight flurries of hail and snow before, but this was a regular nor'easter".
- In her story "In the Gray Goth" (1869) Elizabeth Stuart Phelps Ward wrote "...and there was snow in the sky now, setting in for a regular nor'easter".
- John H. Tice, in A new system of meteorology, designed for schools and private students (1878), wrote "During this battle, the dreaded, disagreeable and destructive Northeaster rages over the New England, the Middle States, and southward. No nor'easter ever occurs except when there is a high barometer headed off and driven down upon Nova Scotia and Lower Canada."

Usage existed into the 20th century in the form of:

- Current event description, as the Publication Committee of the New York Charity Organization Society wrote in Charities and the commons: a weekly journal of philanthropy and social advance, Volume 19 (1908): "In spite of a heavy "nor'easter," the worst that has visited the New England coast in years, the hall was crowded."
- Historical reference, as used by Mary Rogers Bangs in Old Cape Cod (1917): "In December of 1778, the Federal brig General Arnold, Magee master and twelve Barnstable men among the crew, drove ashore on the Plymouth flats during a furious nor'easter, the "Magee storm" that mariners, for years after, used as a date to reckon from."
- A "common contraction for "northeaster"", as listed in Ralph E. Huschke's Glossary of Meteorology (1959).

According to Boston Globe writer Jan Freeman, "from 1975 to 1980, journalists used the nor'easter spelling only once in five mentions of such storms; in the past year (2003), more than 80 percent of northeasters were spelled nor'easter".

The Pacific Northwest is also affected by a similar class of powerful extratropical cyclones, known as Pacific Northwest windstorms. While the storms on the East Coast are named "nor'easters", the Pacific Northwest windstorms are not called "nor'westers" because the cyclones' primary winds can blow from any direction, while the primary winds in nor'easters usually blow from the northeast.

== Geography and formation characteristics ==
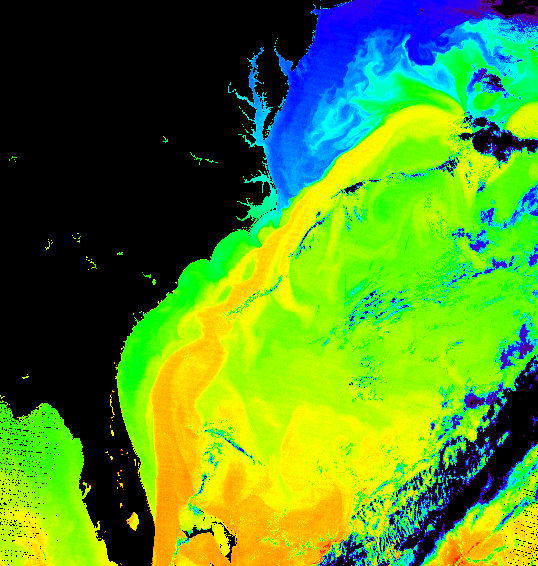
Surface temperature of the sea off the east coast of North America. The corridor in yellow gives the position of the Gulf Stream.

=== Formation ===
Nor'easters develop in response to the sharp contrast in the warm Gulf Stream ocean current coming up from the tropical Atlantic and the cold air masses coming down from Canada. Very cold and dry air rushing southward and meeting up with the warm Gulf stream current, which is typically near 70 °F (21 °C) even mid-winter, often causes low-pressure areas to develop and intensify.

In the upper atmosphere, the strong winds of the jet stream remove and replace rising air from the Atlantic more rapidly than the Atlantic air is replaced at lower levels; this and the Coriolis force help develop a strong storm. The storm tracks northeast along the East Coast, normally from North Carolina to Long Island, then tracks east toward the waters off Cape Cod. Counterclockwise winds around the low-pressure system blow the moist air over land. The relatively warm, moist air meets cold air coming southward from Canada. The low increases the surrounding pressure difference, which causes the very different air masses to collide at a faster speed. When the difference in temperature of the air masses is larger, so is the storm's instability, turbulence, and thus severity.

The nor'easters taking the East Coast track usually indicates the presence of a high-pressure area in the vicinity of Nova Scotia. Sometimes a nor'easter will move slightly inland and bring rain to the cities on the coastal plain (New York City, Philadelphia, Baltimore, etc.) and snow in New England (Boston northward). On occasion, nor'easters can pull cold air as far south as Virginia or North Carolina, bringing wet snow inland in those areas for a brief time. Such a storm will rapidly intensify, tracking northward and following the topography of the East Coast, sometimes continuing to grow stronger during its entire existence. A nor'easter usually reaches its peak intensity while off the Canadian coast. The storm then reaches Arctic areas, and can reach intensities equal to that of a weak hurricane. It then meanders throughout the North Atlantic and can last for several weeks.

Meteorologists use the Miller classification to determine the track and severity of a nor'easter. The technique is named after J.E. Miller, who created the system in 1946. The Miller classification classified storms into two categories: type A and type B. Type A storms form in the Gulf of Mexico or along the coast of Georgia or South Carolina, and cause heavy snow mainly to parts of the inland upper south, Mid-Atlantic, New England, and Atlantic Canada. Type B storms form from a parent low-pressure system over the Ohio Valley, which then undergoes a center reformation over Gulf Stream off North Carolina or Virginia. These storms can bring a swath of wintry precipitation from the Great Plains and the Ohio River Valley to the Middle Atlantic and New England.

=== Characteristics ===
Nor'easters are usually formed by an area of vorticity associated with an upper-level disturbance or from a kink in a frontal surface that causes a surface low-pressure area to develop. Such storms are very often formed from the merging of several weaker storms, a "parent storm", and a polar jet stream mixing with the tropical jet stream.

Temperatures usually fall significantly due to the presence of the cooler air from winds that typically come from a northeasterly direction. During a single storm, the precipitation can range from a torrential downpour to a fine mist. All precipitation types can occur in a nor'easter. High wind gusts, which can reach hurricane strength, are also associated with a nor'easter. On very rare occasions, such as in the nor'easter in 1978, North American blizzard of 2006, Early February 2013 North American blizzard, and January 2018 North American blizzard, the center of the storm can take on the circular shape more typical of a hurricane and have a small "dry slot" near the center, which can be mistaken for an eye, although it is not an eye.

==== Difference from tropical cyclones ====
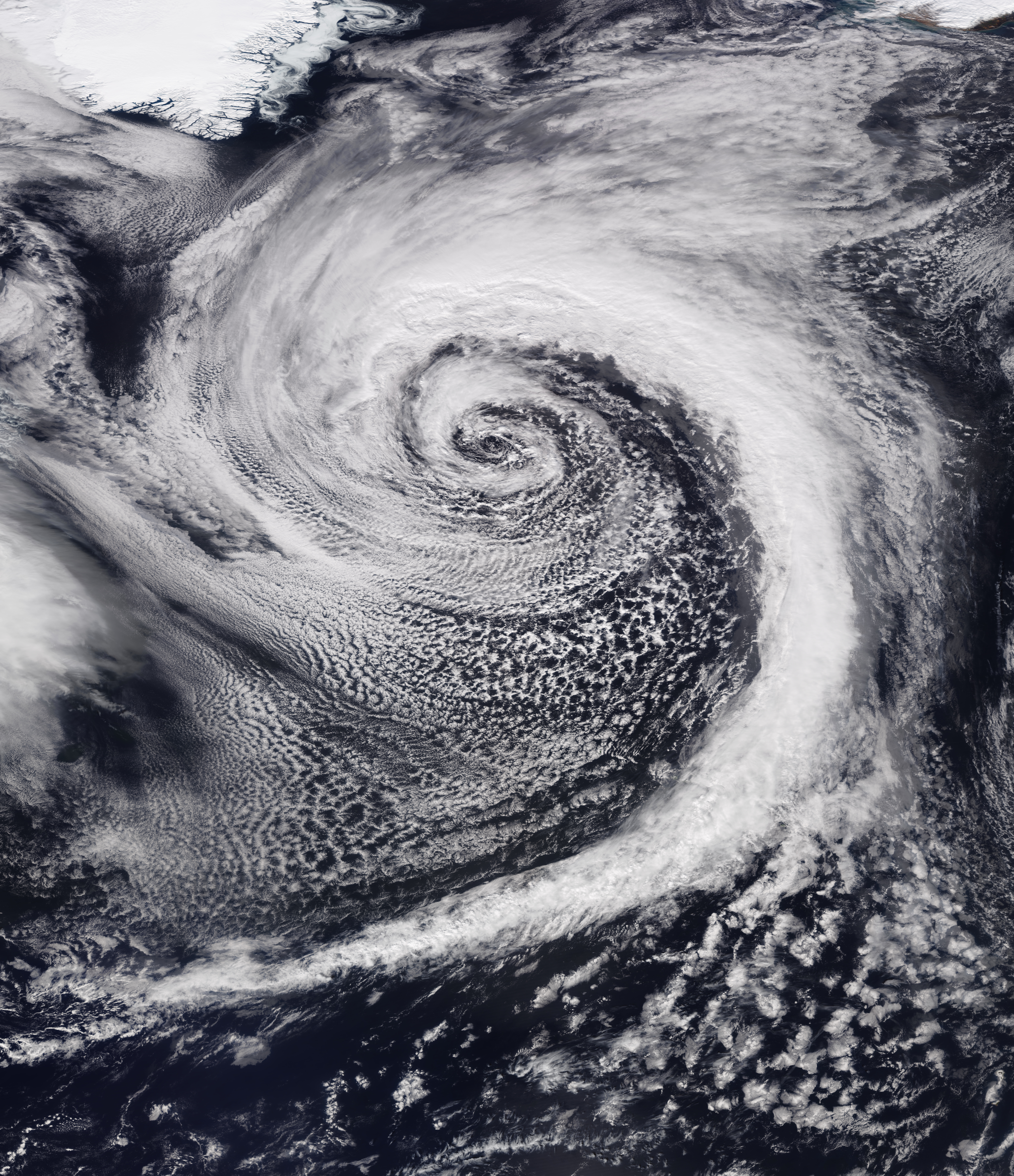
A powerful Nor'easter over the North Atlantic Ocean on 20 March 2022; Greenland at the top left, and Iceland at the top right

Often, people mistake nor'easters for tropical cyclones and do not differentiate between the two weather systems. Nor'easters differ from tropical cyclones in that nor'easters are cold-core low-pressure systems, meaning that they thrive on drastic changes in temperature of Canadian air and warm Atlantic waters. Tropical cyclones are warm-core low-pressure systems, which means they thrive on purely warm temperatures. However, in rare cases, such as the 1991 Perfect Storm, a small tropical cyclone can develop inside the warm seclusion of an intense nor'easter if the sea surface temperatures are sufficiently warm. Nor'easters can rarely also turn into tropical or subtropical cyclones, such as Tropical Storm Wanda in 2021.

==== Difference from other extratropical storms ====
A nor'easter is a strong extratropical cyclone, often experiencing explosive cyclogenesis. While this formation occurs in many places around the world, nor'easters are unique for their combination of northeast winds and moisture content of the swirling clouds. Similar conditions sometimes occur during winter in the Pacific Northeast (northern Japan and northwards) with winds from NNW. In Europe, similar weather systems with such severity are hardly possible; the moisture content of the clouds is usually not high enough to cause flooding or heavy snow, although northeasterly winds can be strong.

=== Geography ===
The eastern United States, from North Carolina to Maine, and Eastern Canada can experience nor'easters, though most often they affect the areas in the Atlantic Canada and New England. The effects of a nor'easter sometimes bring high surf, strong winds and rain as far south as coastal South Carolina. Nor'easters cause a significant amount of beach erosion in these areas, as well as flooding in the associated low-lying areas.

Biologists at the Woods Hole Oceanographic Institution on Cape Cod have determined nor'easters are an environmental factor for red tides on the Atlantic coast.

== List of notable nor'easters ==
A list of nor'easters with short description about the events.

Event	Date	Description	Ref(s)
Great Blizzard of 1888	March 11–14, 1888	One of the worst blizzards in U.S. history. Dropped 40–50 inches (100–130 cm) of snow, killing 400 people, mostly in New York.	
Great Appalachian Storm of November 1950	November 24–30, 1950	A very severe storm that dumped more than 30 inches (76 cm) of snow in many major metropolitan areas along the eastern United States, with record-breaking temperatures, and hurricane-force winds. The storm killed 353 people.	
Ash Wednesday Storm of 1962	March 5–9, 1962	Caused severe tidal flooding and blizzard conditions from the Mid-Atlantic to New England, killing 40 people.	
Eastern Canadian Blizzard of March 1971	March 3–5, 1971	Dropped over 32 inches (81 cm) of snow over areas of eastern Canada, killing at least 30 people.	
Groundhog Day gale of 1976	February 1–5, 1976	Caused blizzard conditions for much of New England and eastern Canada, dropping a maximum of 56 inches (140 cm) of snow.	
Northeastern United States blizzard of 1978	February 5–7, 1978	A catastrophic storm, which dropped over 27 inches (69 cm) of snow in areas of New England, killing a total of 100 people, mainly people trapped in their cars on metropolitan Boston's inner beltway and in Rhode Island.	
1991 Perfect Storm (the "Perfect Storm," combined Nor'easter/hurricane)	October 28 – November 2, 1991	Very unusual storm in which a tropical and extratropical system interacted strangely, with tidal surge that caused severe damage to coastal areas (especially in Massachusetts), killing 13 people.	
December 1992 nor'easter	December 10–12, 1992	A powerful storm which caused severe coastal flooding throughout much of the northeastern United States.	
1993 Storm of the Century	March 12–15, 1993	A superstorm which formed in the Gulf of Mexico, and brought high storm surge to Florida. It then grew so large that it affected the entire eastern U.S., in addition to parts of eastern Canada and Cuba, and was ranked as a Category 5 winter storm on the Regional Snowfall Index. It caused $6.65 billion (2008 USD) in damage and killed 310 people.	
Christmas 1994 nor'easter	December 22–26, 1994	An intense storm which affected the east coast of the U.S. and exhibited traits of a tropical cyclone.	
North American blizzard of 1996	January 6–10, 1996	Severe snowstorm which brought up to 4 feet (120 cm) of snow to areas of the Mid-Atlantic and Northeastern U.S.	
North American blizzard of 2003	February 14–22, 2003	Dropped over 2 feet (61 cm) of snow in several major cities, including Boston and New York City, affected large areas of the Northeastern and Mid-Atlantic U.S., and killed a total of 27 people.	
White Juan of 2004	February 17–23, 2004	A blizzard that affected Atlantic Canada, crippling transportation in Halifax, Nova Scotia, and dropping over 37 inches (94 cm) of snow in areas.	
North American blizzard of 2005	January 20–23, 2005	Brought blizzard conditions to southern New England and dropped over 40 inches (100 cm) of snow in areas of Massachusetts.	
North American blizzard of 2006	February 11–13, 2006	A powerful storm that developed a hurricane-like eye when off the coast of New Jersey. It brought over 30 inches (76 cm) of snow in some areas and killed 3 people.	
April 2007 nor'easter	April 13–17, 2007	An unusually late storm that dumped heavy snow in parts of Northern New England and Canada and heavy rains elsewhere. The storm caused a total of 18 fatalities.	
November 2009 nor'easter	November 11–17, 2009	Formed from the remnants of Hurricane Ida, produced moderate storm surge, strong winds and very heavy rainfall throughout the Mid-Atlantic region. It caused US$300 million (2009) in damage and killed six people.	
December 2009 North American blizzard	December 16–20, 2009	A major blizzard which affected large metropolitan areas, including New York City, Philadelphia, Providence, and Boston. In some of these areas, the storm brought up to 2 feet (61 cm) of snow.	
March 2010 nor'easter	March 12–16, 2010	A slow-moving nor'easter that devastated the Northeastern United States. Winds of up to 70 miles per hour (110 km/h) snapped trees and power lines, resulting in over 1 million homes and businesses left without electricity. The storm produced over 10 inches (25 cm) of rain in New England, causing widespread flooding of urban and low-lying areas. The storm also caused extensive coastal flooding and beach erosion.	
December 2010 North American blizzard	December 5, 2010 – January 15, 2011	A severe and long-lasting blizzard which dropped up to 36 inches (91 cm) of snow throughout much of the eastern United States.	
January 8–13, 2011 North American blizzard and January 25–27, 2011 North American blizzard	January 8–13 and January 25–27, 2011	In January 2011, two nor'easters struck the East Coast of the United States just two weeks apart and severely crippled New England and the Mid-Atlantic. During the first of the two storms, a record of 40 inches (100 cm) was recorded in Savoy, Massachusetts. Two people were killed.	
2011 Halloween nor'easter	October 28 – November 1, 2011	A rare, historic nor'easter, which produced record-breaking snowfall for October in many areas of the Northeastern U.S., especially New England. The storm produced a maximum of 32 inches (81 cm) of snow in Peru, Massachusetts, and killed 39 people. After the storm, the rest of the winter for New England remained very quiet, with much lower than average snowfall and no other significant storms striking the region for the rest of the season.	
November 2012 nor'easter	November 7–10, 2012	A moderately strong nor'easter that struck the same regions that were impacted by Hurricane Sandy a week earlier. The storm exacerbated the problems left behind by Sandy, knocking down trees that were weakened by Sandy. It also left several residents in the Northeast without power again after power had been restored following Hurricane Sandy. The highest snowfall total from the storm was 13 inches (33 cm), recorded in Clintonville, Connecticut.	
Late December 2012 North American storm complex	December 17–31, 2012	A major nor'easter that was known for its tornado outbreak across the Gulf Coast states on Christmas Day and giving areas such as northeastern Texas a white Christmas. The low underwent secondary cyclogenesis near the coast of North Carolina and dumped a swath of heavy snow across northern New England and New York, and caused blizzard conditions across the Ohio Valley, as well as an ice storm in the mountains of Virginia and West Virginia.	
Early February 2013 North American blizzard	February 7–18, 2013	An extremely powerful and historic nor'easter that dumped heavy snow and unleashed hurricane-force wind gusts across New England. Many areas received well over 2 feet (61 cm) of snow, especially Connecticut, Rhode Island, and eastern Massachusetts. The highest amount recorded was 40 inches (100 cm) in Hamden, Connecticut, and Gorham, Maine, received a record 35.5 inches (90 cm). Over 700,000 people were left without power and travel in the region came to a complete standstill. On the afternoon of February 9, when the storm was pulling away from the Northeastern United States, a well-defined eye could be seen in the center. The eye feature was no longer visible the next day and the storm quickly moved out to sea. The nor'easter later moved on to impact the United Kingdom before finally dissipating on February 20. The storm killed 18 people.	
March 2013 nor'easter	March 1–21, 2013	A large and powerful nor'easter that ended up stalling along the eastern seaboard due to a blocking ridge of high pressure in Newfoundland and pivoted back heavy snow and strong winds into the Northeast United States for a period of 2 to 3 days. Many officials and residents were caught off guard as local weather stations predicted only a few inches (several centimeters) of snow and a change over to mostly rain. Contrary to local forecasts, many areas received over one foot (30 cm) of snow, with the highest amount being 29 inches (74 cm) in Milton, Massachusetts. Several schools across the region, particularly in the Boston, Massachusetts, metropolitan area, remained in session during the height of the storm, not knowing the severity of the situation. Rough surf and rip currents were felt all the way southwards towards Florida's east coast.	
January 2015 North American blizzard	January 23–31, 2015	The blizzard began as an Alberta Clipper in the Midwestern states, which was forecast to transfer its energy to a new, secondary low pressure system off the coast of the Mid-Atlantic and move northeastward and pass to the south and east of New England. After moving into the sea, the storm began to slowly pull away to the northeast, a little quicker than expected. The storm brought over 20 inches (51 cm) of snow to much of the area, with several reports of over 30 inches (76 cm) across the state of Massachusetts, breaking many records. A maximum of 36 inches (91 cm) was recorded in at least four towns across Worcester County in Massachusetts and the city of Worcester itself received 34.5 inches (88 cm), marking the city's largest storm snowfall accumulation on record. Boston recorded 24.6 inches (62 cm), making it the largest storm snowfall accumulation during the month of January. On the coast of Massachusetts, hurricane-force gusts up to around 80 mph (130 km/h) along with sustained winds between 50 and 55 mph (80 and 89 km/h) at times, were reported. The storm also caused severe coastal flooding and storm surge.	
October 2015 North American storm complex	September 29 – October 2, 2015	In early October, a low pressure system formed in the Atlantic. Tapping into moisture from Hurricane Joaquin, the storm dumped a significant amount of rain, mostly in South Carolina.	
January 2016 United States blizzard (also known as Winter Storm Jonas, Snowzilla, or The Blizzard of 2016 by media outlets)	January 19–29, 2016	This system dumped 2 to 3 feet (61 to 91 cm) of snow in the East Coast of the United States. States of emergency were declared in 12 states and the city of Washington, D.C., in advance of the storm. The blizzard also caused significant storm surge in New Jersey and Delaware. Sustained damaging winds over 50 mph (80 km/h) were recorded in many coastal communities, with a maximum gust to 85 mph (137 km/h) reported on Assateague Island, Virginia. A total of 55 people died due to the storm.	
February 9–11, 2017 North American blizzard (also known as Winter Storm Niko by media outlets)	February 6–11, 2017	Forming as an Alberta clipper in the northern United States on February 6, the system initially produced light snowfall from the Midwest to the Ohio Valley as it tracked southeastwards. It eventually reached the East Coast of the United States on February 9 and began to rapidly grow into a powerful nor'easter, dumping 1 to 2 feet (30 to 61 cm) across the Northeast megalopolis. The storm also produced prolific thunder and lightning across Southern New England. Prior to the blizzard, unprecedented and record-breaking warmth had enveloped the region, with record highs of above 60 °F (16 °C) recorded in several areas, including Central Park in New York City. Some were caught off guard by the warmth and had little time to prepare for the snowstorm.	
February 12–14, 2017 North American blizzard	February 12–15, 2017		
March 2017 North American blizzard (also known as Winter Storm Stella, Blizzard Eugene, Blizzard of 2017, Pi Day Storm, and Pi Day Blizzard by media outlets)	March 12–15, 2017		
October 2017 North American storm complex	October 28–31, 2017	An extratropical storm absorbed the remnants of Tropical Storm Philippe. The combined systems became an extremely powerful nor'easter that wreaked havoc across the Northeastern United States and Eastern Canada. The storm produced sustained tropical storm force winds, along with hurricane-force gusts in many areas. The highest wind gusts recorded were 93 mph (150 km/h) in Popponesset, Massachusetts and Matinicus Isle, Maine. The storm caused over 1,400,000 power outages, with the worst occurring in Maine, where the vast majority of residents were in the dark immediately following the storm. Damage across New England was very extensive. This was due to the combination of the high winds, heavy rainfall, saturated ground, and most trees still being fully leaved. Autumn foliage in parts of northern New England was removed from the landscape in a matter of hours due to high winds. Some residents in Connecticut were also without power for nearly a week following the storm. Heavy rain in Quebec and Eastern Ontario, with up to 98 mm (3.9 in) in the Canadian capital region of Ottawa, greatly interfered with transportation.	
January 2018 North American blizzard	January 2–6, 2018	A powerful blizzard that caused severe disruption along the East Coast of the United States and Canada. It dumped snow and ice in places that rarely receive wintry precipitation, even in the winter, such as Florida and Georgia, and produced snowfall accumulations of over 2 feet (61 cm) in the Mid-Atlantic states, New England, and Atlantic Canada. The storm originated on January 3 as an area of low pressure off the coast of the Southeast. Moving swiftly to the northeast, the storm explosively deepened while moving parallel to the Eastern Seaboard, causing significant snowfall accumulations. The storm received various unofficial names, such as Winter Storm Grayson, Blizzard of 2018 and Storm Brody. The storm was also dubbed a "historic bomb cyclone", with a minimum central pressure of 948 mb (28.0 inHg), similar to that of a Category 3 or 4 hurricane	
March 1-3, 2018 nor'easter (also known as Winter Storm Riley by media outlets)	March 1–5, 2018	A very powerful nor'easter that caused major impacts in the Northeastern, Mid-Atlantic and Southeastern United States. It originated as the northernmost low of a stationary front over the Midwest on March 1, which moved eastward into the Northeast later that night. A new low pressure system rapidly formed off the coast on March 2 as it slowly meandered near the coastline. It peaked later that day and began to gradually move out to sea by March 3. Producing over 2 feet (24 in) of snow in some areas, it was one of the most significant March snowstorms in many areas, particularly in Upstate New York. In other areas, it challenged storm surge records set by other significant storms, such as Hurricane Sandy. It also produced widespread damaging winds, with gusts well over Hurricane force strength in some areas across Eastern New England as well as on the back side in the Mid-Atlantic via a sting jet. Over 2.2 million customers were left without power.	
March 6-8, 2018 nor'easter (also known as Winter Storm Quinn by media outlets)	March 2–9, 2018	A powerful nor'easter that affected the Northeast United States. It came just days after another nor'easter devastated much of the Northeast. Frequent cloud to ground Thundersnow as well as snowfall rates of up to 3 inches (7.6 cm) an hour were reported in areas around the Tri-State Area, signaling the rapid intensification of the storm. Late in the afternoon, an eye-like feature was spotted near the center of the storm. It dumped over 2 feet (0.61 m) of snow in many areas across the Northeast, including many areas in New England where the predominant precipitation type was rain for the previous storm. Over 1 million power outages were reported at the height of the storm due to the weight of the heavy, wet snow on trees and power lines. Many people who lost power in the previous storm found themselves in the dark again.	
March 12–14, 2018 nor'easter (also known as Winter Storm Skylar by media outlets)	March 11–14, 2018	A powerful nor'easter that affected portions of the Northeast United States. The storm underwent rapid intensification with a central millibaric pressure dropping down from 1,001 mb (29.6 inHg) to 974 mb (28.8 inHg) in just 24 hours. This was the third major storm to strike the area within a period of 11 days. The storm dumped over up 2 feet (0.67 yd) of snow and brought Hurricane-force wind gusts to portions of Eastern New England. Hundreds of public school districts including, Boston, Hartford, and Providence were closed on Tuesday, March 13.	
March 20–22, 2018 nor'easter (also known as Winter Storm Toby and Four'Easter by media outlets)	March 20–22, 2018	A powerful nor'easter that became the fourth major nor'easter to affect the Northeast United States in a period of less than three weeks. It caused a severe weather outbreak over the Southern United States on March 19 before moving off of the North Carolina coast on March 20 and spreading freezing rain and snow into the Mid-Atlantic States after shortly dissipating later that night. A new low pressure center then formed off of Chesapeake Bay on March 21 and then became the primary nor'easter. Dry air prevented most of the precipitation from reaching the ground in areas in New England such as Boston, Hartford, and Providence, all of which received little to no accumulation, in contrast with what local forecasts had originally predicted. In Islip, New York at the height of the storm, snowfall rates of up to 5 inches (13 cm) per hour were reported. 8 inches (20 cm) was reported at Central Park and over 12 inches (30 cm) was reported in many locations on Long Island as well in and around New York City and in parts of New Jersey. Over 100,000 customers lost power at the peak of the storm, mostly due to the weight of the heavy, wet snow on trees and power lines, with a majority of the outages being in New Jersey.	
Early December 2020 nor'easter	December 4–6, 2020	It brought up to 18 inches (46 cm) of snow in northern New England.	
Mid-December 2020 nor'easter	December 14–19, 2020	The nor'easter brought significant snowfall to metropolitan areas such as New York City, Philadelphia, and Washington, D.C., which eclipsed the entire snowfall total from the previous winter season, as well as Boston and Portland that saw over a foot of snow from the storm. It killed at least 7 people.	
January 31 – February 3, 2021 nor'easter	January 31 – February 3, 2021	The Groundhog Day Nor'easter of 2021 was a powerful Nor'easter that impacted the Northeastern United States and Eastern Canada. Large metropolitan areas such as New York City saw as much as 18–24 inches (46–61 cm) of snow accumulations from January 31 to February 2.	
April 2021 nor'easter (Also known as 2021 Spring nor'easter by media outlets)	April 15–17, 2021		
Late October 2021 Nor'easter	October 25–28, 2021	A powerful early-season nor'easter that struck the Northeastern United States in late October 2021. The system subsequently moved out to sea and later became Tropical Storm Wanda. Over 607,000 customers lost power during the storm, with the majority of them in Massachusetts. The Nor'easter fell as high as 5 inches of rain in Hunter, New York.	
April 2022 Nor'easter	April 18–20, 2022	Beginning early on April 18, a nor'easter began developing off the Southeastern United States, bringing heavy rain, wind, heavy snow, and coastal flooding to much of the Mid-Atlantic states. Further inland in areas like Pennsylvania, Upstate New York and New England, heavy snowfall fell as high as 6–12 inches (15–30 cm). Over 300,000 customers in the Northeast lost power, including 200,000 in New York. Virgil, New York saw 18 inches (46 cm) of snow, while Montrose, Pennsylvania saw 14.5 inches (37 cm) of snow.	
March 2023 nor'easter	March 13–15, 2023	Beginning on March 13, a nor'easter brought heavy snow to Northern New England and Upstate New York, with up to 40 inches (100 cm) in isolated spots. The nor'easter brought very little snow to the coast.	
October 2025 nor'easter	October 9-12, 2025	Beginning on October 9th, a nor'easter brought heavy rain and strong winds to New York City Significant coastal flooding hit the Jersey Shore, with tides reaching major flood stage in Barnegat Bay. Strong winds gusted up to 60 mph (88 ft/s) in Surf City on Sunday night, and flooding in coastal towns like Avalon and Manasquan was reported. The nor'easter brought heavy rain, strong winds, and minor to moderate coastal flooding in New England with the highest winds recorded on Cape Cod and the islands. Coastal flooding was reported from South Carolina up to Delaware, which prompted authorities to activate the Delaware National Guard.	
January 2026 nor'easter	January 30, 2026 - February 4 2026		
February 2026 nor'easter (also known as Winter Storm Hernando by media outlets)	February 22-24, 2026		
September 2026 nor'easter	September 24-28, 2026	Taking place very early in the season; only nor'easter listed to take place entirely in September.	Storm

== See also ==
- Nor'wester
- Black nor'easter
- Alberta clipper
- Cold-core low
- Panhandle hook
- Sudestada
- Winter storm
- Pacific Northwest windstorm
- Aleutian low
- European windstorm
- Polar vortex
- Cold wave
- Euroclydon

Similar only in name:

- Sou'wester – A rain hat
