= March 20–22, 2018 nor'easter =

Cyclone

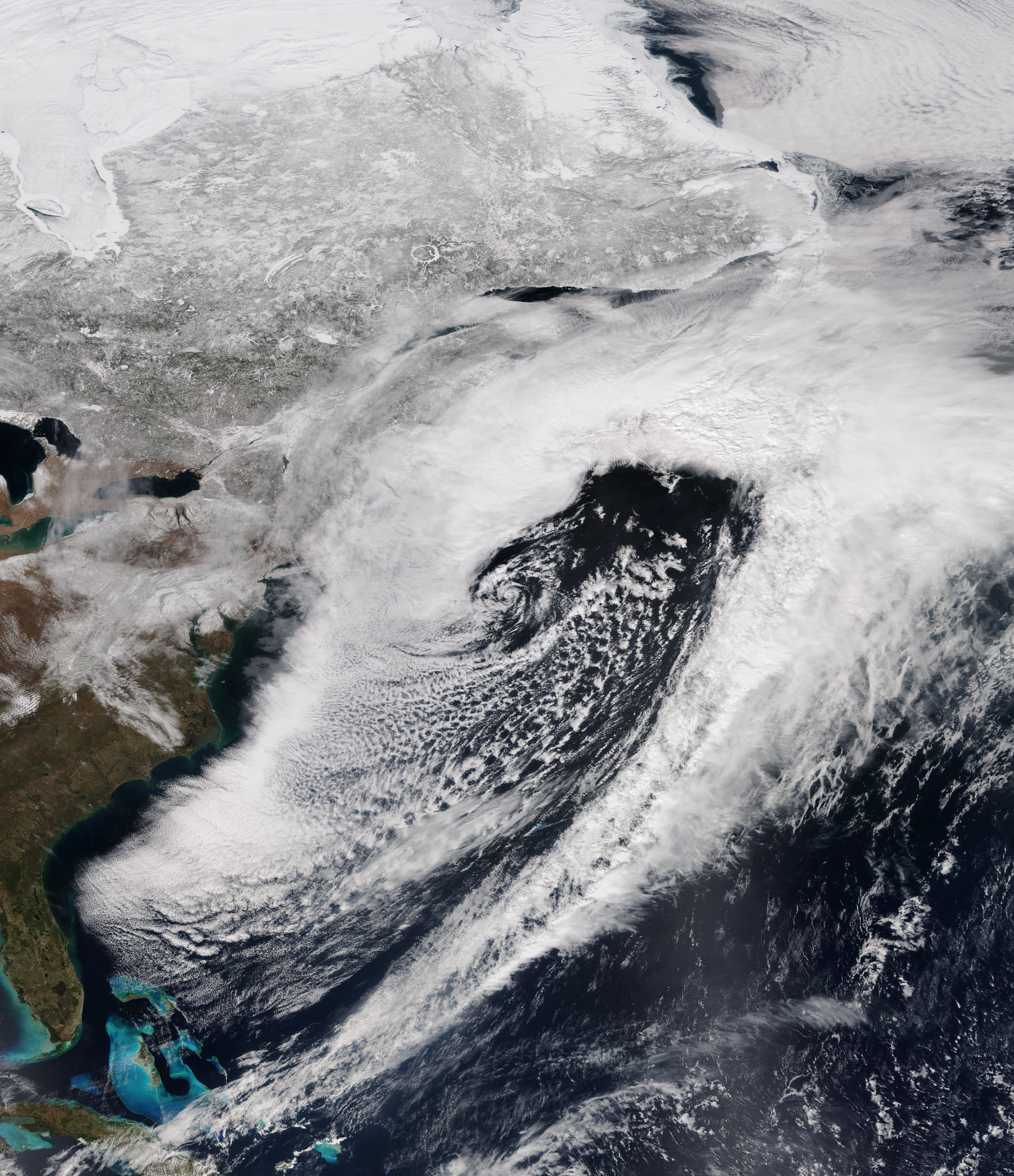
- A Suomi NPP satellite image of the nor'easter at peak intensity off the Northeast U.S. on March 22, 2018

Meteorological history
- Formed: March 18, 2018
- Exited land: March 22, 2018
- Dissipated: March 24, 2018

Category 1 "Notable" winter storm
- Regional snowfall index: 1.60 (NOAA)
- Highest gusts: 79 mph (127 km/h) near Topsfield, Massachusetts
- Lowest pressure: 988 mbar (hPa); 29.18 inHg
- Max. snowfall: Snowfall – 20.1 in (51 cm) in Patchogue, New York; Ice – 0.20 in (5.1 mm) in Townsend, Delaware

Tornado outbreak
- Tornadoes: 20
- Max. rating: EF3 tornado
- Duration: 6 hours, 19 minutes
- Largest hail: 5.38 inches (13.7 cm) in Alabama

Overall effects
- Fatalities: 4 total
- Damage: $900 million (2018 USD)
- Areas affected: Midwestern United States, Southeast and Northeast
- Power outages: > 100,000
- Part of the 2017–18 North American winter and tornado outbreaks of 2018

The March 20–22, 2018 nor'easter, dubbed the "Four'easter" in some media outlets, brought additional significant late-season snowfall to the Northeastern United States, after three previous such nor'easters had struck the general region on March 1–3, 6–8, and 12–15, respectively. affected the Mid-Atlantic states and New England with over 18 in (46 cm) of heavy snow and whiteout conditions. It also affected areas of the Southeastern and Midwestern United States with both snowfall and severe weather. The nor'easter was also one of the heaviest spring snowstorms on record in some areas in the Mid-Atlantic, especially Philadelphia and New York City.

Originating from a surface low that formed over the Rocky Mountains, the system tracked across the central United States, bringing some wintry weather to surrounding areas as well as severe weather in the South. It then reached the Northeastern U.S. on March 20–21 and, while moving slowly near the shorelines of Delaware, New Jersey, and Long Island, dropped heavy snowfall with rates of up to 5 inches (13 cm) an hour in some spots. The storm was given unofficial names such as Winter Storm Toby and Nor'easter 4.

The storm caused hundreds of flights to be cancelled in advance, and caused many school districts to close for the following day or two. Over 100,000 power outages were reported as a result of the nor'easter. At least 3 people have been killed in the nor'easter as of March 21. In addition, the system produced a tornado outbreak in the Southeast, spawning at least 20 tornadoes on March 19, one of which was a long-tracked EF3 that hit Jacksonville, Alabama causing considerable damage.

== Meteorological history ==
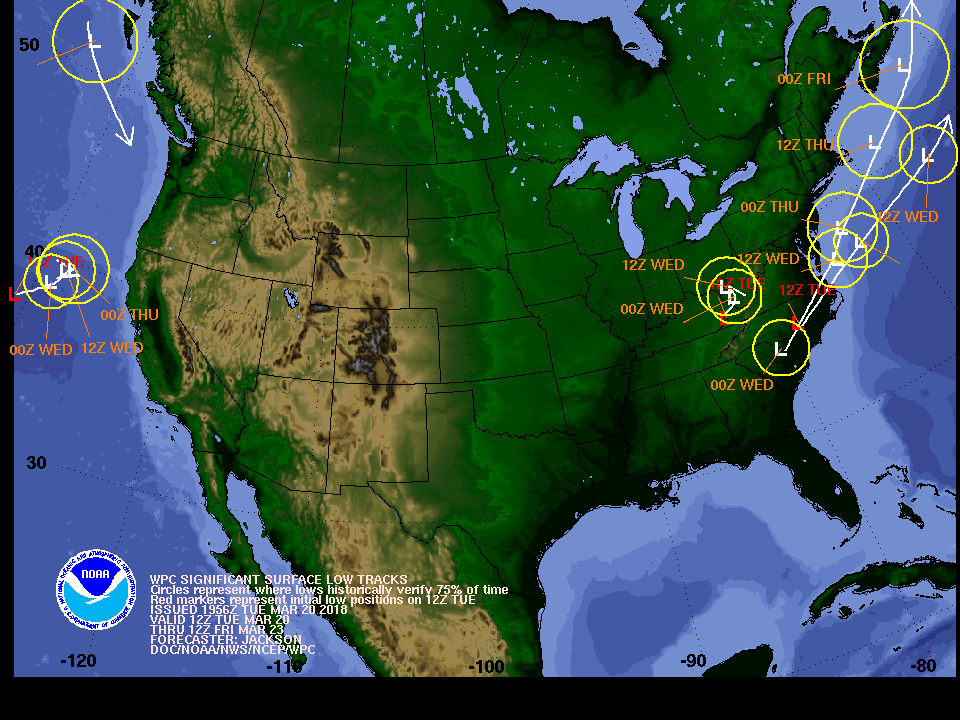
Weather Prediction Center (WPC) graphic showing the track of the low-pressure associated with the storm

On March 18, an area of low pressure consolidated over the Rocky Mountains, bringing moderate to heavy snow to those locations. Over the next day or two, this low slowly moved eastward across the Central United States, while also interacting with a stationary front located in the Southeast. This ultimately resulted in a severe weather outbreak in the South late on March 19, producing at least nineteen confirmed tornadoes, one of which was rated an EF3. As the system moved eastwards towards the Eastern United States, it was still somewhat uncertain how much snow the storm would produce, which depended on its track and intensity; as the impending storm grew closer it became increasingly likely a major snowstorm would occur. Precipitation began to spread into the Mid-Atlantic states by early March 20. This first phase of the nor'easter brought freezing rain and snow to much of the Tri-State area, before it began dissipating later that night while snow continued over the Appalachian Mountains from an associated but weakening low. At the same time, a new surface low formed off the Chesapeake Bay around 03:00 UTC on March 21, prompting the Weather Prediction Center (WPC) to begin issuing storm summaries on the developing nor'easter.

After forming, the storm began intensifying as it slowly moved northward parallel to the East Coast, with a large swath of moderate to heavy snow covering the area of New Jersey and Long Island in the morning hours of March 21. Contrary to the previous nor'easters, there was colder air further south then in other storms, which allowed accumulating snow to stick more quickly in areas near southern New Jersey throughout the day. Due to moving slowly near the coast, bands of heavy snowfall (with some embedded rates of up to 4 inches (10 cm) per hour) hammered the coastline as it continued to slowly move eastward. By the following day, the system attained a minimum pressure of around 988 mbar (29.2 inHg). Shortly afterwards however, at 15:00 UTC, the WPC terminated storm summaries on the nor'easter as most of the snow in New England had tapered off.

== Preparations and impact ==
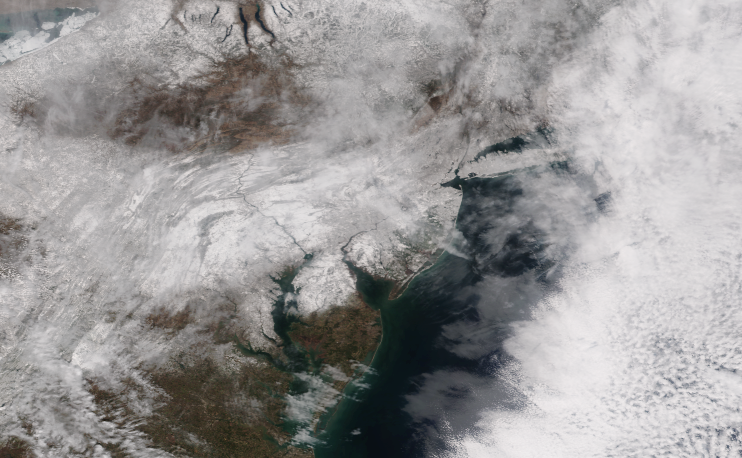
Satellite shot of the snow cover in the Northeast after the nor'easter subsided on March 22.

=== Mid-Atlantic regions ===
Having been affected by three previous nor'easters in the month of March, the impending storm caused intense preparation across the region. In the early morning hours of March 20, several hundred flights were either canceled or rerouted ahead of the storm. More than 4,000 flights were canceled on March 21, mainly because of the nor'easter. Amtrak modified or canceled service on several trains running along the Northeast Corridor on March 21 and 22 due to the nor'easter. Over 100,000 people lost power from the nor'easter.

==== Virginia and Maryland ====
In Virginia, state offices in Richmond opened two hours late on March 21. The Virginia State Police responded to more than 250 crashes on the morning of March 21. Virginia Railway Express suspended service on March 21 due to the snow.

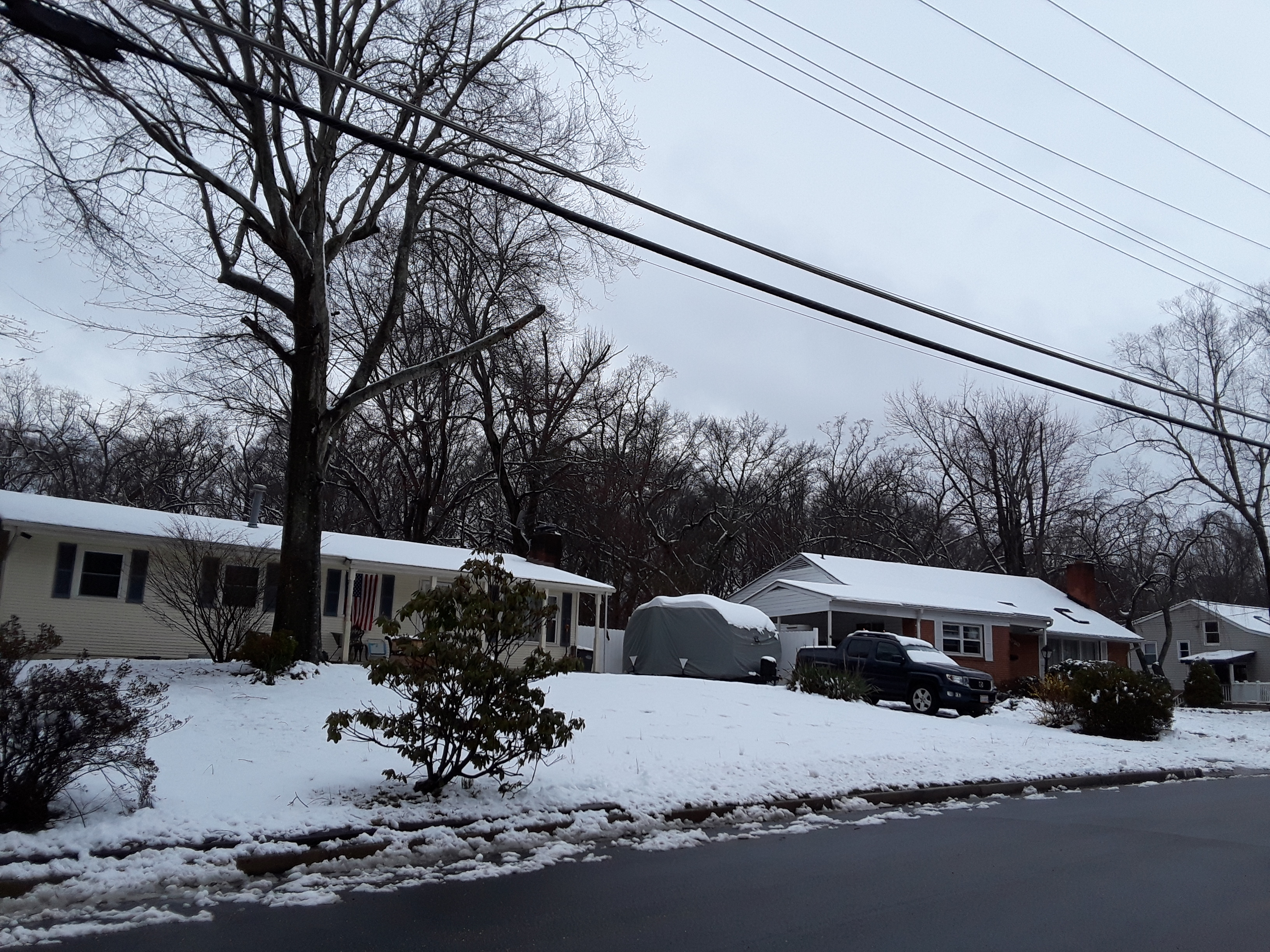
Houses in southern Fairfax County late in the afternoon of March 21.

All federal offices in Washington, D.C. were closed on March 21 due to the nor'easter. Schools across the Washington, D.C. area were closed. The Washington Metro saw lower ridership while bus service on Metrobus and suburban bus systems was reduced due to the nor'easter.

In Maryland, the nor'easter brought heavy snow to areas that very rarely receive heavy snowfall so late in the month. Schools in Baltimore were closed on March 21 due to the nor'easter. MARC Train and MTA commuter bus service were both suspended on March 21. Several accidents were reported across the state due to the snow. A school bus driver in Frederick County had to be removed after the bus slid off a roadway due to wintry conditions. No one was injured in the incident.

==== Delaware ====
In Delaware, Governor John Carney declared a state of emergency starting at midnight on March 21. State offices in New Castle County were closed on March 21. Governor Carney issued a Level 1 driving warning in New Castle and Kent counties effective at 2:45 p.m. on March 21, encouraging motorists not to be out on the roads. DART First State suspended bus service in New Castle and Kent counties at 6 p.m. on March 21. The nor'easter caused flooding along River Road in Oak Orchard. Coastal flooding brought waves to the dunes in Rehoboth Beach and onshore at the Indian River Inlet Bridge, causing moderate beach erosion. A walkway leading to the beach in Bethany Beach was washed away by high tide.

==== Pennsylvania ====
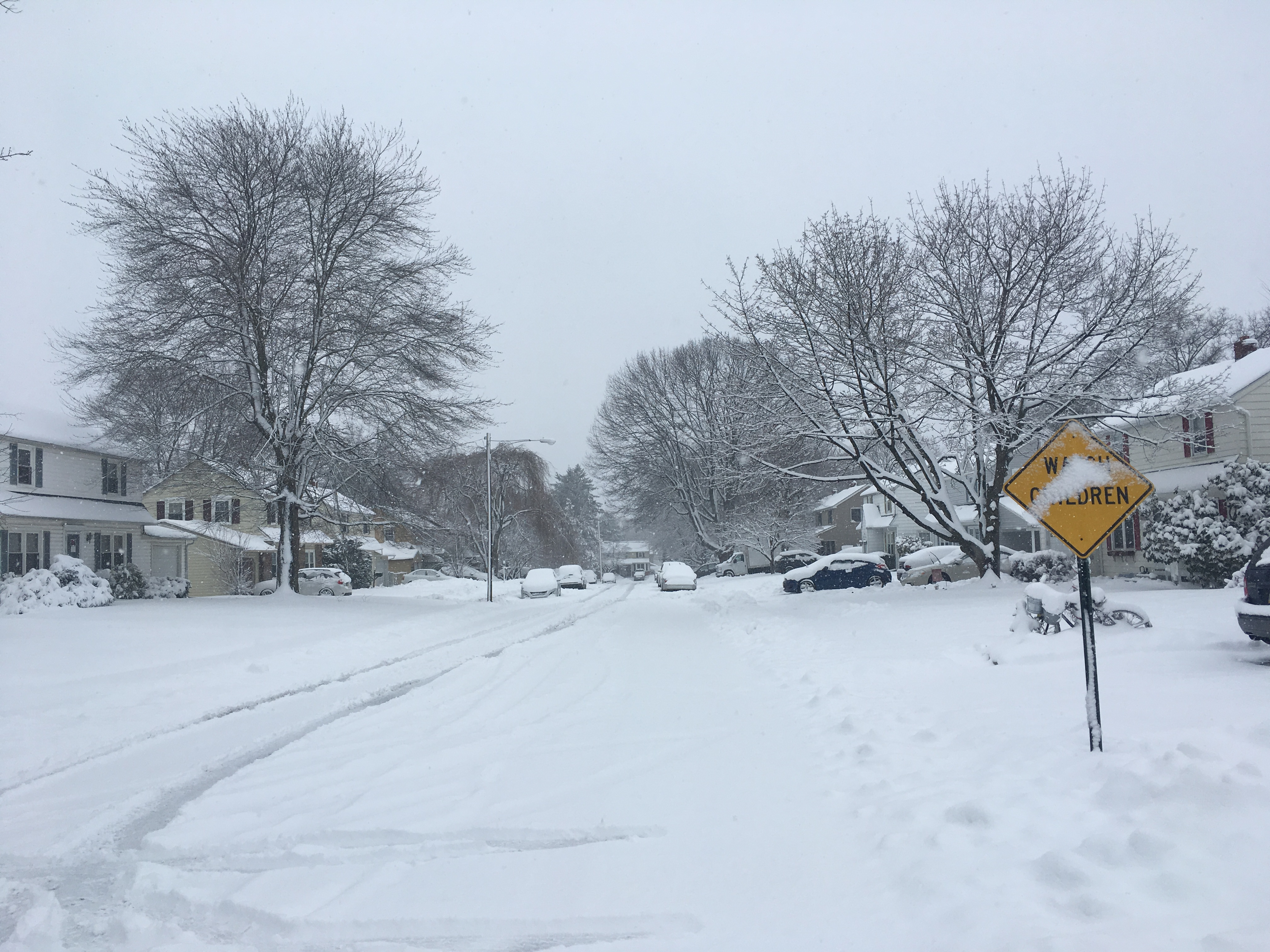
Snow from the nor'easter in Hatboro, Pennsylvania

In Pennsylvania, Governor Tom Wolf put over 450 Pennsylvania National Guard soldiers on standby. In Philadelphia, a snow emergency was declared for March 21, with schools and government offices shut down. SEPTA modified their service plan for March 21 due to the snow, with Regional Rail trains running on a modified Saturday schedule and Broad Street Line and Market–Frankford Line trains running during the overnight hours. In addition, several SEPTA bus routes were placed on detours in advance of the storm. PennDOT reported that it had around 400 snow trucks and over 70,000 pounds of salt ready to clear roadways during the storm. Authorities from the Pennsylvania Turnpike Commission announced that the speed limit would be reduced to 45 mph (72 km/h) on the entire length of the Pennsylvania Turnpike and the Northeast Extension, with a truck and trailer ban enacted for the entire turnpike starting at 8 p.m on March 20. PennDOT also lowered the speed limit to 45 mph (72 km/h) on several freeways in the southeastern part of the state and implemented truck and trailer bans on select freeways in the eastern part of the state. A crash involving two tractor-trailers shut down the westbound Pennsylvania Turnpike west of Reading. Two police officers were taken to the hospital following a crash on Interstate 95 in Philadelphia during the storm. Two people were killed in a crash in Horsham on March 20 when their car slid on ice and hit another car head on. The bus carrying the Villanova Wildcats men's basketball team to the airport for a charter flight to Boston for their NCAA tournament Sweet 16 game got stuck in the snow trying to leave the campus and took ten attempts to get freed.

In the Lehigh Valley region of eastern Pennsylvania, LANta buses operated on snow emergency detours, with service suspended at 4 p.m. on March 21. In Berks County, BARTA suspended bus service starting at 5 p.m. on March 21. Bieber Tourways canceled most of its buses between the Reading and Lehigh Valley areas and Philadelphia and New York City on March 21. The cities of Allentown and Reading opened downtown parking garages to residents to park for free.

==== New Jersey ====
In New Jersey, Governor Phil Murphy declared a state of emergency beginning at 7 p.m. on March 20. All state offices in New Jersey were closed on March 21. On March 20, the Wave Parking Garage in Atlantic City offered to allow residents to park for free during the nor'easter. Rutgers University announced that all classes would be cancelled on March 21, due to the nor'easter. New Jersey Transit suspended bus service starting at 3 p.m. on March 21 due to the storm, while train service ran on a limited weekday schedule. The New Jersey State Police banned commercial vehicles along Interstate 78, Interstate 80, Interstate 280, and Interstate 287. One person was in intensive care following an accident along Interstate 78 in Hunterdon County. An 87-year-old woman with dementia and Alzheimer's was found dead in the snow in Toms River. Demi Lovato was forced to reschedule a concert in Newark due to the snowstorm, the new date of Lovato's concert will be April 2. The nor'easter caused beach erosion at the Jersey Shore, including Brigantine and Ocean City, which had just seen beach replenishment. Street flooding occurred in Ocean City from the nor'easter.

==== New York and Rhode Island ====
In New York, Governor Andrew Cuomo declared a state of emergency for New York City, Long Island, and Westchester, Rockland, and Putnam counties. Schools in New York City were closed on March 21 due to the nor'easter and the city issued a Snow Alert. 12–18 inches (30–46 cm) of snow fell across the region, with New York City itself seeing 8.4 inches (21 cm). Governor Cuomo issued a travel ban for tractor-trailers along several Interstate highways in the New York City area. The nor'easter forced the modification of service along the New York City Subway. The Metro-North Railroad operated on a reduced weekday schedule. Justin Timberlake was forced to cancel a concert at Madison Square Garden on March 21, to be rescheduled on a later date. A van flipped over on the Wantagh State Parkway in Nassau County from the snow, killing one person and injuring five other people. A 62-year-old woman in Bellmore died of a heart attack while shoveling snow. The nor'easter caused several accidents on Long Island, including an accident between two tractor-trailers on the Long Island Expressway in North Hills. Combined with many other nor’easters earlier in the month, the snow from this storm resulted in March 2018 becoming the snowiest March on record in Islip, New York.

Governor Gina Raimondo of Rhode Island announced that all state services would be closed on March 21 due to the storm. Schools in Providence were closed on March 21.

=== Other regions ===
Winter weather advisories and winter storm watches and warnings were issued in parts of the Tennessee and Ohio valleys, as snow was expected to accumulate and blanket parts of Ohio, Indiana and Kentucky - and as far south as the Great Smoky Mountains of Tennessee and North Carolina and into central Appalachia.

== Tornado outbreak ==
| EFU | EF0 | EF1 | EF2 | EF3 | EF4 | EF5 |
|---|---|---|---|---|---|---|
| 0 | 7 | 10 | 4 | 1 | 0 | 0 |

Before impacting the Northeast, the system was also responsible for producing severe weather across the South on March 19–20, with at least twenty tornadoes being confirmed by the National Weather Service (NWS). One possible tornado late on March 19 was reported as having caused "unbelievable destruction" in the town of Fulton, Alabama. Another devastating tornado, the first to be rated EF3 of the year, hit Jacksonville, Alabama, which caused extensive damage to both the city and to Jacksonville State University (although many of its students were on spring break at the time). That EF3 tornado ended a record 306 day drought without any EF3 tornadoes in the United States. In addition to tornadoes, the largest hail stone in Alabama history fell, at 5.38 inches (13.7 cm) in diameter.

=== March 18 event ===
List of confirmed tornadoes – Sunday, March 18, 2018 (Note: All dates are based on the local time zone where the tornado touched down; however, all times are in Coordinated Universal Time for consistency.)
| EF# | Location | County / Parish | State | Start Coord. | Time (UTC) | Path length | Max width |
|---|---|---|---|---|---|---|---|
| EF0 | S of Spearman | Hansford | TX | 36.13°N 101.19°W | 00:29–00:34 | 0.06 mi (0.097 km) | 25 yd (23 m) |
| EF0 | A landspout tornado was photographed multiple times. | | | | | | |
| EF1 | N of Glazier | Hemphill | TX | 36.0248°N 100.2995°W | 02:14–02:24 | 6.03 mi (9.70 km) | 70 yd (64 m) |
| EF1 | A tornado caused damage to trees, powerlines, and an outbuilding. | | | | | | |

=== March 19 event ===
List of confirmed tornadoes – Monday, March 19, 2018
| EF# | Location | County / Parish | State | Start Coord. | Time (UTC) | Path length | Max width |
|---|---|---|---|---|---|---|---|
| EF0 | E of Belmont | Tishomingo | MS | 34.5051°N 88.2099°W | 21:53–21:54 | 0.82 mi (1.32 km) | 125 yd (114 m) |
| EF0 | A home and two apartments suffered minor roof damage. Several large trees were uprooted, and a fence was blown over. | | | | | | |
| EF0 | S of Cherokee | Colbert | AL | 34.6291°N 87.9681°W | 22:05–22:15 | 3.9 mi (6.3 km) | 120 yd (110 m) |
| EF0 | Several large trees were snapped or uprooted. | | | | | | |
| EF1 | W of Russellville | Franklin | AL | 34.5107°N 87.8727°W | 22:10–22:16 | 1.21 mi (1.95 km) | 100 yd (91 m) |
| EF1 | Brief tornado near Cedar Creek Lake caused roof, window, and siding damage to a mobile home and three frame homes. A barn and a covered boat slip were destroyed, and many trees were knocked down along the path. | | | | | | |
| EF1 | Southern Russellville | Franklin | AL | 34.4988°N 87.7476°W | 22:21–22:30 | 2.05 mi (3.30 km) | 200 yd (180 m) |
| EF1 | Numerous homes in the southern part of Russellville sustained varying degrees of roof and siding damage as a result of this rain-wrapped tornado, with one house also losing its chimney. In addition, a barn was destroyed, a Waffle House sustained roof and sign damage, and a metal warehouse building and apartment complex sustained minor structural damage. Numerous trees were downed as well. | | | | | | |
| EF0 | Mount Hope | Lawrence | AL | 34.4535°N 87.4978°W | 22:54–22:56 | 1.16 mi (1.87 km) | 250 yd (230 m) |
| EF0 | On a farm, several small fertilizer containers were blown over; one was tossed over 1,000 yd (910 m). At Mount Hope School, bleachers were dragged and sustained minor damage. Trees were uprooted and branches were snapped along the path. | | | | | | |
| EF2 | SW of Lester to ESE of Ardmore | Limestone | AL | 34.9572°N 87.2049°W | 23:08–23:46 | 23.54 mi (37.88 km) | 600 yd (550 m) |
| EF2 | Multiple-vortex tornado moved through areas just south of the Tennessee state line, causing heavy roof damage to numerous site-built homes and manufactured homes, two of which lost most of their roofs and roofing structures. Several small sheds and barns were damaged or destroyed, and hundreds of trees were downed along the path. | | | | | | |
| EF1 | W of Aldridge Grove to E of Speake | Lawrence | AL | 34.4235°N 87.2526°W | 23:16–23:22 | 6.8 mi (10.9 km) | 100 yd (91 m) |
| EF1 | In the Aldridge Grove area, numerous trees were snapped and a church sustained roof damage. Additional trees were snapped and minor structural damage occurred in small community of Speake before the tornado dissipated. | | | | | | |
| EF1 | SW of Hartselle to SE of Falkville | Morgan, Cullman | AL | 34.3675°N 87.0404°W | 23:29–23:54 | 14 mi (23 km) | 550 yd (500 m) |
| EF1 | A few small farm buildings and sheds were either heavily damaged or destroyed, and many trees were downed. | | | | | | |
| EF1 | SE of Francisco | Jackson | AL | 34.9682°N 86.2307°W | 23:30–23:36 | 0.53 mi (0.85 km) | 200 yd (180 m) |
| EF1 | An extensive swath of trees was downed or uprooted. | | | | | | |
| EF1 | NW of Hazel Green | Madison | AL | 34.9631°N 86.6509°W | 23:58–00:04 | 4.8 mi (7.7 km) | 150 yd (140 m) |
| EF1 | Rain-wrapped tornado hit a building supply yard, removing metal roofing and siding from a building, leaving the wooden support structure broken and scattering the roofing into a nearby field. Additionally, a house had about a quarter of its shingles removed and a few sheds and farm outbuildings were heavily damaged. More homes sustained roof damage, either directly from winds or by falling trees. | | | | | | |
| EF0 | N of Summit | Blount | AL | 34.2299°N 86.4949°W | 00:09–00:11 | 0.94 mi (1.51 km) | 100 yd (91 m) |
| EF0 | Sections of metal roofing were blown off four chicken houses. Some small trees were snapped and branches were broken. | | | | | | |
| EF2 | NNE of Douglas to SSW of Albertville | Marshall | AL | 34.2216°N 86.2939°W | 00:26–00:41 | 3.76 mi (6.05 km) | 690 yd (630 m) |
| EF2 | Low-end EF2 tornado destroyed a barn and two sets of chicken houses, and also damaged a third set of chicken houses and another farm building. Many trees were downed along the path. | | | | | | |
| EF0 | NE of Decherd | Franklin | TN | 35.2257°N 86.0669°W | 00:50–00:55 | 3.68 mi (5.92 km) | 150 yd (140 m) |
| EF0 | A few trees were slightly uprooted or had their branches snapped. | | | | | | |
| EF1 | NW of Ashville | Blount, St. Clair | AL | 33.8515°N 86.4152°W | 00:52–00:56 | 6.38 mi (10.27 km) | 880 yd (800 m) |
| EF1 | Dozens of trees were downed, many of which fell on structures and power lines. A house had a small part of its roof torn off as well. | | | | | | |
| EF2 | NE of Ashville to NE of Ohatchee | St. Clair, Etowah, Calhoun | AL | 33.8552°N 86.2398°W | 01:02–01:23 | 15.68 mi (25.23 km) | 2,000 yd (1,800 m) |
| EF2 | A high-end EF2 wedge tornado moved a home off of its foundation and completely removed its roof. Several other homes suffered roof and exterior wall loss near Southside. Numerous trees were snapped off near their bases, some of which fell on and damaged structures. One person was injured. | | | | | | |
| EF1 | SE of Centre | Cherokee | AL | 34.1095°N 85.6522°W | 01:20–01:22 | 1.07 mi (1.72 km) | 400 yd (370 m) |
| EF1 | A home sustained damage to its garage door. Several pine trees were snapped. Several apartment buildings lost their shingles, and a farm outbuilding was completely destroyed, with its metal panels scattered 300 yd (270 m) away. | | | | | | |
| EF3 | NW of Wellington, AL to Jacksonville, AL to NW of Bremen, GA | Calhoun (AL), Cleburne (AL), Haralson (GA) | AL, GA | 33.8453°N 85.9472°W | 01:23–02:14 | 34.99 mi (56.31 km) | 2,175 yd (1,989 m) |
| EF3 | Near Wellington, a few homes were damaged and a metal truss tower was downed by this destructive, long-tracked wedge tornado. The tornado then caused major structural damage to several homes and destroyed the sanctuary of a large brick church building before entering Jacksonville and striking Jacksonville State University. The Pete Mathews Coliseum lost much of its roof, light poles were downed at the baseball field, and large brick structures on campus had their roofs torn off. Several apartment complexes near the campus sustained EF3 damage, with buildings sustaining partial to total destruction of their top floors. Numerous vehicles were thrown from parking lots and damaged, a convenience store was badly damaged, and a Dollar General sustained roof loss and partial collapse of its front exterior wall. Homes in residential areas were also damaged, some of which lost their roofs. Past Jacksonville, the tornado reached its maximum intensity, snapping hundreds of trees and causing major damage to homes and mobile homes on Choccolocco Mountain and in Nances Creek. One home in this area was left with only one wall standing, and large hay bales were thrown 300 yards. Farther along the path, the tornado passed near Fruithurst and Muscadine before crossing into Georgia and dissipating near Bremen. Damage along this final segment of the path was limited to downed trees, some of which landed on structures. Four people were injured. | | | | | | |
| EF0 | W of Weaver | Calhoun | AL | 33.7502°N 85.8464°W | 02:07–02:10 | 0.82 mi (1.32 km) | 138 yd (126 m) |
| EF0 | On the north side of Finks Lake, one home sustained notable roof damage while a second had a few shingles ripped off. Passing across the lake, a small boat dock had a portion of its roof peeled back, a camper was flipped, and a horse trailer was blown onto its side. Trees were snapped or uprooted. | | | | | | |
| EF1 | Western Buchanan | Haralson | GA | 33.8115°N 85.1924°W | 02:25–02:27 | 1.39 mi (2.24 km) | 500 yd (460 m) |
| EF1 | Numerous large trees were snapped or uprooted in the western part of town, one of which fell on a home and caused serious injuries to two occupants. | | | | | | |
| EF2 | NW of Fairburn | Fulton | GA | 33.6226°N 84.6252°W | 03:11–03:14 | 0.53 mi (0.85 km) | 315 yd (288 m) |
| EF2 | Brief but strong tornado struck the Chestnut Ridge subdivision in South Fulton. At least 50 homes were damaged at this location, about half of which sustained significant damage. In one area, several homes had large sections of their roofs and second floor exterior walls removed. Outside the subdivision, a few other homes had roof and siding damage, and large trees were snapped and uprooted. | | | | | | |

== Naming ==
The storm has received several different unofficial names from different media outlets. The Weather Channel, which names significant winter storms that have disruptive impacts on major cities, assigned the name Toby to the winter storm. On social media, Reuters and several other news outlets referred to the storm as the "Four'easter" or "Nor'easter 4" (signifying it was the fourth such storm to impact the Northeastern U.S. in the month of March). The National Weather Service has stated though that, unlike hurricanes, it does not name winter storms. The practice of winter storm naming remains controversial in the United States.

== See also ==
- January 2016 United States blizzard
- March 2017 North American blizzard
