= Nor'wester =

Nor'wester may refer to:

- Nor'wester (New Zealand), a New Zealand wind pattern
- Nor'westers, a stormy weather pattern in India and Bangladesh occurring in summer
- Nor'Wester Mountains, a group of mountains in Ontario, Canada
- Nor'wester, a novel by Clements Ripley
- The Nor'-westers, a 1954 book by Ion Idriess
- Daily Nor'Wester, original name of the Winnipeg Telegram
- Employees of the North West Company during the North American fur trade

== See also ==
- Norwest (disambiguation)
