= Norwest =

Norwest may refer to:

== Businesses and organizations ==
- Norwest Corporation, a bank based in Minneapolis, Minnesota that operated from 1929 to 1998
- Norwest United, an Association Football Club in Auckland, New Zealand
- Norwest Venture Partners, an investment firm based in Palo Alto, California
- Rochdale Society of Equitable Pioneers, a co-operative that traded as Norwest from 1982 to 1991
- Vinci SA, parent company of Norwest Holst

== Places ==
- Norwest, New South Wales, a suburb of Sydney, Australia
- Norwest Business Park, in Norwest, New South Wales
- Norwest railway station, in Norwest, New South Wales
- Wells Fargo Arena (Tempe, Arizona), formerly Norwest Arena
- Wells Fargo Center (Minneapolis), formerly the Norwest Center

== Other uses ==
- Henry Norwest (1884–1918), Canadian soldier
- HMS Sealark (1903), a steam yacht renamed the Norwest
