= March 1–3, 2018 nor'easter =

Storm on the North American East coast

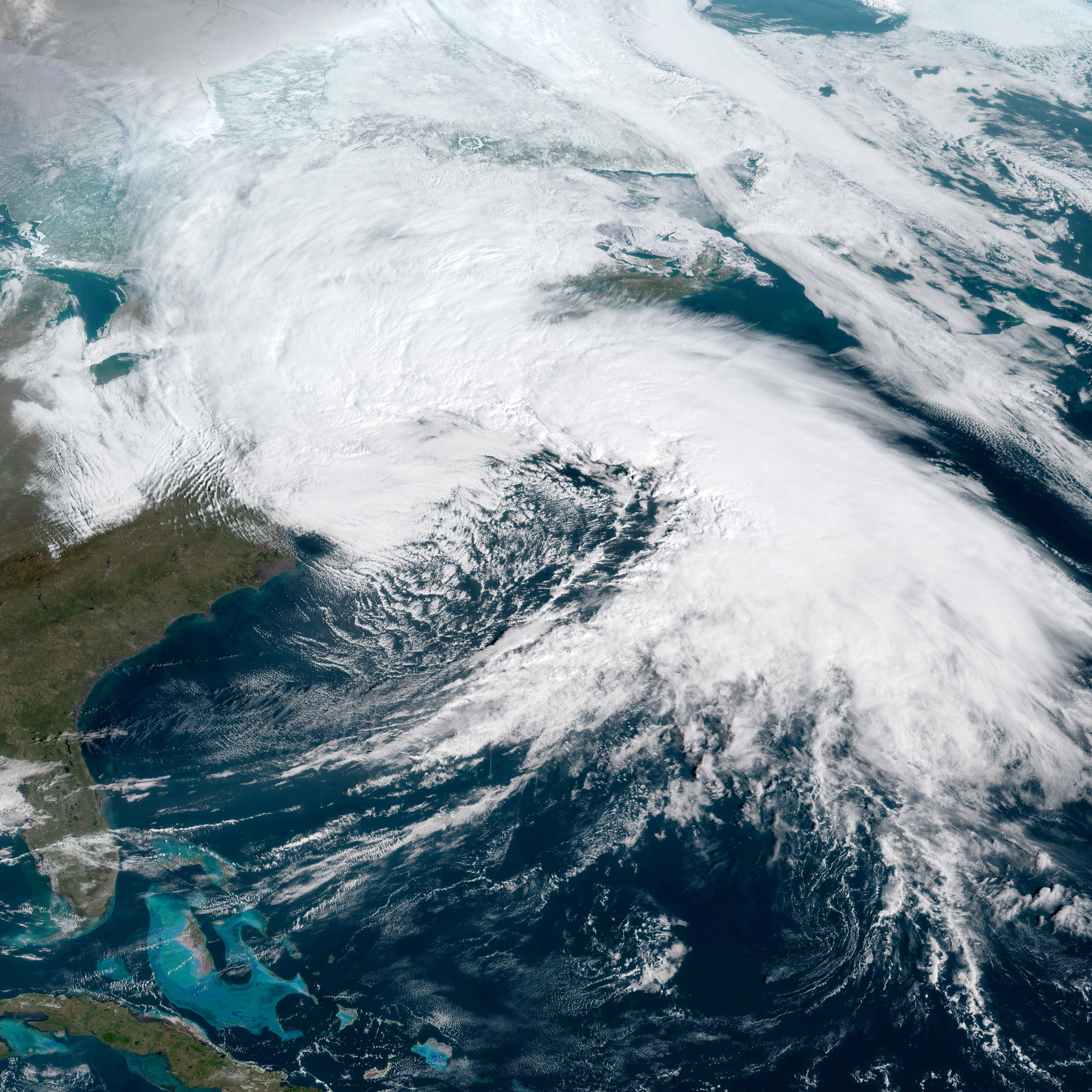
- GOES-16 image of the nor'easter rapidly deepening off the Mid-Atlantic coast on March 2

Meteorological history
- Formed: March 1, 2018
- Dissipated: March 5, 2018

Category 1 "Notable" winter storm
- Regional snowfall index: 2.19 (NOAA)
- Highest gusts: 156 km/h (97 mph) in Wellfleet, Massachusetts
- Lowest pressure: 974 mbar (hPa); 28.76 inHg
- Max. rainfall: 5.74 in (146 mm) in Fenwick, Connecticut
- Max. snowfall: 39.3 in (100 cm) of snow in Cobleskill, New York

Overall effects
- Fatalities: 9
- Damage: $2.25 billion (2018 USD)
- Areas affected: Northeastern United States, Canada
- Power outages: ≥ 1.9 million
- Part of the 2017–18 North American winter

The March 1–3, 2018 nor'easter caused major impacts as well as significant coastal flooding in the Northeastern, Mid-Atlantic and Southeastern United States. It originated as the northernmost low of a stationary front over the Midwest on March 1, which moved eastward into the Northeast later that night. A new low pressure system rapidly formed off the coast on March 2 as it slowly meandered near the coastline. It peaked later that day and brought hurricane-force winds to coastal New England before gradually moving out to sea by March 3. Producing over 2 feet (24 in) of snow in some areas, it was one of the most significant March snowstorms in many areas, particularly in Upstate New York. In other areas, it challenged storm surge records set by other significant storms, such as Hurricane Sandy. It was unofficially named Winter Storm Riley by The Weather Channel.

Although the most severe damage was caused by flooding as well as snow, unusually high tides and storm surges along the coast, wind and downed trees caused massive inland power outages, with the number of outages as high as 1.9 million at one point. By March 4, at least 9 people were known to have been killed as a result of the storm, with 5 of them being killed by falling trees or branches. Recovery efforts were later hampered as a second nor'easter began to impact the area just a few days after the first one struck.

== Meteorological history ==
A stationary front was draped over the central United States on the last day of February 2018. During this time period, dangerous flash flooding occurred as a result. On March 1, one of the northernmost lows split from the boundary and began tracking northwards. Tracking into colder air near the border between the U.S. and Canada, snow broke out in the eastern half of the Midwest; the Weather Prediction Center (WPC) began issuing storm summaries later that day. Overnight into the early morning hours of March 2, a new low formed and rapidly strengthened off the coast of New Jersey, while snow began to slowly increase in coverage near Pennsylvania and southern New York.

Rapid deepening of the low continued as it moved slowly westward, before it bottomed out around 975 millibars (28.8 inHg) or so later that evening. Intrusion of cold air caused heavy wet snow to break out closer to the coast, resulting in snow engulfing much of the Tri-State Area, including New York City and areas further south. Winds also increased as the pressure gradient of the system increased, with gusts reaching as high as 80–90 mph (130–140 km/h) in some areas. Gradually, the storm also began to move out to sea, with the precipitation shield of the system receding from the coast. Consequently, by the early morning hours of March 3, the WPC terminated storm summaries on the storm after it moved far enough away from the East Coast, while also maintaining peak intensity. The system weakened over the next few days, before it split into two systems on March 5, one of which became a hurricane-force low.

== Preparations and impact ==
=== Mid-Atlantic ===
Amtrak suspended rail service along the Northeast Corridor between Washington, D.C., and Boston, along with Keystone Service trains between New York City and Harrisburg, Pennsylvania, on March 2 because of the storm. Over 4,000 flights were cancelled on March 2 due to the storm. Also because of the storm, over 2.2 million customers in the Northeast United States lost power.

==== Virginia ====
Winds from the storm whip flags and a banner at a Shell station in Fairfax County.

The storm brought rain and heavy winds to the Hampton Roads area on March 2. Several flights were cancelled at Norfolk International Airport and Dominion Virginia Power reported 36,000 customers in the Hampton Roads area without power. A total of 500,000 customers lost power in Virginia from the storm. Winds from the storm resulted in the Chesapeake Bay Bridge-Tunnel being closed much of the day on March 2. Virginia Railway Express suspended service on March 2. Schools in Fairfax and Prince William counties were closed due to high winds. Wind gusts of 71 miles per hour (114 km/h) were reported at Washington Dulles International Airport and 62 miles per hour (100 km/h) at Ronald Reagan Washington National Airport. Pilots from a flight bound to Washington Dulles International Airport reported that nearly every passenger vomited due to extreme turbulence from the storm. A 6-year-old boy was killed when a tree fell onto his family's home in Virginia.

Southbound Interstate 95 lanes were shut down in Woodbridge to inspect the Potomac Mills shopping mall sign along the interstate, which appeared bent during the storm.

==== Washington, D.C. ====
In Washington, D.C., the federal government closed offices due to the storm, and the Smithsonian museums also closed. The Washington Metro reduced speeds and decreased the frequency of train service. Metrobus and regional bus services saw delays due to downed trees and wires. Schools in Washington, D.C., cancelled scheduled parent-teacher conferences for the day.

==== Maryland ====
A 77-year-old woman in Kingsville was killed when she was struck by a tree branch. An apartment building in Suitland partially collapsed, displacing 300 residents. Montgomery County Public Schools and Howard County Public Schools were closed due to the storm. As of 4 PM EST on March 2, BGE and PEPCO reported 253,000 customers without power in their service area. Along with Amtrak service, MARC service was suspended indefinitely on all lines. MDOT also shut down the Chesapeake Bay Bridge several times throughout the day. Tydings Bridge on Interstate 95 and Hatem Bridge on U.S. Route 40 were also shut down indefinitely due to two tractor trailers flipping over from high winds. A downed tree blocked southbound Interstate 95 in White Marsh. Dozens of cars were destroyed in Baltimore City due to trees toppling over from a combination of saturated ground and wind. This storm was the worst wind storm in the area since Hurricane Sandy in 2012. When leaving to attend the funeral of Billy Graham, President Donald Trump could not fly out of Joint Base Andrews and had to depart from Dulles Airport instead.

==== Delaware ====
In Sussex County, the storm brought rain and high winds on March 2, with gusts reaching 50 miles per hour (80 km/h). The winds knocked down trees and blew debris around. The Cape May-Lewes Ferry delayed a morning departure and suspended service for the rest of the day on March 2. Delmarva Power reported tens of thousands of customers without power across the state.

==== Pennsylvania ====
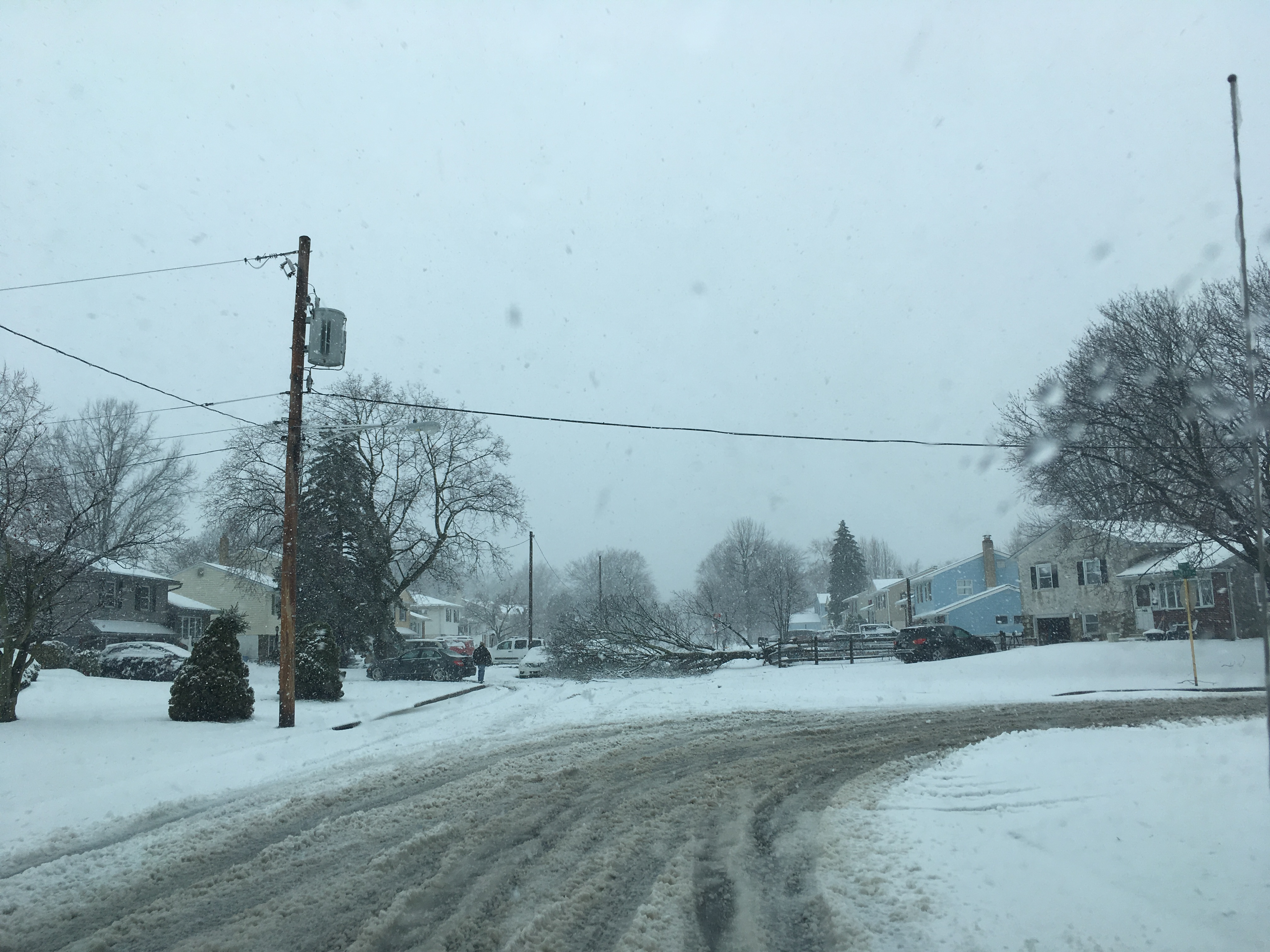
Downed tree and snow caused by the storm in Upper Moreland Township, Pennsylvania

In the Philadelphia area, the storm brought snow, poor visibility, and wind on March 2, with the wind taking down trees and power lines. PECO Energy Company reported over 616,000 customers without power across the Philadelphia area. Due to high winds, repairs did not begin until March 3 and power restoration could take several days. A 57-year-old man was killed when a tree fell onto his car in Upper Merion Township. A tree fell onto a SEPTA bus traveling along the Schuylkill Expressway in Lower Merion Township. Service on some SEPTA Regional Rail lines was suspended because of the storm. American Airlines cancelled flights at Philadelphia International Airport on March 2 due to the storm.

In the Lehigh Valley and Pocono Mountains regions of Pennsylvania, the storm brought heavy snow and wind on March 2, which led to dozens of car accidents. Speed limits were reduced along portions of Interstate 80, Interstate 81, and Interstate 380 in eastern Pennsylvania. Interstate 380 later shut down and people were trapped for up to 24 hours. The snow and wind brought down trees and power lines, with PPL Corporation reporting over 100,000 outages. Many schools in the Lehigh Valley and Pocono Mountains closed or dismissed early on March 2. Court offices in Monroe County closed early on March 2. LANta buses between Bethlehem and the Slate Belt operated on a snow emergency detour. In Berks County, the storm brought down trees and power lines on March 2, with Met-Ed reporting 6,254 outages in the county and PPL Corporation reporting 1,084 outages in the county. Winds toppled a tractor trailer along Interstate 78 near Hamburg and brought a tree and wires down onto an unoccupied vehicle in Exeter Township. High winds toppled a school bus in Chambersburg.

==== New Jersey ====
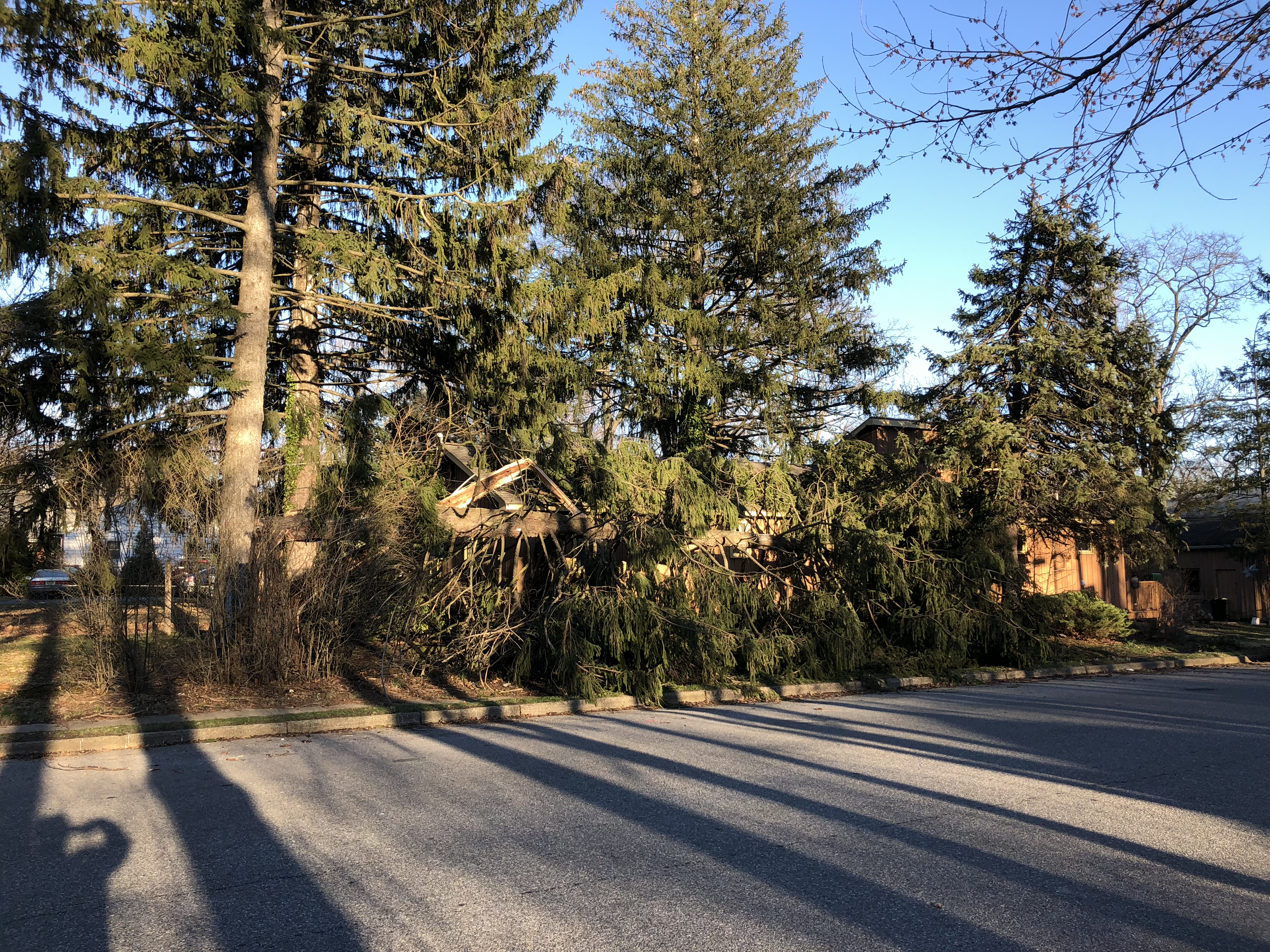
Downed tree caused by the storm in Ewing Township, New Jersey

Sussex County in the northern part of the state reported 10 inches (25 cm) of snow. At the Jersey Shore, the storm caused minor flooding and road closures during the high tide on the morning of March 2. Two local roads in Absecon were closed from flooding and there was flooding on U.S. Route 40 leading into Atlantic City. Flooding also caused lane closures along portions of Route 35 in Brick and Belmar while floodwaters covered roads in Neptune and Highlands. Some flights were cancelled at Newark Liberty International Airport. Atlantic City Electric reported 29,111 customers without power and PSE&G reported tens of thousands of customers without power. New Jersey Transit cancelled some service.

==== New York ====
Snow was reported in Albany and Syracuse. Blizzard warnings were issued in portions of Upstate New York, where 50 mph (80 km/h) winds and more than a foot of snow was forecasted. Eastern Long Island saw over 4 inches (100 mm) of rain. New York City experienced rain, snow, sleet, and winds. A tractor trailer overturned on the Verrazzano–Narrows Bridge. Nearly half of the flights out of LaGuardia Airport were cancelled on March 2. An 11-year-old boy was killed by a falling tree in Putnam Valley. A total of 14 inches (36 cm) of snow fell in Hornell, while 40 inches (100 cm) of snow fell in Richmondville. The heaviness of the wet snow that fell in Western New York was a major factor in prolonged blackouts in the area.

=== New England ===
==== Connecticut ====
Connecticut experienced heavy rain, flooding, and heavy winds from the storm.

==== Rhode Island ====
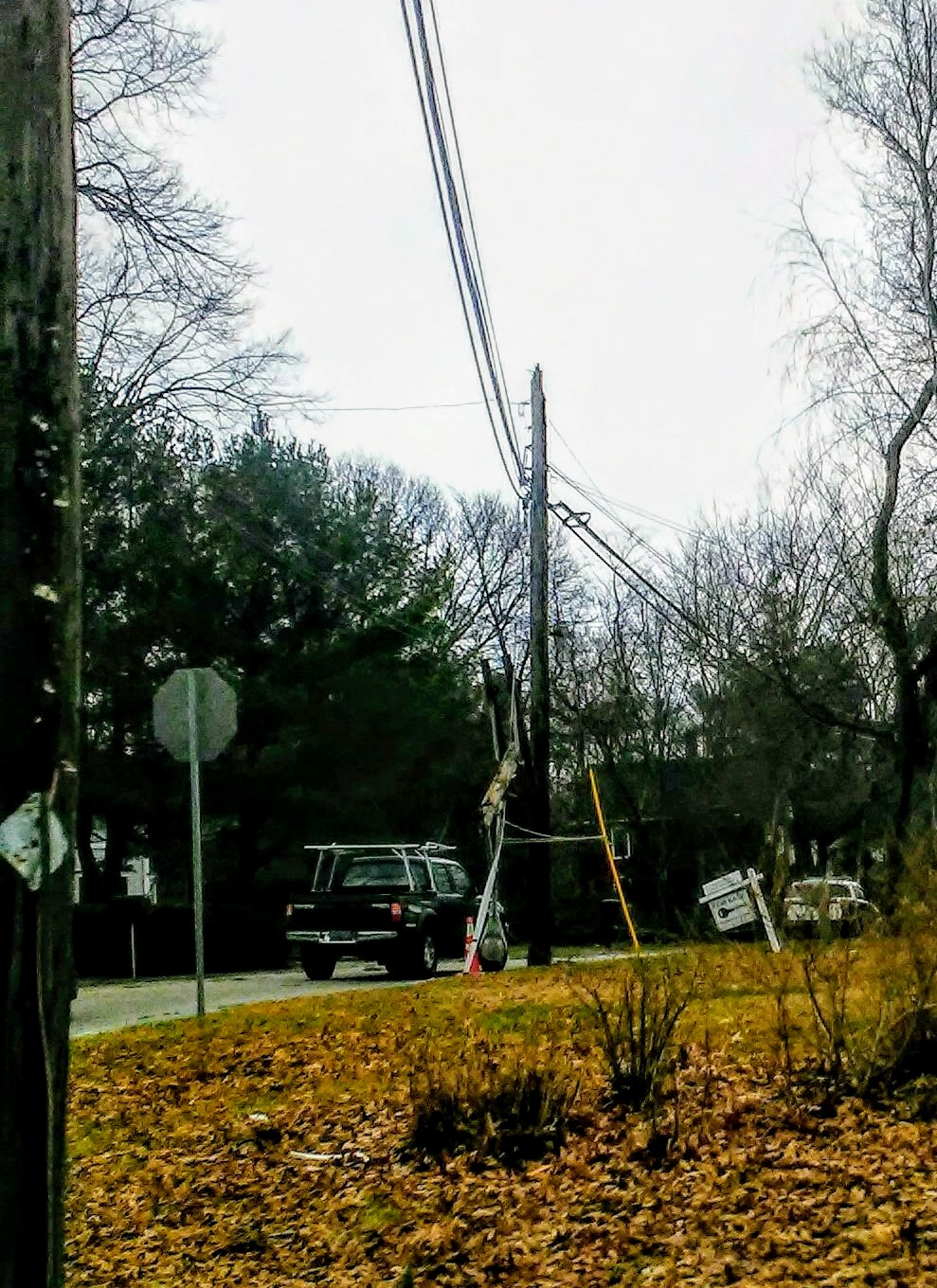
Damaged utility pole following the storm in Seekonk, Massachusetts

Rhode Island experienced rain and wind. Hurricane-force wind gusts were reported in the state, peaking at 83 miles per hour (134 km/h) in Little Compton. Several bridges had to be closed to commercial traffic when a truck blew over on the Newport Pell Bridge.

==== Massachusetts ====
Hurricane-force wind gusts were reported in Massachusetts, peaking at 97 miles per hour (156 km/h) in Wellfleet, 95 miles per hour (153 km/h) in Chatham, and 93 miles per hour (150 km/h) in Barnstable. Boston recorded a peak gust of 70 miles per hour (110 km/h) while experiencing heavy rain and coastal flooding from the storm. The city experienced its third highest tide on record at 14.67 feet (4.47 m). Several flights were cancelled at Logan International Airport in Boston. A tree fell onto a car in Tewksbury. A woman in Woburn suffered a severe leg injury when she was pinned to the ground by a falling tree while picking up her son from elementary school. Waves were described as "higher than a two-story house" and the Boston Globe said 1,800 evacuated Scituate. In Braintree, strong winds ripped the roofs off an elementary school and a middle school. Over 4 inches (100 mm) of rain fell in the eastern part of the state.

==== Maine ====
On March 5, the storm uncovered a shipwreck in York, Maine, believed to have been built sometime between 1750 and 1850.

== See also ==
- November 2012 nor'easter
- March 2013 nor'easter
- March 2014 nor'easter
- March 2017 North American blizzard
- January 2018 North American blizzard
- March 6–8, 2018 nor'easter – a similar storm that followed this storm just a few days later
