= March 6–8, 2018 nor'easter =

Northeaster U.S. winter storm

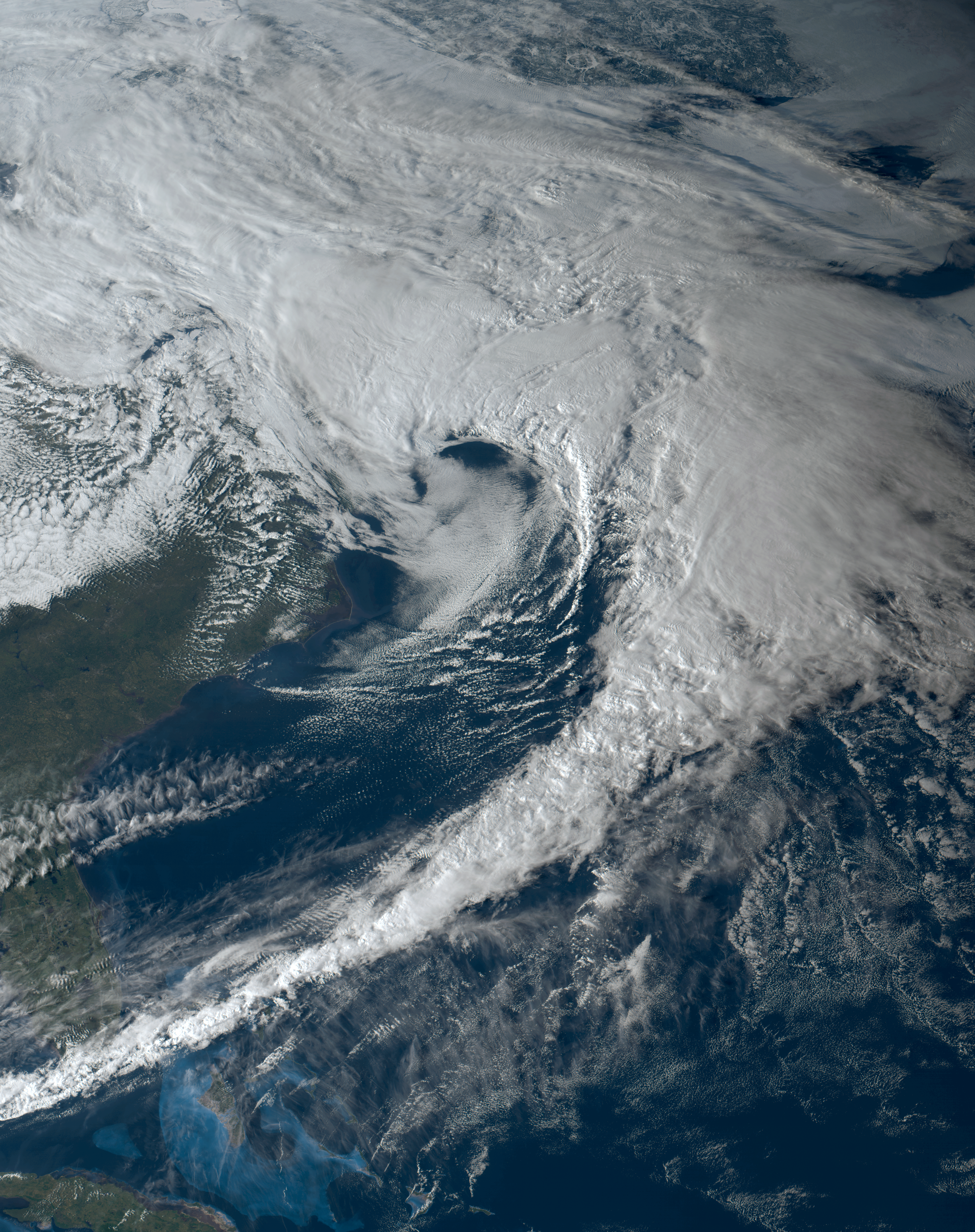
- GOES-16 satellite image of the nor'easter rapidly deepening off the coast of the Northeastern U.S. on March 7

Meteorological history
- Formed: March 2, 2018
- Dissipated: March 9, 2018

Category 1 "Notable" winter storm
- Regional snowfall index: 2.48 (NOAA)
- Highest gusts: 59 mph (95 km/h) in Mashpee, Massachusetts
- Lowest pressure: 986 mbar (hPa); 29.12 inHg
- Max. snowfall: 36.0 in (91 cm) in Woodford, Vermont

Overall effects
- Fatalities: 2
- Damage: $525 million (2018 USD)
- Areas affected: Northeastern United States, Canada
- Power outages: ≥ 1 million
- Part of the 2017–18 North American winter

The March 6–8, 2018 nor'easter caused additional disruption and significant snowfall to the Northeastern United States just days after another intense nor'easter struck the Mid-Atlantic, hampering recovery efforts from that storm. Forming on March 2 and reaching the Outer Banks late on March 6, as the end phase of a long-tracked winter storm across the country, it rapidly deepened off the Mid-Atlantic coast on March 7 and brought up to 3 feet (36 in) of heavy snow, whiteout conditions, and even coastal flooding (though nowhere near the levels seen in the prior nor'easter) to those in the impact zone from the storm, many of whom were still without power from the previous storm less than a week prior.

The storm caused up to 1 million people to lose power, and at least two people were confirmed dead due to the storm by March 7. Hundreds of flights were cancelled across the region, and many schools closed due to the nor'easter, although some opted to remain open, such as those in New York City, causing controversy. Many freeways were also closed in the regions, and several states were put under state of emergencies.

== Meteorological history ==
While the previous nor'easter hammered the Northeastern U.S. on March 2–3, another winter storm had begun developing in the western part of the country, dumping very heavy snow in the Sierra Nevada Mountains. This storm moved into the Upper Midwest over the next few days and became an intense snowstorm for the affected areas. By early on March 6, the system had reached the Great Lakes, with the surface low beginning to weaken. As it did so, energy began to be transferred over to a new area of low pressure that was forming near the Outer Banks late that day. As the new low began to rapidly intensify, the Weather Prediction Center (WPC) began issuing storm summaries on the intensifying low off the coast of New Jersey early on March 7. A sharp transition of heavy snow to rain was observed near the Jersey Shore, due to warm air aloft pushing slightly inland, with the cold air residing just inland. Thundersnow and snowfall rates of up to 3 inches (7.6 cm) an hour were reported in areas around the New York metropolitan area, signaling the rapid intensification of the storm. Late in the afternoon, an eye-like feature was spotted near the center of the storm. The pressure bottomed out at 986 mbar (29.1 inHg) around the same time.

After peaking, the system began to gradually weaken as it continued moving northeastwards towards the Canadian Maritimes late on March 7–8, while heavy snowfall fell around the areas near Boston, Massachusetts. Turning northwestward slightly, moderate snowfall continued to occur over the coastal and interior sections of New England. The low continued to spin down throughout the day, with snow tapering off in much of the region except for the northern parts of New York and far northern New England. By 15:00 UTC the next day, the system had weakened to the point where the WPC terminated storm summaries on the winter storm. It dissipated shortly afterwards.

== Preparations and impact ==
=== Mid-Atlantic states ===
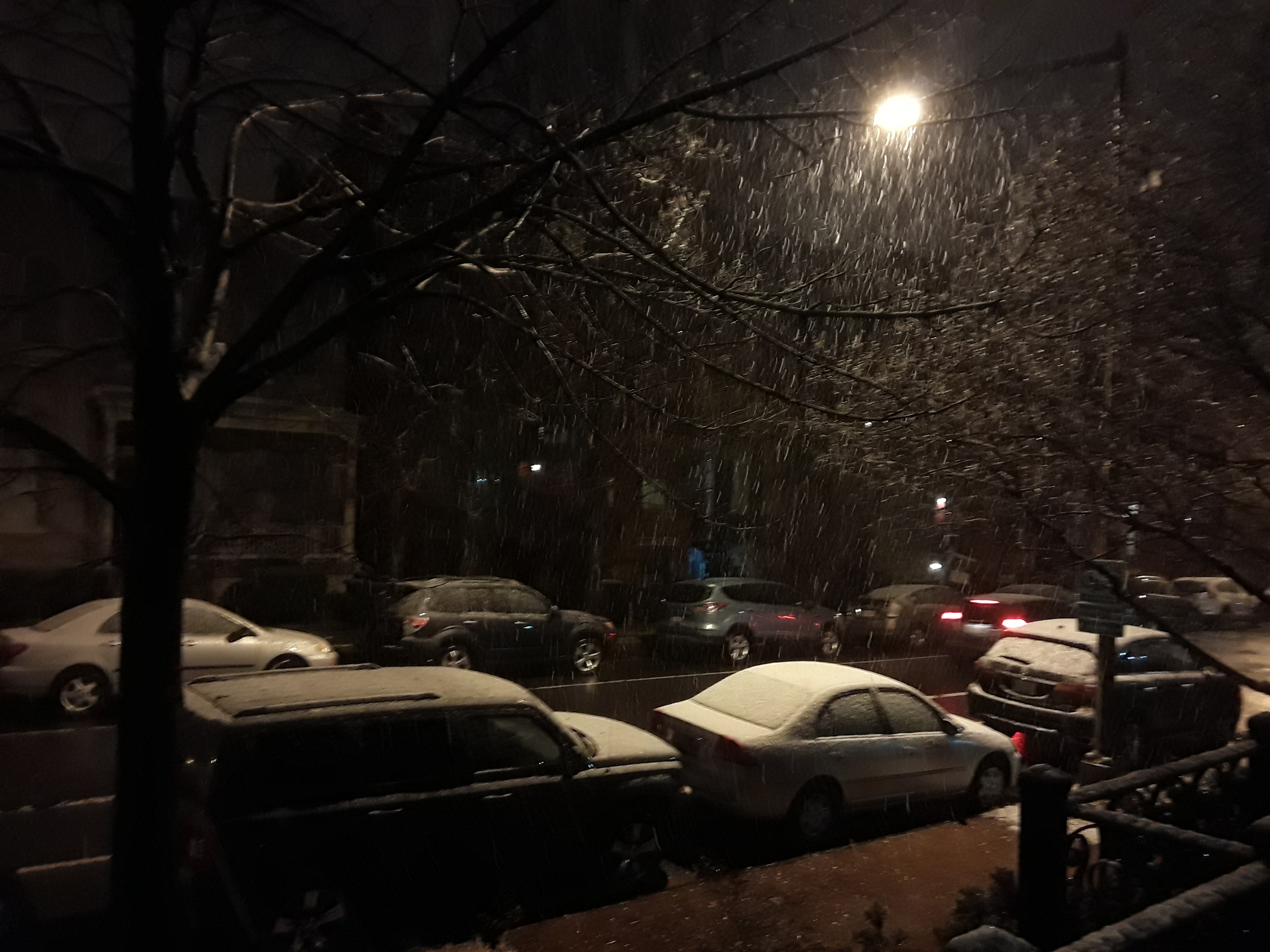
Snow falls in Capitol Hill, Washington, D.C., on the night of March 6.

Amtrak operated a modified schedule along the Northeast Corridor on March 7 due to the storm. About 2,500 flights were cancelled and several schools were closed in the Northeast United States on March 7 because of the upcoming storm.

==== North Carolina ====
The storm caused coastal flooding along the Outer Banks, with North Carolina Highway 12 closed between Rodanthe and the Herbert C. Bonner Bridge.

==== Maryland and Delaware ====
Several schools in Maryland were closed due to snow. The storm caused flooding along some streets in Annapolis. Flooding from high tides was also seen in some communities along the Chesapeake Bay including Cambridge, Crisfield, and Deal Island. In Delaware, the Delaware Memorial Bridge was temporarily closed due to several tractor-trailers being disabled. It was re-opened a few hours later after the vehicles were removed. The Delaware General Assembly cancelled its session for March 7 while the University of Delaware closed at noon on March 7.

==== Pennsylvania ====
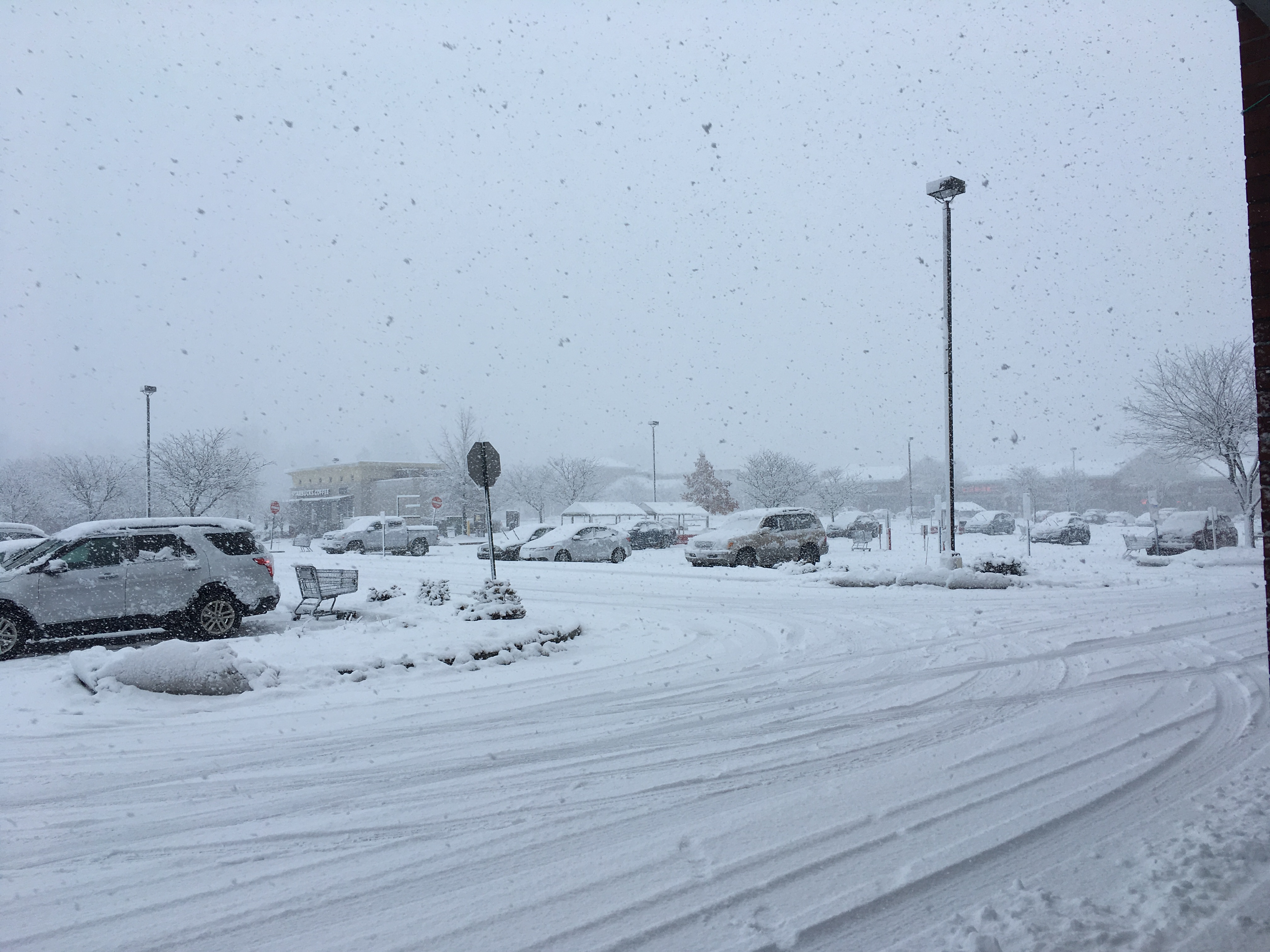
Snow from the nor'easter in Huntingdon Valley, Pennsylvania

In Pennsylvania, Governor Tom Wolf declared a state of emergency for several counties in the eastern part of the state. A snow emergency went into effect for the city of Philadelphia on the morning of March 7. Several municipalities in the Philadelphia area declared snow emergencies and many schools and government offices were closed on March 7. Many attractions in the Philadelphia area either closed early or were closed for the entire day on March 7. SEPTA modified their service plan for March 7 due to the snow, with Regional Rail trains running on a modified Saturday schedule and Broad Street Line and Market–Frankford Line trains running during the overnight hours. In addition, several SEPTA bus routes were placed on detours in advance of the storm. On the afternoon of March 7, SEPTA suspended most of their bus services due to the snow. At the Philadelphia International Airport, a ground stop was issued in place. The Pennsylvania Department of Transportation implemented speed restrictions of 45 mph (72 km/h) on several freeways in the southeastern part of the state while the Pennsylvania Turnpike Commission reduced the speed limit to 45 mph (72 km/h) on portions of the Pennsylvania Turnpike and the Northeast Extension (Interstate 476) in the Philadelphia area. Further north, Interstate 380 was preemptively closed. High-profile vehicles such as empty trucks, motorcycles, and recreational vehicles were banned along several Interstate Highways in eastern Pennsylvania due to the storm.

==== New Jersey ====
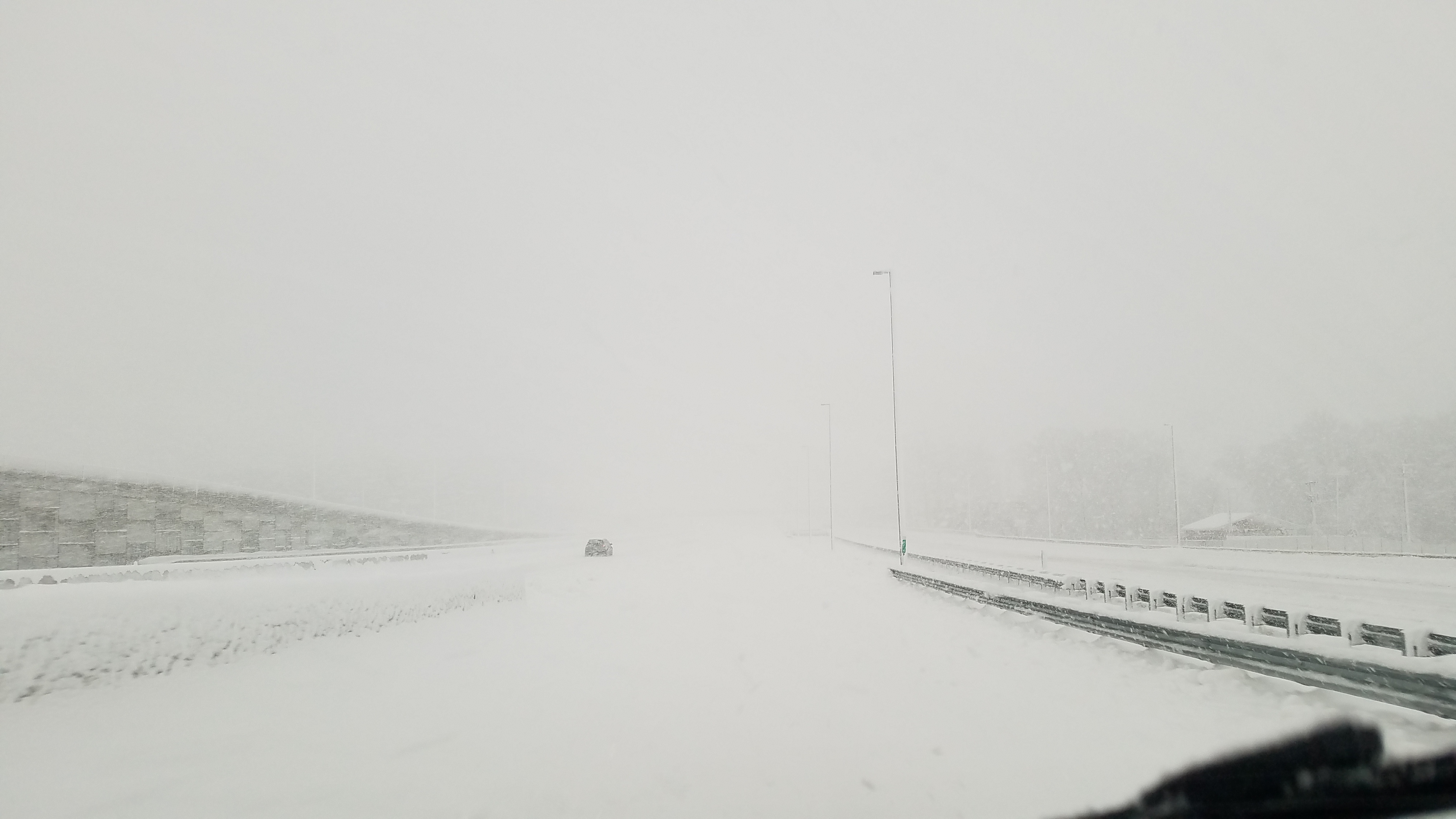
Near whiteout conditions on the New Jersey Turnpike in East Windsor Township, New Jersey.

In New Jersey, Governor Phil Murphy declared a state of emergency and state offices were closed on March 7. New Jersey Transit suspended bus service statewide on the afternoon of March 7, with trains running an abbreviated schedule. More than 322,000 customers in the state were without power, including people who had lost power from a prior storm on March 2. Newark Liberty International Airport was closed briefly during the afternoon of March 7, with limited service soon resuming. The storm forced the closure of the Burlington-Bristol Bridge over the Delaware River. Thundersnow was seen in the state, with lightning striking a teacher in Manchester Township, who suffered injuries and was in stable condition. Snowmobiles had to be sent out to rescue travelers on Interstate 280 and Interstate 78 who had become stuck in the snow during the storm, some who had been trapped for over five hours. About 500 vehicles were reported to have gotten stuck during the incident.

==== New York ====
In New York City, the exceptionally heavy snow made travel difficult, with ferry service suspended. Central Park reported 3.2 inches (8.1 cm), while JFK International Airport reported only 2.8 inches (7.1 cm), which was much less than many of the forecasts, which suggested that 1–2 feet of snow would fall. However, there was a very sharp gradient in snow totals, with Franklin Lakes, NJ reporting a total of 24.8 inches (63 cm). Thundersnow fell in New York City. In North White Plains, 10 people were taken to the hospital with carbon monoxide poisoning from a generator running inside their home. Governor Andrew Cuomo announced a travel ban for tractor-trailers along the New York State Thruway between New York City and Syracuse. Classes were cancelled until March 9 at Binghamton University due to the storm. Many schools in the Lower Hudson Valley closed for the fifth time in a row, eliminating most of the districts’ spring breaks (from Friday, March 2 to Thursday, March 8). Putnam County issued a State Of Emergency, closing all school districts in the county on Thursday, March 8.

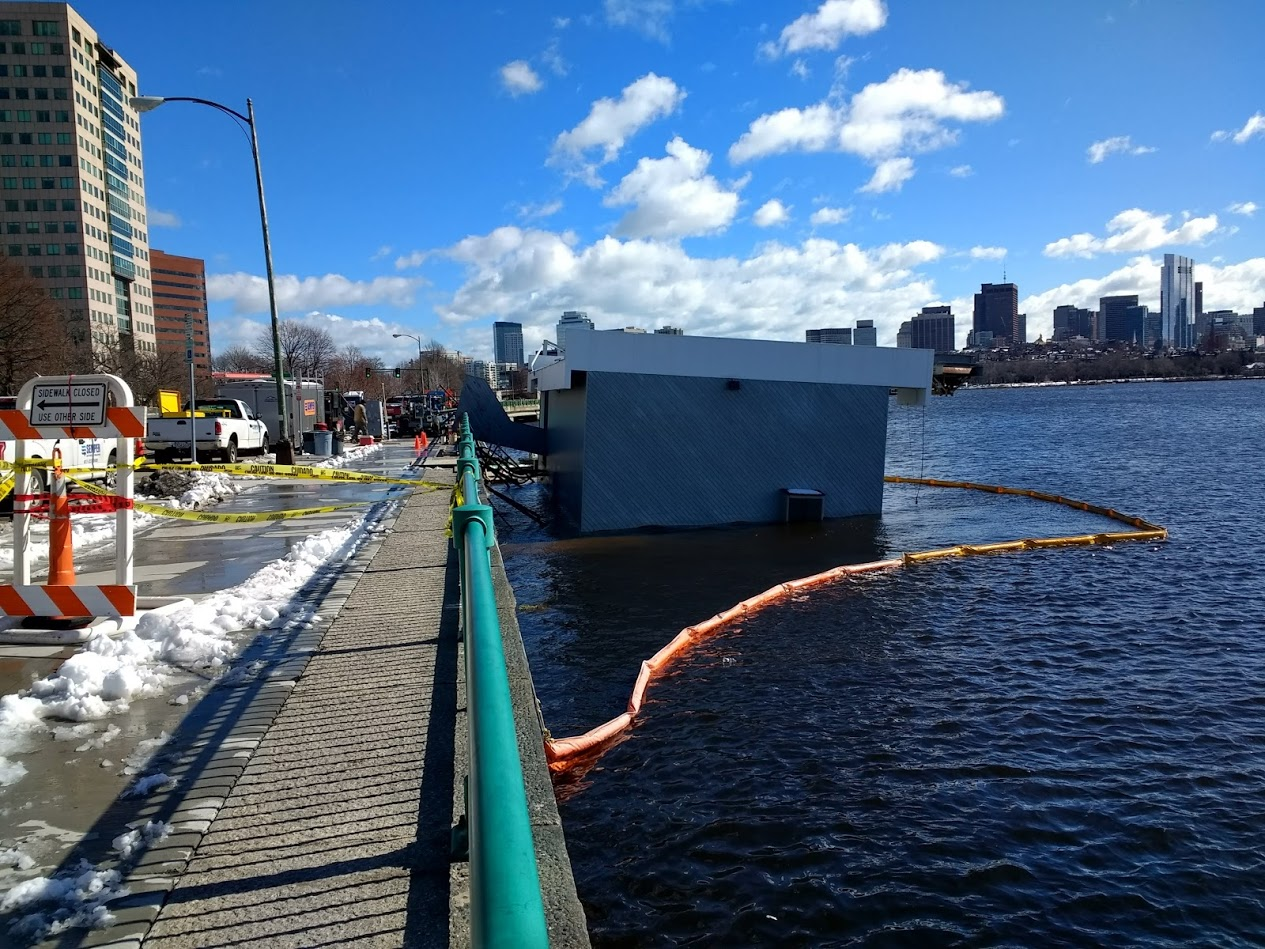
The Harvard Sailing Center in Cambridge, Massachusetts partially sinking into the Charles River during the nor'easter.

=== New England ===
==== Connecticut ====
In Connecticut, Governor Dannel Malloy sent nonessential state employees home early on March 7 ahead of the anticipated heavy snow. At the height of the storm, over 160,000 residents were without electricity. New Fairfield had the greatest accumulation in the state with 28 inches (71 cm) of snow.

==== Massachusetts ====
In Boston, several shuttle bus routes were cancelled for the rest of the week due to the storm. Crews worked to secure a seawall in Duxbury that was damaged by a prior storm on March 2. After the storm had passed, on March 8, a commuter train slid off the tracks in Wilmington after it struck a tree that was lodged into the tracks. No one was injured in the incident.

The Harvard Sailing Center in Cambridge, Massachusetts partially sank into the Charles River during the nor'easter. The building was compromised due to a failure of the flotation device used to keep the structure afloat.

== See also ==
- March 2013 nor'easter
- March 2014 nor'easter
- February 9–11, 2017 North American blizzard
- February 12–14, 2017 North American blizzard
- March 1–3, 2018 nor'easter – the previous nor'easter that hit the area just a few days prior
