= December 2019 North American storm complex =

- The storm in the northeast Gulf of Mexico

Meteorological history
- Formed: December 20, 2019
- Dissipated: December 26, 2019

Extratropical cyclone
- Lowest pressure: 1007 hPa (mbar); 29.74 inHg

Overall effects
- Damage: $125 million (2020 USD)
- Areas affected: Eastern United States (especially South Carolina and Georgia)

The December 2019 North American storm complex was an extratropical cyclone that dumped heavy rain in the Southeast United States. Forming from a front in the Gulf Of Mexico on December 20, 2019, it organized into an extratropical cyclone, and with most of the convection pushed to the northeast of the center, it gave heavy rains that prompted flash flooding in the Southeast. The center later moved over Florida on December 24, and dissipated on December 26.

The storm caused heavy rains, and intense flash flooding, that severely disrupted holiday travel. Airports were forced to shut down due to up to 6 inches of rain, and up to a foot of rain fell in some areas. It also gave gale-force winds to many areas. There was also the threat of tornadoes, but none were reported in the complex. Overall, damage amounted to $125 million, and no casualties were reported.

== Meteorological history ==
A front draped over Texas formed a low-pressure system on December 21. The low moved south and organized in the Gulf of Mexico, becoming an organized extratropical cyclone on the next day. The extratropical cyclone, along with becoming occluded, gained abundant amounts of moisture that were pushed to the northeast of the center. Combined with the slow movement of the storm, it resulted in very heavy, prolonged rains over the Southeastern United States. The storm peaked the same day, with an estimated minimum central pressure of 1,007 millibars (29.7 inHg). The low moved over Florida on December 24 and continued moving east. Now weakening, the storm moved southward, due to a large high-pressure system, and the center became less distinct, and the center dissipated on December 26, the day after Christmas Day.

== Preparations ==
The South Carolina Department of Transportation warned of citizens to be cautious of flooded roads, saying that drivers should use "extreme caution". Flash Flood Warnings were put in place for many counties in Georgia and South Carolina, and in some airports, most flights were delayed.

== Impacts ==
The drenching rains caused roads to be flooded throughout South Carolina, breaking a daily record in Charleston set in 1941. In Fort Lauderdale, the airport there was closed due to the very heavy flooding and high wind, which was caused by around a foot of rain caused by the storm. The closing of the airports caused major delays in Christmas travel. In Georgia, high winds downed trees and power lines, which left thousands of customers without power.

== See also ==
- December 2015 North American storm complex
- 2016 North American Christmas blizzard
- 2020–21 New Year's North American storm complex
