= 2020–21 North American winter =

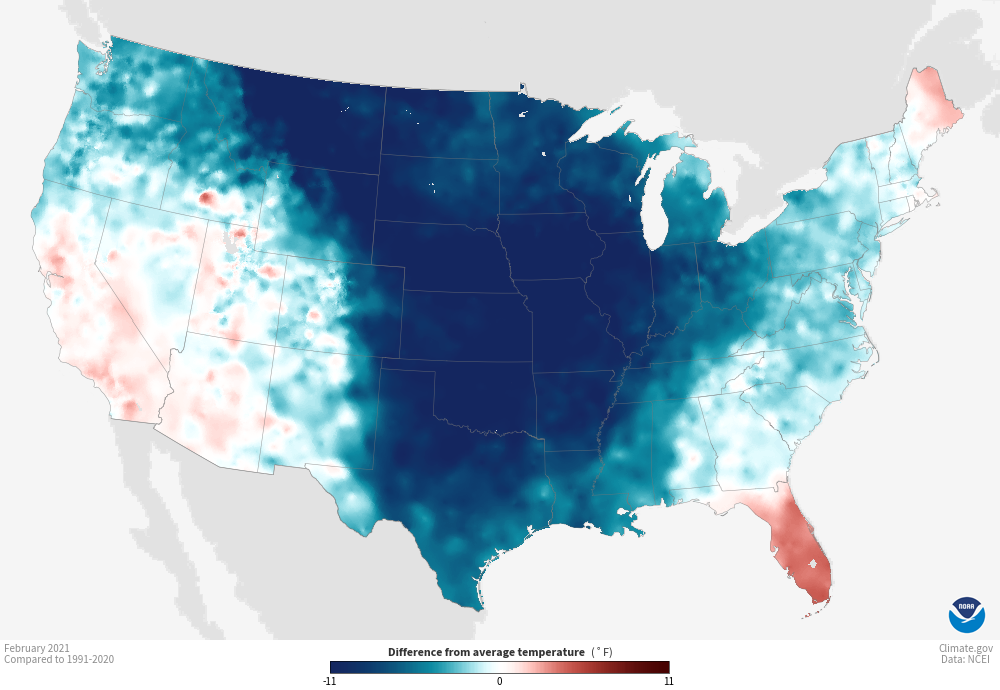
- A map showcasing the below-average temperature anomalies across the United States during the month of February 2021

Seasonal boundaries
- Meteorological winter: December 1 – February 28
- Astronomical winter: December 21 – March 19
- First event started: October 26, 2020
- Last event concluded: April 17, 2021

Most notable event
- Name: February 13–17, 2021 North American winter storm
  - Duration: February 13–17, 2021
  - Lowest pressure: 960 mb (28.35 inHg)
  - Fatalities: ≥ 290 fatalities
  - Damage: ≥ $25.5 billion (2021 USD)

Seasonal statistics
- Total WPC-issued storms: 19 total (Note: Retrospectively includes 5 storms that did not have summaries or reports written for them including on the prototype Event Review page, but were tracked through WPC surface analyses and were significant enough to still warrant inclusion within this page. These include events on November 29, December 5, January 12, February 8, and April 15.)
- Rated storms (RSI) (Cat. 1+): 6 total
- Major storms (RSI) (Cat. 3+): 4 total
- Maximum snowfall accumulation: 107 in (270 cm) at Mammoth Mountain Ski Area, California (January 25–29, 2021)
- Maximum ice accretion: 2 in (51 mm) at El Reno, Oklahoma (October 26–28, 2020)
- Total fatalities: At least 358 total
- Total damage: ≥ $31.75 billion (2021 USD) (Costliest winter season on record)

Related articles
- 2020–21 European windstorm season

The 2020–21 North American winter was the most significant winter season to affect North America in several years, and the costliest on record, with a damage total of at least $33.35 billion dollars (2021 USD). The season featured historic arctic blasts and multiple winter storms across much of the country. The Weather Prediction Center (WPC) tracked a total of 19 total significant winter storms, while six storms were ranked on the Regional Snowfall Index scale (RSI), four of which ranked as at least a Category 3. Most of the winter's damage and fatalities occurred due to a historic and major cold wave in mid-February. Several other significant events occurred, including a crippling early-season ice storm in the Southern Plains, a powerful nor'easter in mid-December, another major nor'easter in early February, two major and widespread winter storms in mid-February, and a major blizzard in the Rocky Mountains in mid-March. The winter-related events were responsible for at least 358 fatalities, making it the deadliest season since 1992–93. A La Niña pattern influenced much of the winter in North America.

Much of the country saw some form of winter weather and often significant impacts as a result, reflected by the numerous storms rated on the RSI. In mid-December, a significant Category 2 nor'easter affected much of the Northeastern United States with heavy snow and ice. Over 3 ft (0.91 m) of snow was reported across a swath in the interior Northeast, and the system caused seven fatalities. In early February, a major Category 3 nor'easter, which started out as a winter storm on the West Coast, impacted an even larger area with heavy snow, also causing seven fatalities. In mid-February, a series of two major Category 3 winter storms brought a swath of widespread snow and ice from the Pacific Northwest, through the Deep South, and to the Northeast. In total, the two winter storms resulted in at least $33.3 billion in damage, nearly 14 million power outages, and a total of 319 fatalities. In mid-March, a historic Category 3 blizzard unfolded in the Rocky Mountains, with Denver and Cheyenne seeing one of their largest March snowstorms on record.

While there is no well-agreed-upon date used to indicate the start of winter in the Northern Hemisphere, there are two definitions of winter which may be used. Based on the astronomical definition, winter began at the winter solstice on December 21, 2020 and ended at the spring equinox on March 20, 2021. Based on the meteorological definition, the first day of winter was on December 1 and the last day was February 28. However, as illustrated by the late October ice storm and the mid-April nor'easter, winter storms occasionally occur outside of these limits. Since both definitions of winter span the start of the calendar year, it is possible to have a winter storm in two different years, as shown by the New Year's winter storm this season.

== Seasonal forecasts ==
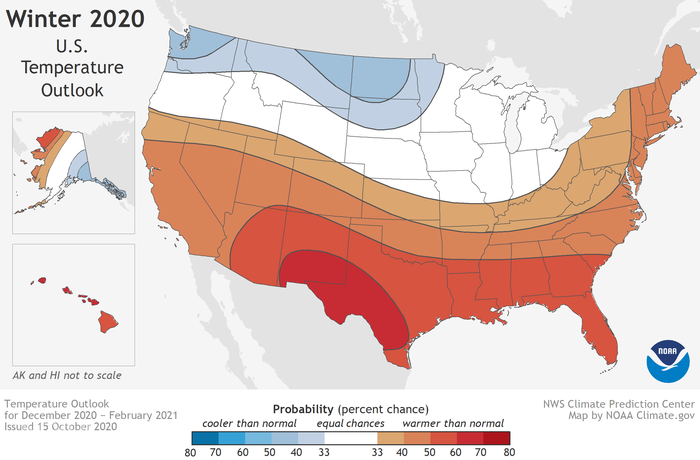
Temperature outlook

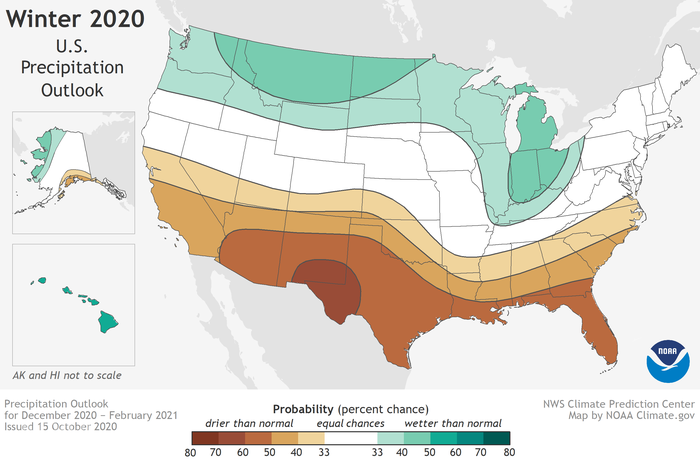
Precipitation outlook

On October 15, 2020, the National Oceanic and Atmospheric Administration's Climate Prediction Center released its U.S. Winter Outlook. The temperature and precipitation outlooks reflected the likelihood of a La Niña pattern developing during most of the winter. The forecast called for warmer than average temperatures across much of the southern and southwestern United States, as well as the East Coast, with cooler than average temperatures in the far northwestern United States. Near-average temperatures were expected in the Midwest. The forecast also called for drier than average conditions across almost all of the southeastern and southwestern United States, and wetter than average conditions in much of the northern tier and Midwest, with near-average precipitation in the Northeast and parts of the Midwest.

On November 30, 2020, Environment Canada released its winter outlook for December, January and February as part of their monthly climate outlooks. The agency predicted near to above average temperatures across most of Canada; particularly in the southern regions of the nation, such as southern British Columbia, southern Ontario, Quebec, and especially Atlantic Canada. Below average temperatures were expected to develop in the northern regions of the providences, as well in the northern Canadian Prairies due to the polar vortex and La Nina. Above average precipitation was forecasted to occur in British Columbia, southern Quebec, and quite evidently Atlantic Canada as well.

== Seasonal summary ==
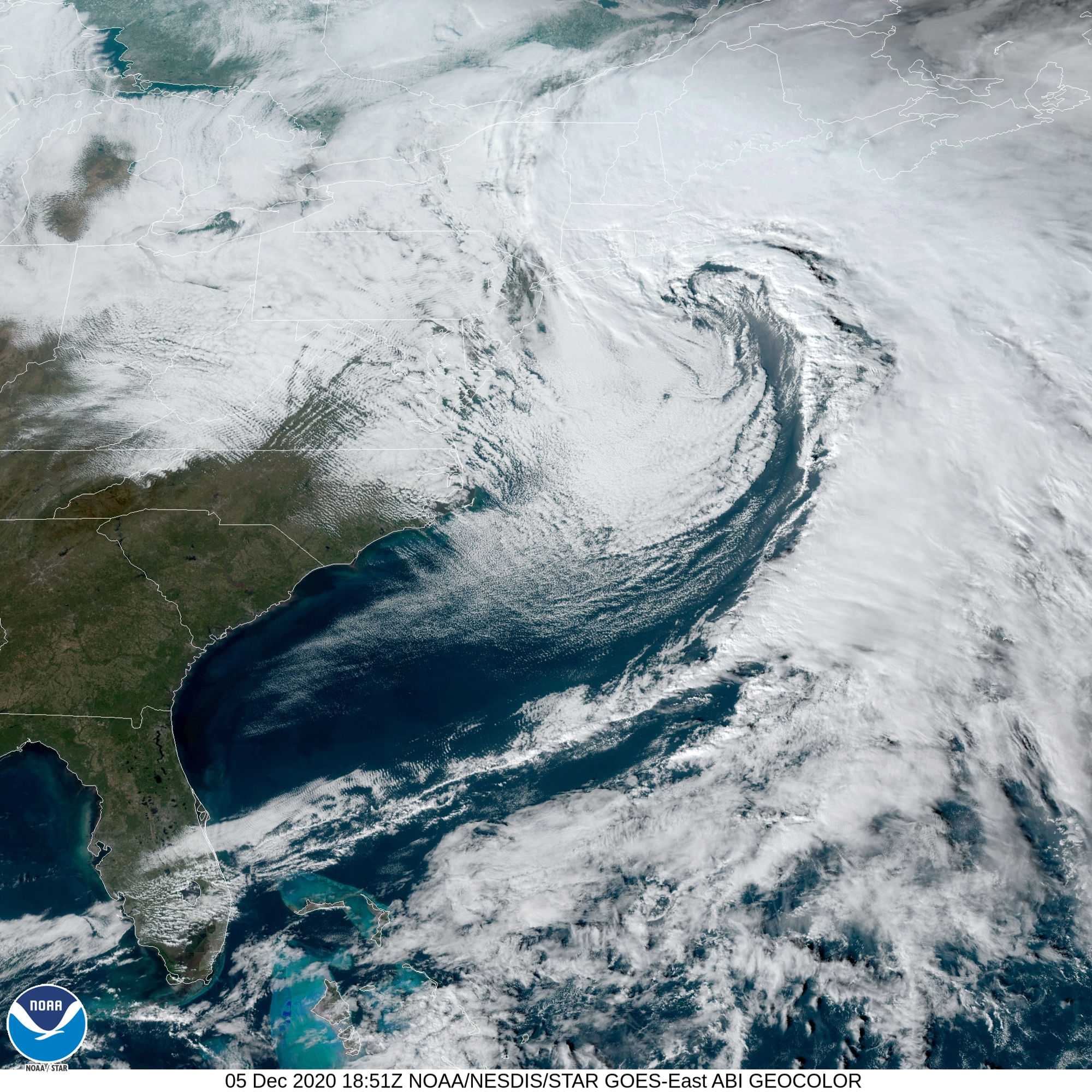
Satellite image of a powerful nor'easter impacting New England on December 5

Winter weather events began in late October in North America, with a crippling and devastating ice storm in the Southern Plains, which later merged with the remnants of Hurricane Zeta and produced more snow in New England. November was generally quiet in terms of winter weather, with only a few minor snow events in the Midwest. Late in the month however, a storm system moved through the Ohio Valley bringing over 9 inches (23 cm) of snow to Cleveland, and over 24 inches (61 cm) of snow to areas just south of Lake Erie in northeast Ohio. December began with a nor'easter that impacted parts of New England with heavy snow. Later in the month, a powerful nor'easter brought heavy and impactful snow to widespread areas of the Northeastern United States and southern Canada. Major cities such as New York City, Pittsburgh, and Boston saw over 10 inches (25 cm) of snow from the system. Areas farther inland saw as much as 44 inches (110 cm) of snow. Around Christmas week, a powerful blizzard impacted the Midwestern United States and Canada, which also caused severe storms in the Southeast. A powerful extratropical cyclone in the Bering Sea late in the month reached winds of over 100 mph (160 km/h) and a minimum central pressure of 921 mb (27.2 inHg) west of Alaska. It later moved on to hit Alaska, after only slightly weakening, causing high surf and gusty winds in the Aleutian Islands.

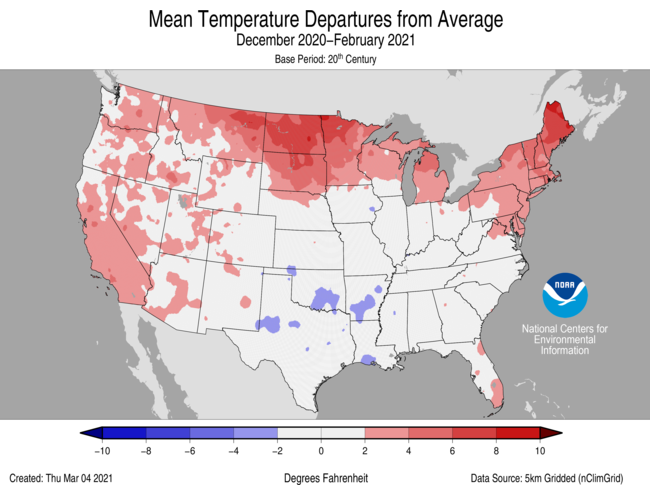
Average temperature anomalies in the United States during the 2020–21 winter.

January and the new year began with a storm system moving from the Gulf of Mexico to the Northeast on New Year's Eve and New Year's Day. It produced a swath of wintry weather extending over 2,000 miles, and the system also produced up to 2 feet (24 in) of snow and over 0.5 inches (13 mm) of ice in some areas. Later in the month, a storm originating in the Rocky Mountains produced a swath of wintry weather from New Mexico through Alabama, including areas such as Lubbock, Austin, Metro Houston, and Shreveport, some of which saw over 6 inches of snow accumulation. Towards the middle of the month, a blizzard impacted the Midwest and the interior Northeast, producing heavy snow and extremely gusty winds behind the system. During the last full week of January, a storm with winter weather spanning over 1,500 miles produced snowfall and mixed precipitation from the Midwest to the Northeast, as well as causing severe weather in the Southeast. It was shortly followed by a cold wave in the Northeast, in which wind chills dropped to as low as −25 °F (−32 °C) and that prompted an area of wind chill advisories. At the end of the month, a storm complex and atmospheric river event began to unfold in the Western United States, with snowfall totals as high as 100 inches (250 cm) and rainfall totals over a foot in many areas, causing widespread flooding and mudslides. The system later became a nor'easter bringing heavy and impactful snow to both coastal and interior areas of the Northeast, with both the Boston and New York City metropolitan areas seeing 18–24 inches (46–61 cm) of snow, in addition to causing over $1.8 billion in damages.

February began with a winter storm that moved through the Great Plains and Midwest, with heavy snow and blizzard-like conditions sparking a 40-vehicle pileup on Interstate 80 eastbound in Iowa, causing several serious injuries. It was followed just a few days later by a fast-moving nor'easter that brought moderate snowfall to the I-95 corridor on the day of Super Bowl LV. Then, a series of major winter storms blasted through the Western, Southern, and Eastern United States bringing heavy snow and ice. The first two storms were both major ice storms, with the first ice storm resulting in 12 fatalities and the second causing up to 1.5 in (38 mm) of freezing rain accretion. The next two storms were both Category 3 winter storms on the Regional Snowfall Index scale, with the first of the storms causing at least 237 fatalities and about $22.5 billion in damage, making it the costliest winter storm on record. The second storm caused at least 29 fatalities and resulted in over $2 billion in damage. The last two storms also resulted in a major power crisis in Texas. In total, the four back-to-back storms resulted in tens of billions of dollars in damage, over 250 fatalities, at least 14 million power outages, and a crisis in the Deep South. Simultaneous to the barrage of winter storms was a historic, long-lived outbreak of Arctic air in the Central United States. Temperatures 30-50 °F (17-28 °C) below average for prolonged periods from February 12–19 resulted in the entire month of February being significantly below average. The month ended with a minor snowstorm that affected areas such as Denver in the Rocky Mountains.

March began with a cold wave and windstorm in New England, which prompted wind chill warnings in four states and resulted in over 165,000 power outages. Later in the month, a historic and major blizzard impacted the Rocky Mountains with feet of snow, nearly breaking numerous all-time records, especially in the Denver and Cheyenne areas. It was also responsible for a major late-season snowstorm in the Midwest as well. It was shortly followed by another severe blizzard in the Southern Plains, resulting in near-zero visibility, major highways being stopped for hours, and several injuries. In mid-April, a fairly strong nor'easter moved up the East Coast, resulting in heavy snowfall accumulations in interior New England, as well as widespread lower totals closer to the coast.

== Events ==
There were several winter weather events during the 2020–21 North American winter. Significant events include cold waves, snowstorms, ice storms, blizzards, and other notable events outside the conventional limits of winter.

=== Late October ice storm ===
On October 27, a winter storm, unofficially named Winter Storm Billy by The Weather Channel, delivered heavy snow to Colorado, New Mexico, Western Texas, and Kansas, while a crippling ice storm hit Central Oklahoma, and Western North Texas including Oklahoma City. Ice accumulations were as high as 2 inches (51 mm) in areas of the Oklahoma City metropolitan area. The ice storm resulted in widespread tree damage and over 400,000 customers being put without power, 40,000 of whom remained out of power ten days later. It was one of the worst ice storms in Oklahoma City history, and the largest power outage in OG&E history. The Storm led to the United States's most extensive October snow cover since 1967. The ice storm is estimated to have caused over $125 million (2020 USD) in damage. There were also two deaths: one in Kansas and one in Texas.

=== Post-Tropical Cyclone Zeta ===
- Category 0 "Nuisance" (RSI/NOAA: N/A)
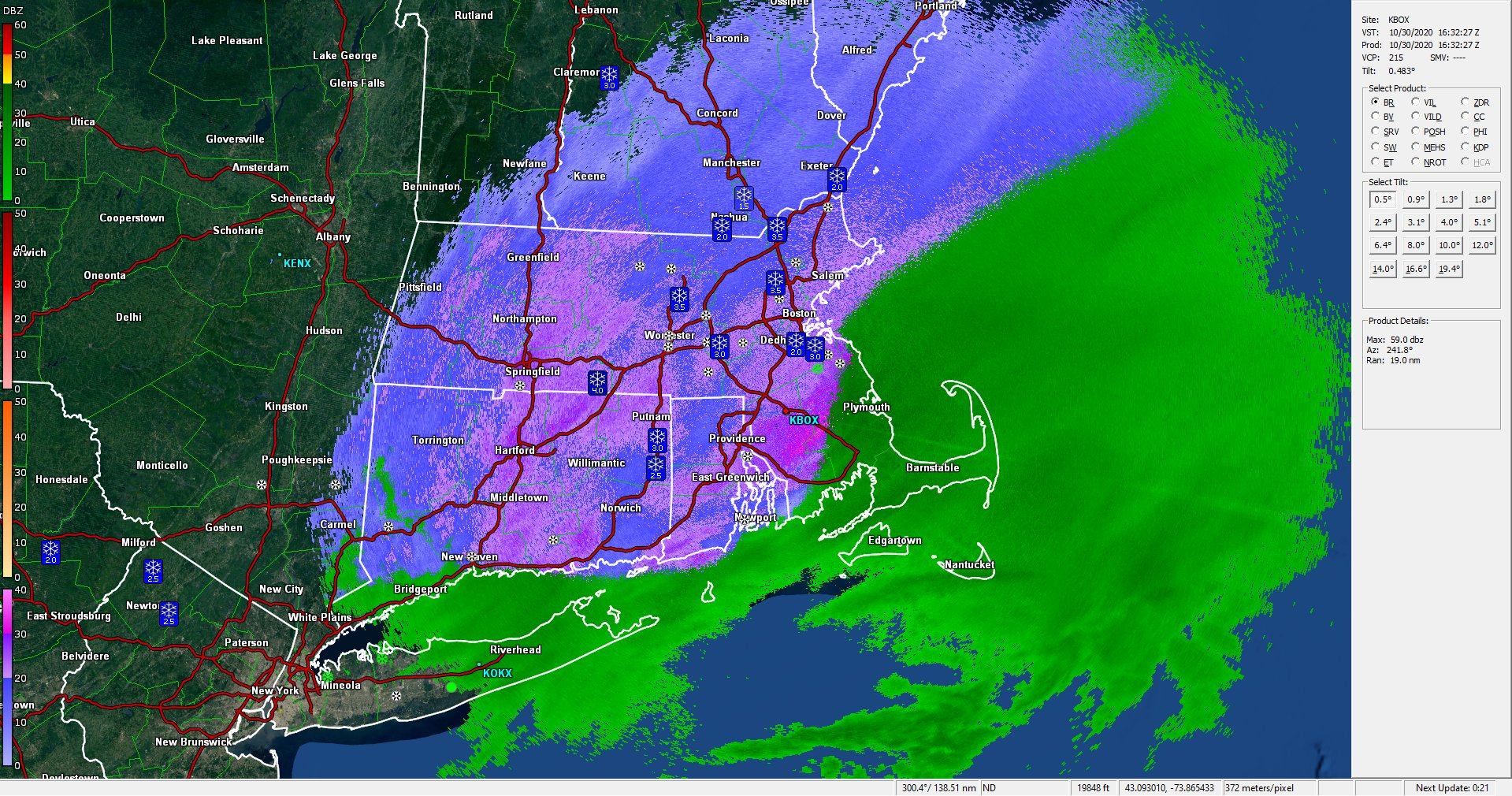
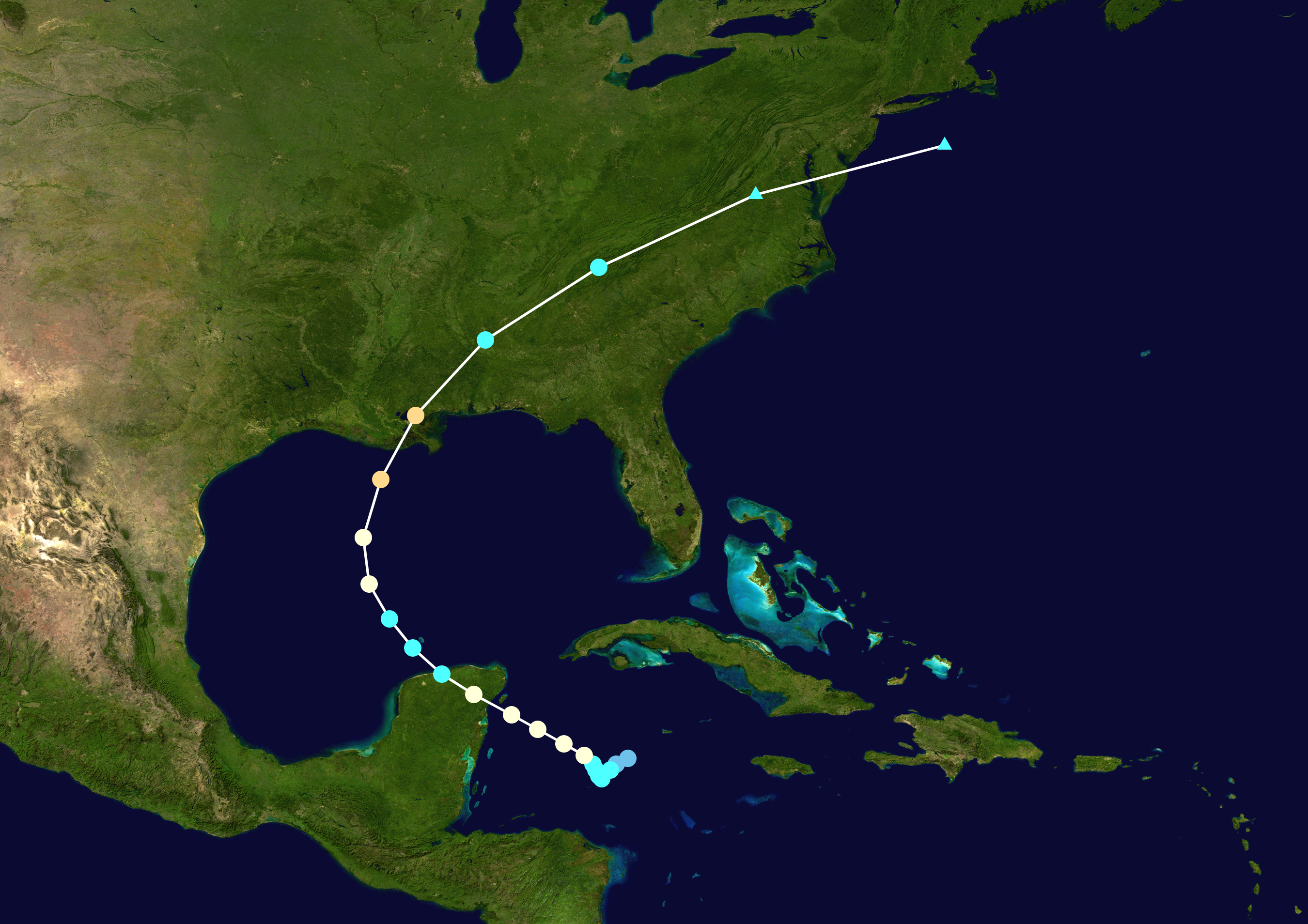
- Duration: October 29 – October 30, 2020
- Lowest pressure: 970 mb (28.64 inHg)
- Maximum snow: 6.5 in (17 cm)

The extratropical remnants of Hurricane Zeta combined with the previous winter storm to produce two separate snow events across parts of southern New England and upstate New York on October 29–30. The highest amount of accumulation was 6.5 inches (17 cm), which was recorded in Grafton, Massachusetts. This early-season snowstorm resulted in some downed tree branches in the region. The snowstorm also caused slippery road surfaces, leading to numerous crashes, some serious, in the state of Massachusetts. High wind in New York City caused a crane to damage the Steinway Building.

The cold front associated with Zeta dropped temperatures on the morning of October 31 to 19 °F (−7 °C) in Albany, New York, just one degree shy of the record. This is well below the typical low temperature of 35 °F (2 °C). Highs that day struggled to get into the 40s. Parts of New Jersey get as low as 20 °F (−7 °C) after Zeta dropped snow in the northern portion of the state, accumulating to 2.4 inches (6.1 cm) in High Point State Park.

=== Late November storm complex ===
- Category 0 "Nuisance" (RSI/NOAA: N/A)
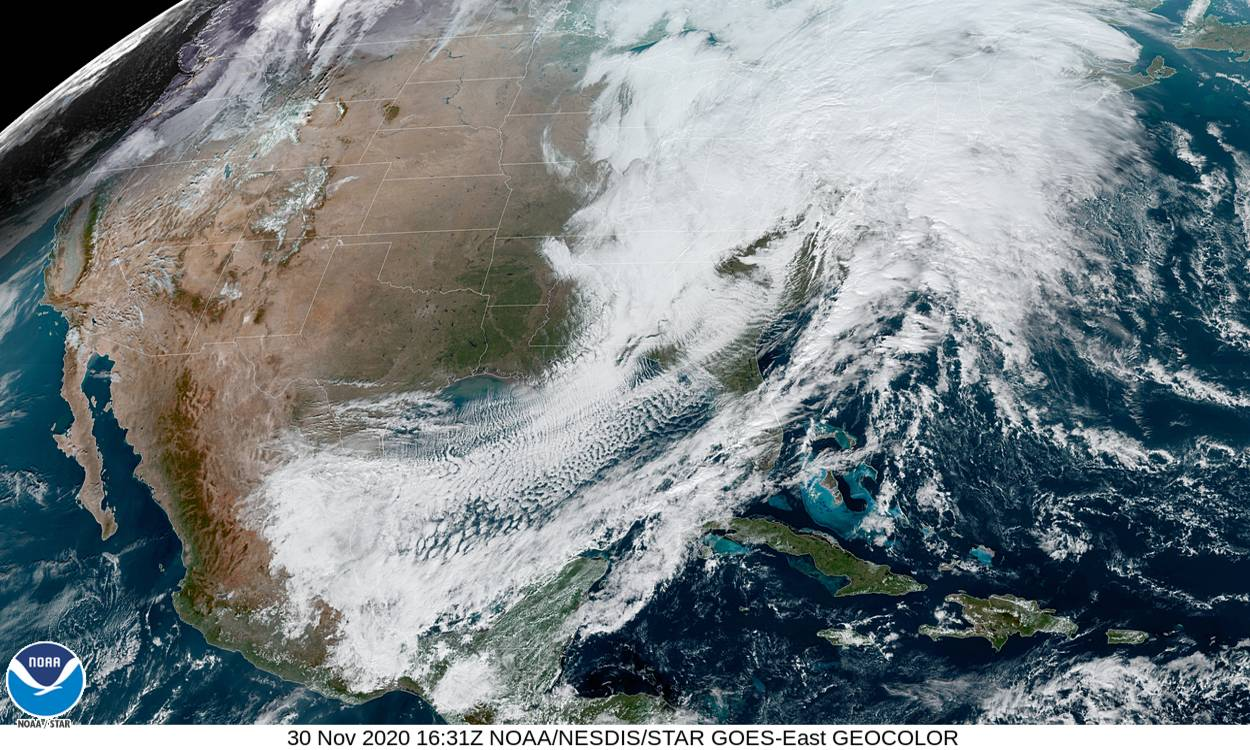
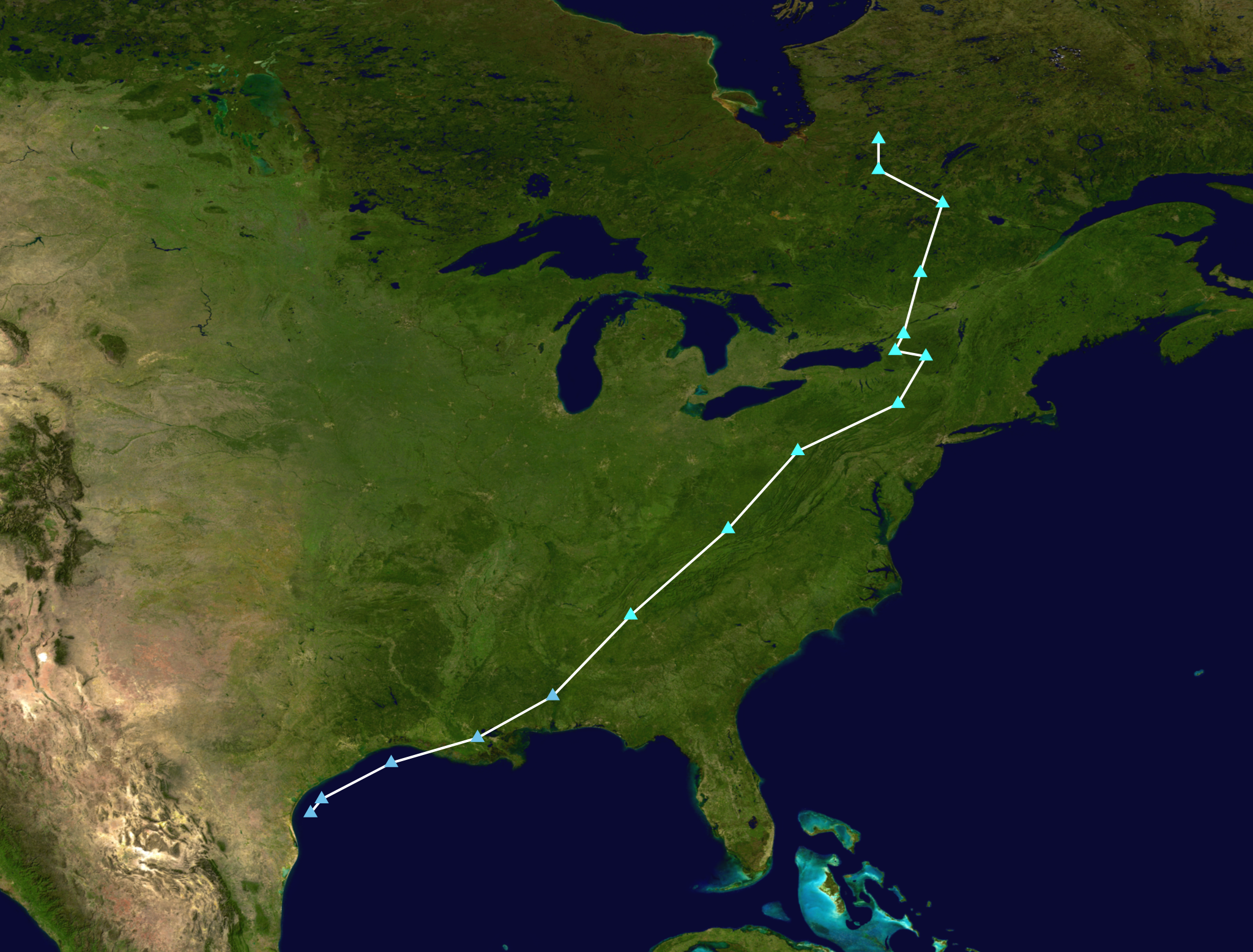
- Duration: November 29 – December 2, 2020
- Lowest pressure: 993 mb (29.32 inHg)
- Maximum snow: 24 in (61 cm)
- Damage: ≥ $100 million (2020 USD)

On November 29, two low pressure systems, one from the Gulf of Mexico and one from Canada, formed the low from the Gulf of Mexico. The southern system moved east then northeastward towards the Appalachian Mountains. The low from Canada came from Manitoba and moved southeastward towards the Great Lakes region. On November 30, snowfall was recorded in cities such as Toledo, Detroit, Chicago, and Cleveland. The next day on December 1 snowfall started in Pittsburgh. The system also produced heavy rainfall, high winds, and several weak tornadoes to the East Coast. It is estimated to have caused at least $100 million (2020 USD) in damage.

=== December nor'easters ===
==== Early December nor'easter ====
- Category 0 "Nuisance" (RSI/NOAA: N/A)
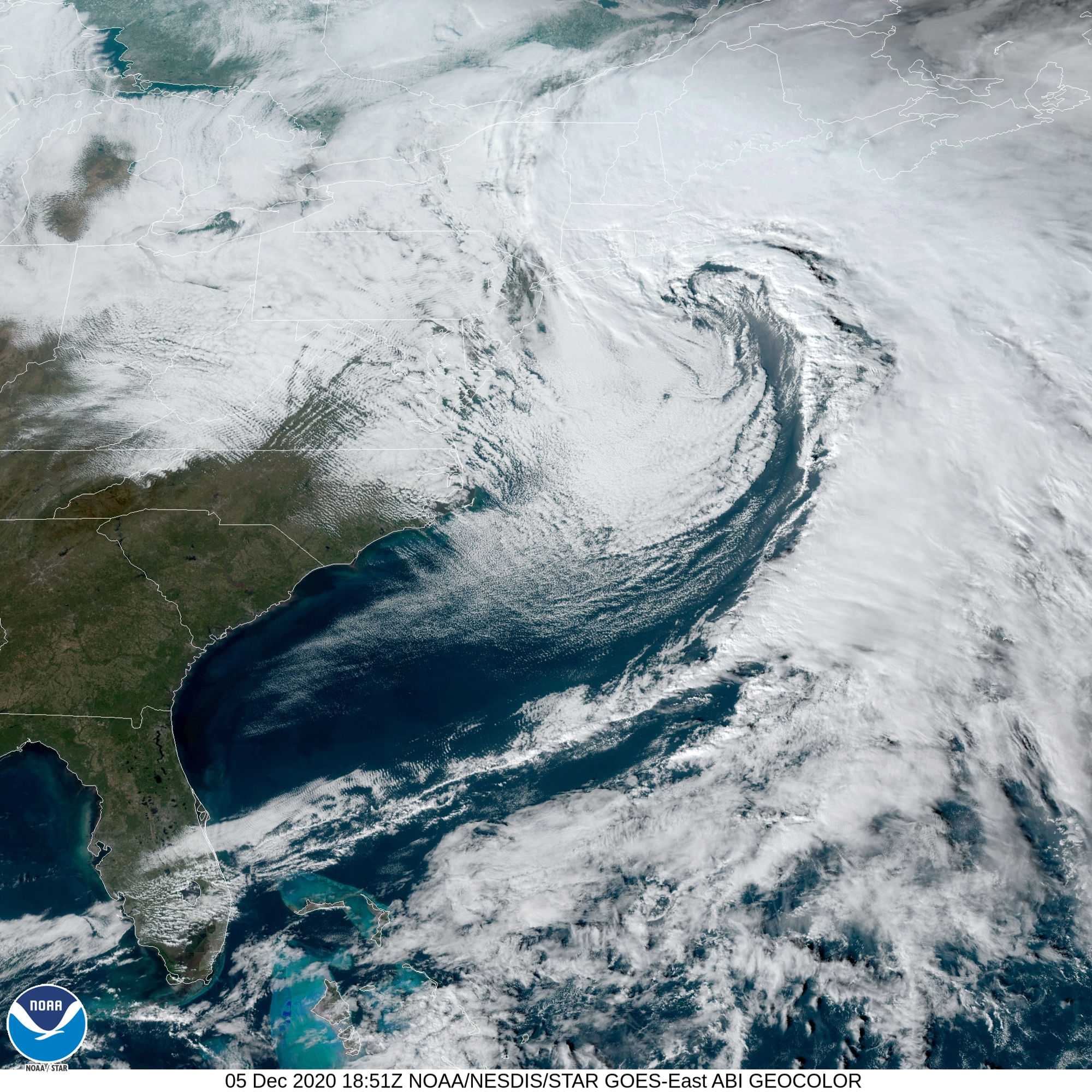
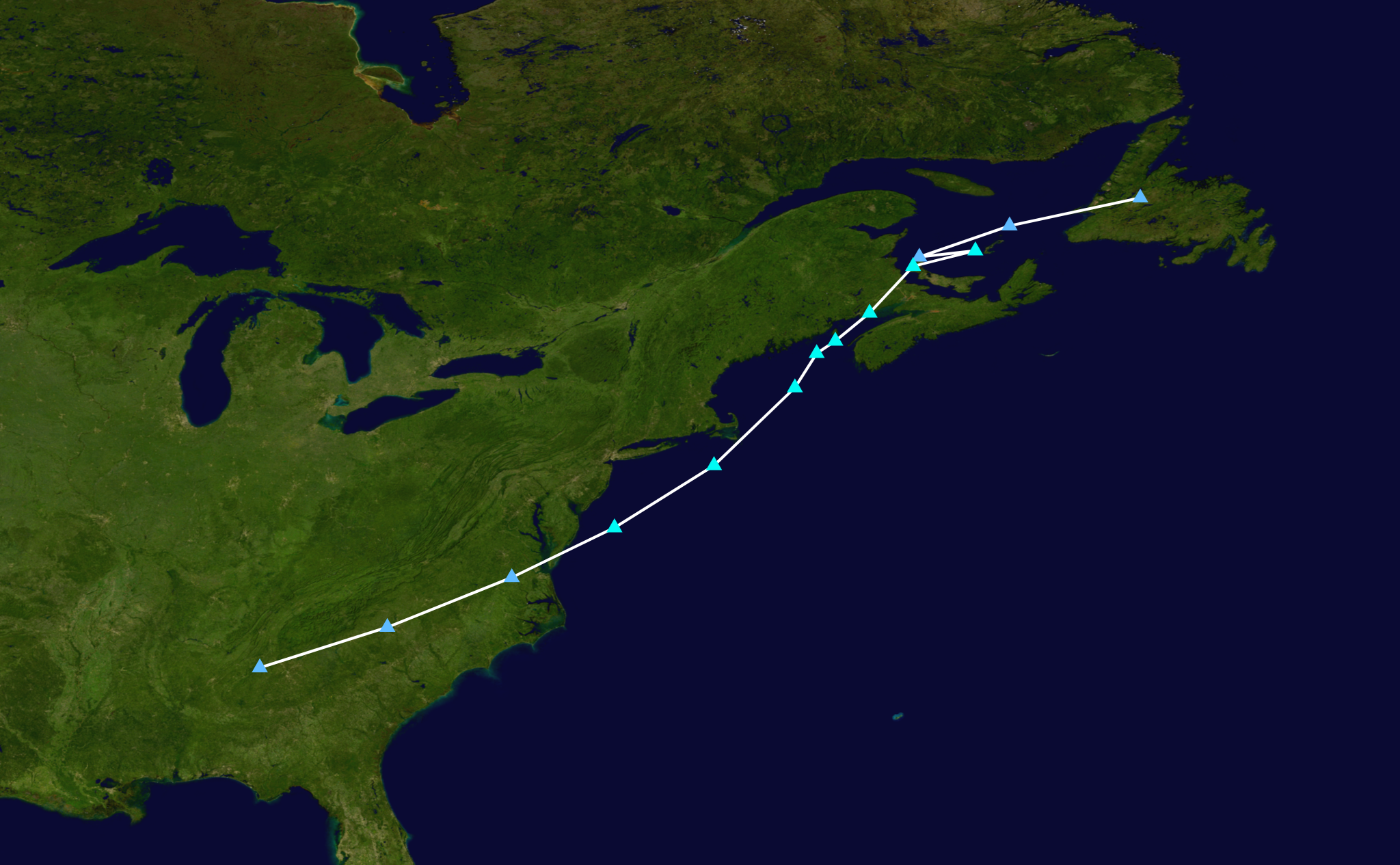
- Duration: December 4 – December 6, 2020
- Lowest pressure: 976 mb (28.82 inHg)
- Maximum snow: 18 in (46 cm)
- Damage: ≥ $25 million (2020 USD)

On December 4, a nor'easter developed from an area of low pressure moving off the Mid-Atlantic coast and began to rapidly intensify. Ahead of the storm, Winter Storm Warnings were issued in a swath from the northern parts of Connecticut and Rhode Island to Maine's border with Canada. On December 5, the nor'easter made landfall in coastal New England while brushing the coastline. Precipitation initially began as heavy rain but as the storm progressed northward, heavy wet snow broke out in Massachusetts, New Hampshire and Maine, resulting in over 280,000 customers without power. 12.5 inches (32 cm) of snow fell in Paxton, Massachusetts, and areas in Maine saw up to 18 inches (46 cm) of snow. By midday December 6, only flurries lingered over the Northeast, as the storm was moving deeper into Eastern Canada. The nor'easter is estimated to have caused at least $25 million (2021 USD) in damage.

==== Mid-December nor'easter ====
- Category 2 "Significant" (RSI/NOAA: 5.58)
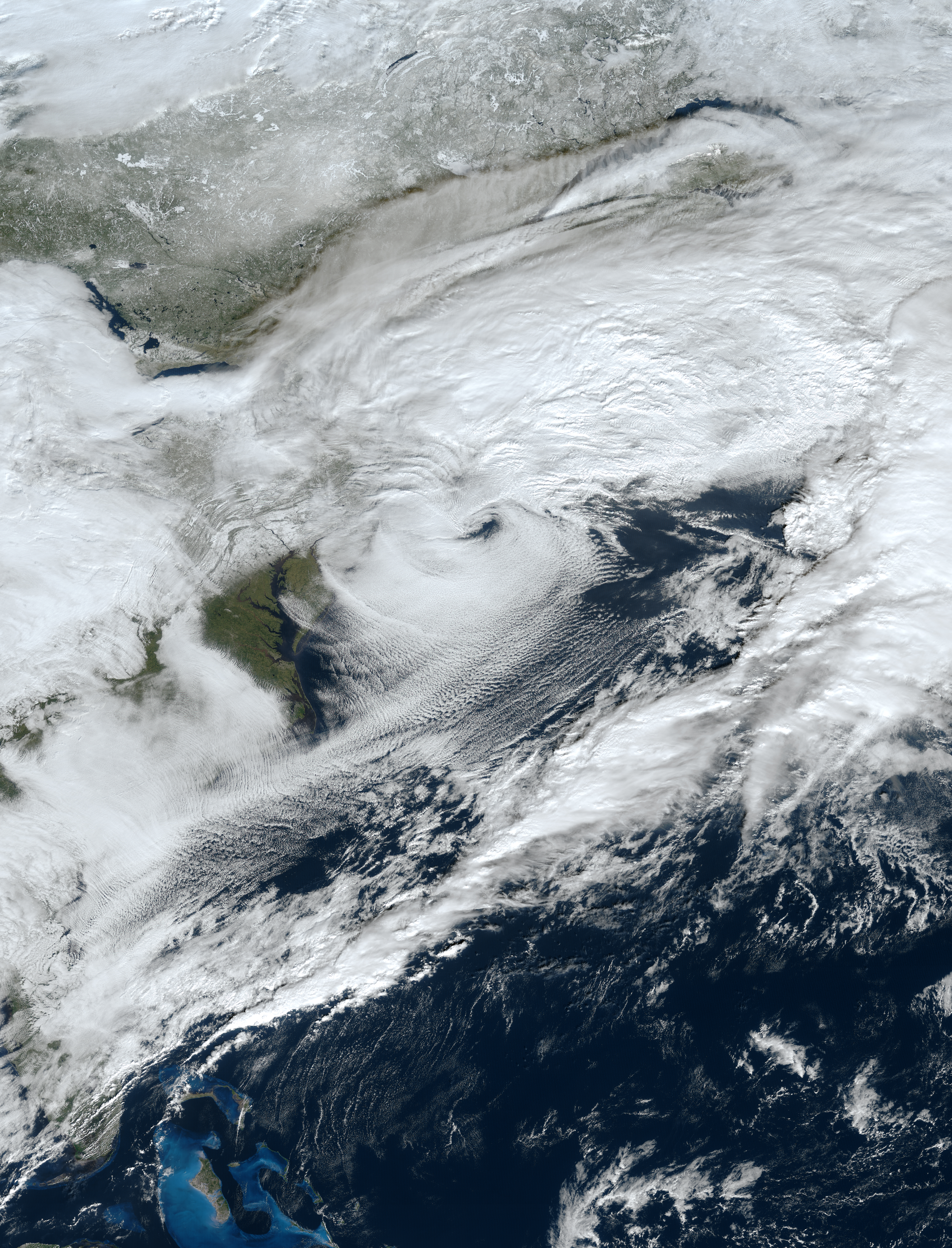
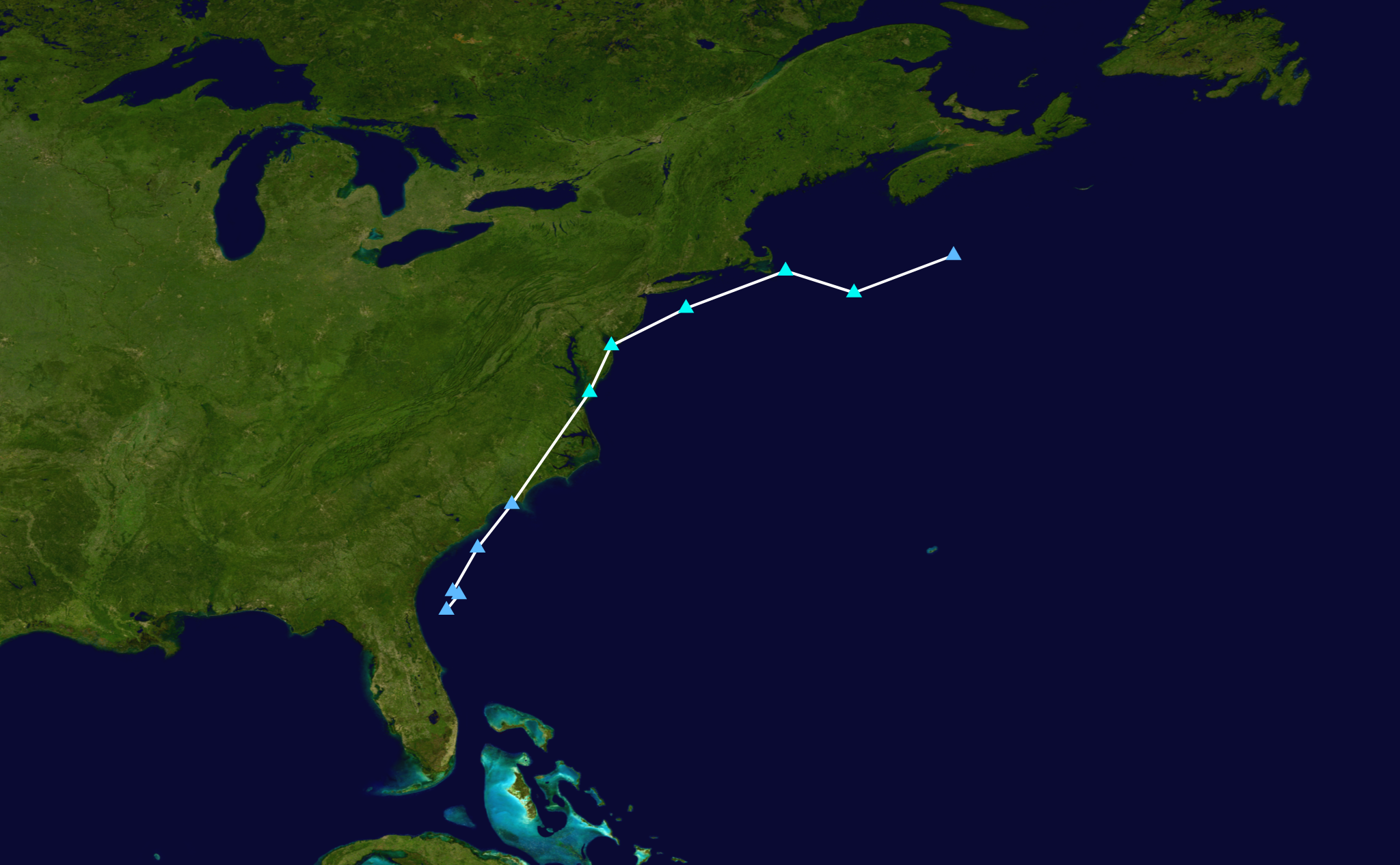
- Duration: December 14 – December 18, 2020
- Lowest pressure: 995 mb (29.38 inHg)
- Maximum snow: 44 in (110 cm)
- Fatalities: 7 fatalities
- Damage: ≥ $125 million (2020 USD)

On December 16, a second major nor'easter began affecting parts of New England and the Mid-Atlantic. The storm was described as a "blockbuster storm" by AccuWeather. The nor'easter formed on December 16 and continued affect the Northeast into the 17th. A swath of 12–18+ inches of snow extended from central Pennsylvania through most of southern New England. Locally, up to 44 inches (110 cm) of snow fell in Newark Valley, New York and 45 inches (110 cm) fell in Ludlow, where a new state record may have been broken. In nearby Pennsylvania, the 24-hour snowfall record of 38 inches (97 cm) was threatened. Williamsport and Binghamton both saw their largest snowstorms on record. Snowfall rates in the latter reached 5 inches (13 cm) per hour at the peak of the storm. Coastal Massachusetts experienced high winds, exceeding 60 mph in gusts, along with the snowfall, causing significant blowing snow.

Major cities saw much less but still disruptive amounts of snow, including amounts in Washington D.C. (2.3 inches (5.8 cm), Philadelphia (6.3 inches (16 cm), New York City (10.5 inches (27 cm), Pittsburgh (11.5 inches (29 cm), and Boston (12.7 inches (32 cm), ending a 1,000+ day high-impact snowstorm drought in the Mid-Atlantic and coastal New England regions. More than 70 million people were affected throughout the Northeast. The nor'easter also caused significant impacts in Atlantic Canada; schools, government offices, public parks and recreation programs in the city of Halifax, Nova Scotia all had delayed openings or closures on December 18. It is estimated to have caused at least $125 million (2021 USD) in damage.

=== Christmas Week blizzard ===
A powerful blizzard began impacting the Upper Midwest starting on December 23, disrupting travel ahead of Christmas. A pileup occurred on Interstate 29 in South Dakota, implicating 20 vehicles and injuring a few people. 298 flights were cancelled and another 46 delayed at Minneapolis-St. Paul International Airport. Strong winds, gusting up to 68 mph, left 10,000 customers without power in Minnesota. Almost zero visibility was reported on highways in South Dakota, Minnesota, and Nebraska, as Highway Patrol warned people to stay off the roads. Locations in far northern Minnesota and Wisconsin accumulated over a foot of snow. The storm system responsible for the blizzard also brought severe weather to the East Coast; the Storm Prediction Center issued an "Enhanced" risk of severe weather for eastern North Carolina and nearby portions of South Carolina and Virginia on December 24. Five tornadoes were reported in the Southeastern U.S. on December 23; another one was reported as well on December 24, and non-tornadic wind damage was reported across several states. Flooding on the Delaware River forced the National Park Service to block off all access to the river from within the Delaware Water Gap National Recreation Area. In New York City, temperatures early morning on Christmas rise to 60 °F (16 °C) as the storm moves in with high winds, gusting up to 67 miles per hour (108 km/h). After the storm moved through, temperatures dropped rapidly, hitting 49 °F (9 °C) by noon, and 32 °F (0 °C) by midnight. During the storm, Burlington, VT set a record high for Christmas at 65 °F (18 °C). Some spots in northern New England saw higher temperatures on Christmas then the 4th of July weekend in 2021. In total, the blizzard is estimated to have caused at least $340 million (2021 USD) in damages.

=== Late December Bering Sea cyclone ===
In late December, an extremely powerful extratropical cyclone developed in the far Northern Pacific Ocean, and explosively deepened late on December 30–31 as it neared the Bering Sea. According to the Ocean Prediction Center's analysis, the cyclone achieved a minimum pressure of 921 mb (27.2 inHg) at 12:00 UTC on December 31, which was the lowest pressure ever observed within the Bering Sea since a similar cyclone in November 2014 spawned by the remnants of Typhoon Nuri. Hurricane force wind warnings were issued for parts of the Aleutian Islands as well.

=== New Year's winter storm ===
- Category 1 "Notable" (RSI/NOAA: 1.788)
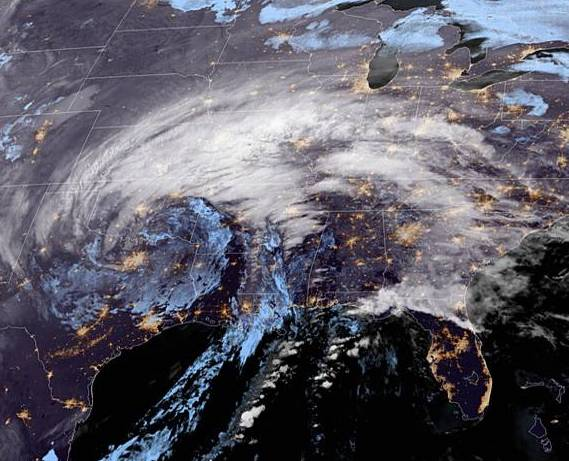
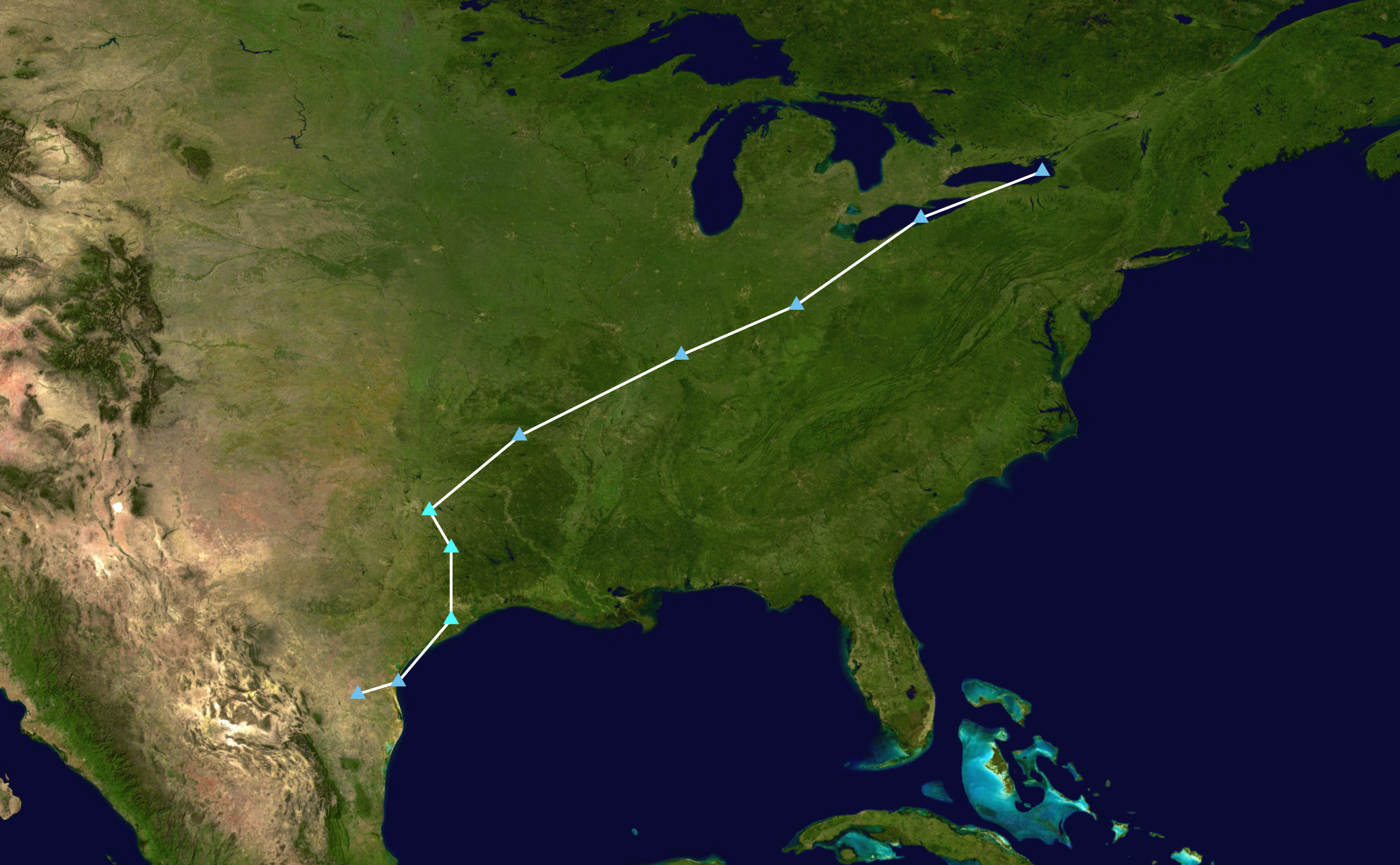
- Duration: December 30, 2020 – January 3, 2021
- Lowest pressure: 1001 mb (29.56 inHg)
- Maximum snow: 24 in (61 cm)
- Fatalities: 3 fatalities
- Damage: ≥ $35 million (2021 USD)

An upper-level low formed in the Gulf of Mexico and came ashore on December 30–31, and snow, freezing rain and sleet began to fall on December 30, prompting winter storm warnings across the West Texas region and extending into Oklahoma. The unusual severity of the winter weather led to the closure of Interstate 10, which stranded dozens of travelers that had to seek shelter in two school gyms in Marfa. Peak accumulations in Texas reached 24 inches (61 cm) in Big Bend National Park.

The storm system continued moving Northeastward and brought 5.1 and 6.5 inches to Oklahoma City and Witchita, Kansas respectively. Nearly half an inch of ice accumulated in parts of Illinois and Pennsylvania. Along the Canadian border with Upstate New York and Vermont, up to 7 inches of snow fell. The swath of wintry weather extended over 2,200 miles. The storm complex is estimated to have caused at least $35 million (2021 USD) in damage.

=== Mid-January blizzard ===
On January 12, a low pressure came ashore in the Pacific Northwest, causing heavy rain, mountain snow, and damaging winds in much of Washington, Oregon and British Columbia. The next day, the system caused a damaging windstorm just east of the Rocky Mountains, with gusts of up to 125 mph (201 km/h) in some areas. It then moved into the Great Plains and Upper Midwest, bringing damaging winds along with heavy snow, prompting Winter Storm and Blizzard Warnings in many of those areas. The surface low pressure later moved into the Upper Midwest, bringing blustery conditions and snow to much of the area. The low pressure stalled on January 15, and blizzard conditions continued in parts of the Upper Midwest. Winter Weather Advisories and Winter Storm Watches were issued in portions of the interior Northeast, in anticipation of the storm moving there next. Later, Winter Storm Watches in the Northeast were upgraded to Winter Storm Warnings as the storm moved into the Northeast. The precipitation was generally all rain along the coast, but interior sections saw some snow from the system. Major Canadian cities such as Ottawa, Montreal, and Quebec City saw over 20 cm (7.9 in) of heavy wet snow on January 15–17, causing 46,000 customers to lose power in Quebec. It is estimated to have caused at least $525 million (2021 USD) in damage.

=== Late January winter storm & cold wave ===
On January 25, snow began accumulating in portions of Nebraska and Iowa as a winter storm began developing and traveling east. Winter Storm Warnings went into effect for counties in Iowa and northern Illinois. The storm lasted into the following day, having reached a maximum size of around 1,500 miles (2,400 kilometres) from east to west. Parts of the Midwest saw more than one foot of snow, while mixed precipitation occurred in the Ohio Valley and Northeast. Des Moines International Airport recorded 10.3 inches (26 cm) of snowfall on Monday. Several schools and districts in central Iowa cancelled classes or started them late on Tuesday morning, while the Des Moines Public Schools district held classes virtually. Overnight, the storm also caused severe weather in the Southeast, including a tornado in Fultondale, Alabama which killed one person and injured many others. It also caused many power outages and widespread damage north of Birmingham, Alabama. On January 26, snow and ice began moving into the Northeast, and began becoming more widespread as the day progressed. Winter Storm Warnings were put into effect for portions of southern Pennsylvania and western Maryland. In New York, only Oneida County was put under a winter storm warning, which is unusual as usually winter storm warnings are issued for multiple counties, not just one. The winter storm is estimated to have caused at least $120 million (2021 USD) in damages.

On January 28, following the storm, an Arctic air outbreak began to take shape in southern Canada, and the next day the cold air reached New England. Wind chill advisories were issued in northern and central New England, as well as in upstate New York. Wind chills ranged from −10 °F (−23 °C) to −25 °F (−32 °C) in many of these areas during the morning of January 29. Actual high temperatures failed to reach 20 °F (−7 °C) in many areas in New England and upstate New York, with wind chill highs barely reaching 0 °F (−18 °C). The cold air lingered into the night, with wind chill advisories being issued once again in many areas. In Rochester, the low on January 30 was 3 °F (−16 °C), after a high of 17 °F (−8 °C) the day before.

=== Late January–early February nor'easters ===
==== Groundhog Day nor'easter ====
- Category 3 "Major" (RSI/NOAA: 6.188)
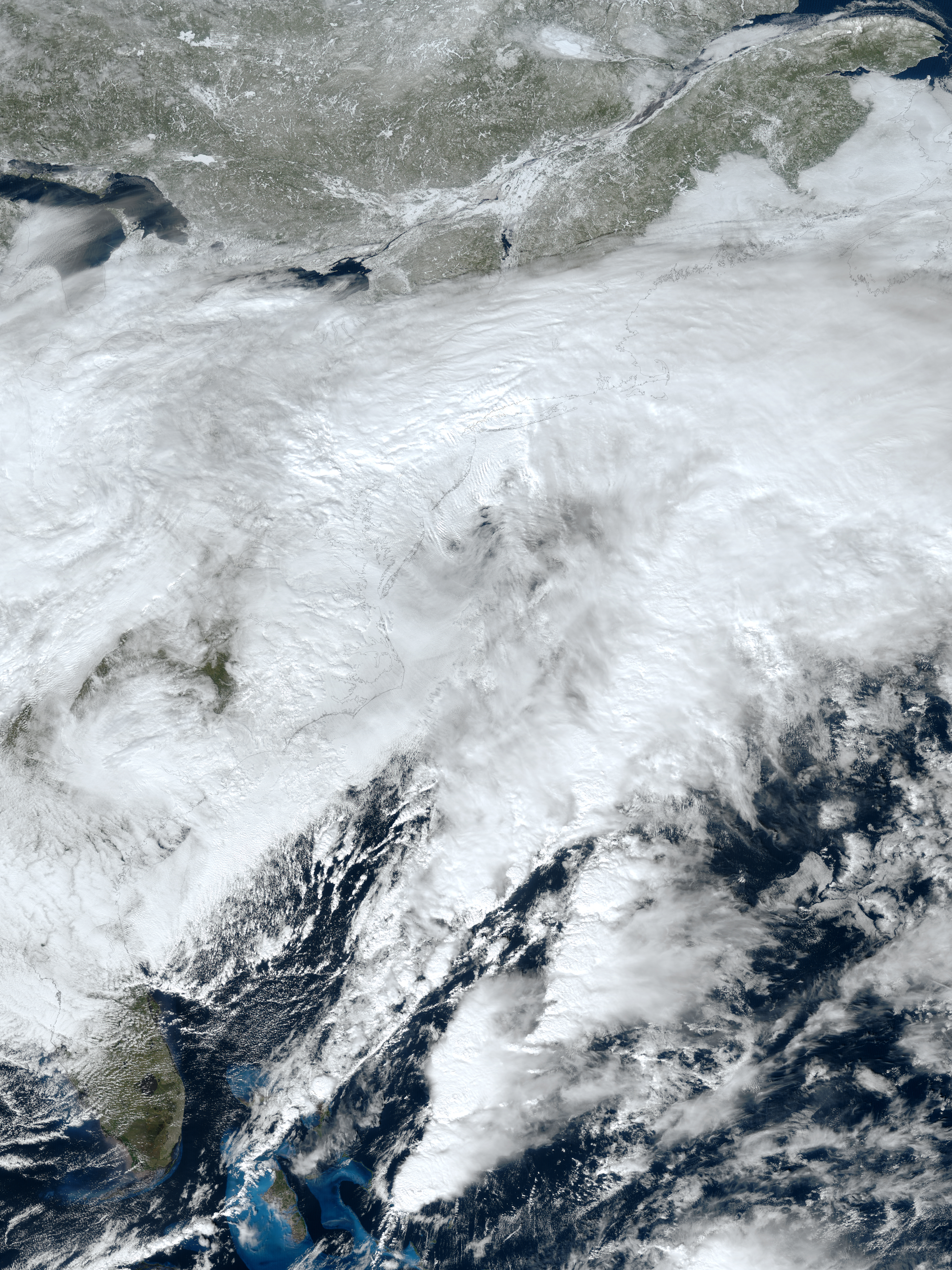
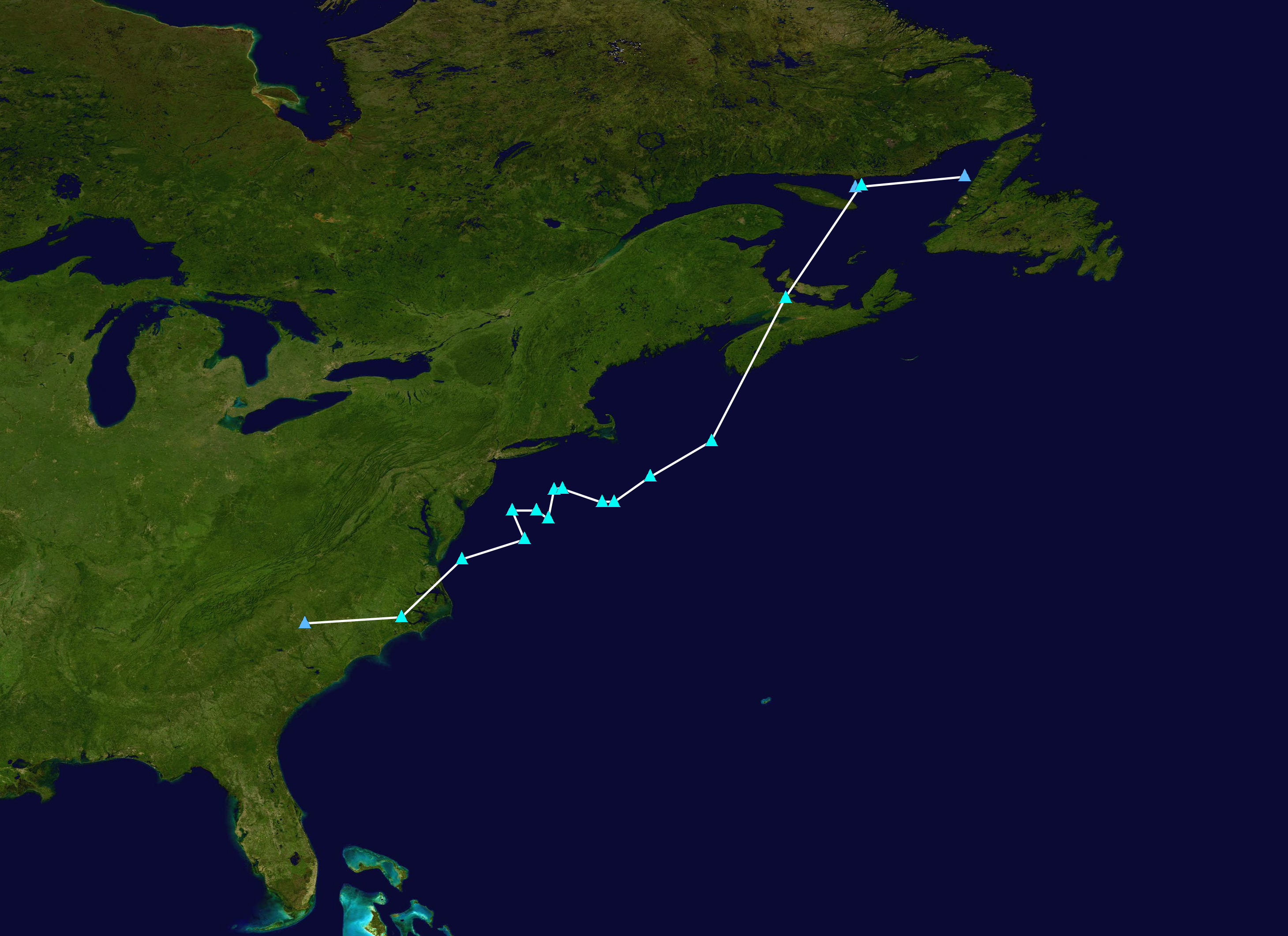
- Duration: January 25 – February 4, 2021
- Lowest pressure: 984 mb (29.06 inHg)
- Maximum snow: 107 in (270 cm)
- Fatalities: 7 fatalities
- Damage: ≥ $1.85 billion (2021 USD)

Following a series of weaker winter storms impacting the United States, another arrived on the West Coast. The night of January 26 into January 27, Northern California experienced extreme wind gusts, peaking at 125 mph (201 km/h) near Alpine Meadows. The winds downed trees onto powerlines and homes, causing >400,000 customers to lose power. Additionally, the storm caused an atmospheric river event over parts of the state still recovering from burn scars due to the previous wildfire season, causing several mudslides, one of which destroyed a portion of Highway 1. The combination of extreme winds and extremely intense precipitation caused blizzard conditions near Weed. Once the storm system began to move inland, Winter Storm Watches were issued in some areas of the Midwest and Ohio Valley. 12.9 inches of snow fell in Romeoville. Also, 10.8 and 11.3 inches of snow fell at O'Hare and Midway airports respectively. Nearby, 8 to 10 inches fell in the Milwaukee metro area and 13.5 inches fell in northern Indiana.

Shortly thereafter, the storm developed into a nor'easter and began moving up the coast slowly, dumping excessive amounts of snow on the I-95 corridor. 4.5 inches of snow fell in D.C., 5.2 inches in Baltimore, 7.8 inches in Philadelphia, 18.2 inches in Newark, New Jersey, 17.2 inches in Central Park, New York, 15.2 inches in New Haven, and 24 inches in Lowell, Massachusetts. The highest snowfall total from the nor'easter phase of the storm was 36.1 inches in Nazareth, Pennsylvania. The system is estimated to have caused over $1.85 billion in damage.

==== Super Bowl Sunday nor'easter ====
- Category 0 "Nuisance" (RSI/NOAA: N/A)
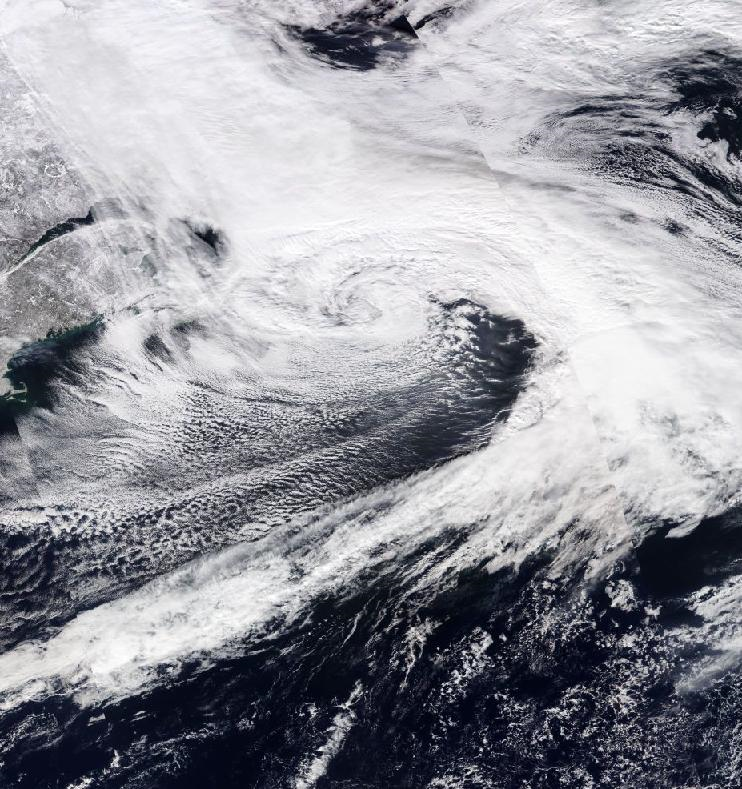
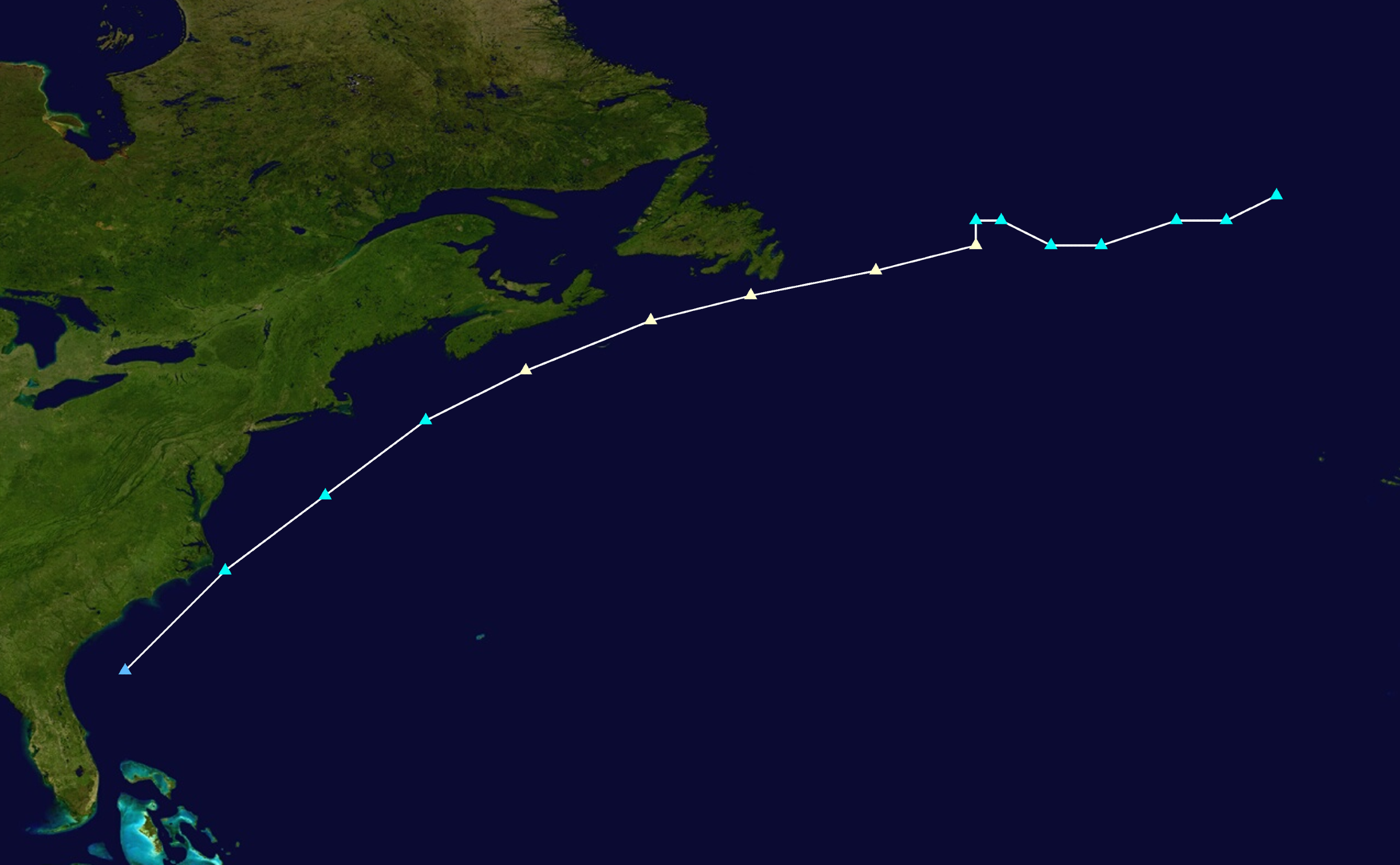
- Duration: February 6 – February 8, 2021
- Lowest pressure: 960 mb (28.35 inHg)
- Maximum snow: 20 in (51 cm)
- Fatalities: 1 fatalities

Another nor'easter began taking shape late on February 6 in the form of a low pressure system off the coast of South Carolina. Ahead of the storm, winter storm warnings were issued from Georgia to Massachusetts. Snow broke out in interior portions of the Carolinas and Virginia; Saluda, North Carolina and Wise, Virginia picked up 6.3 and 8 inches respectively. Then the storm's effects moved up into the I-95 corridor, where totals exceeding 6 inches were widespread. 9.1 inches was reported near Westwood, New Jersey, 6.5 inches at JFK International Airport, 8 and 7.4 inches at North Haven and Bridgeport Airport in Connecticut, 14 inches at Pascoag, Rhode Island and 12 inches in Norfolk, Massachusetts. Afterwards, the storm affected Atlantic Canada, where up to 50 cm of snow fell in Halifax. As a result, across the entire region, public transportation was shut down, government offices and schools were closed, postal services were delayed and the regular ferry crossing service in the Cabot Channel was suspended.

=== February cold wave ===
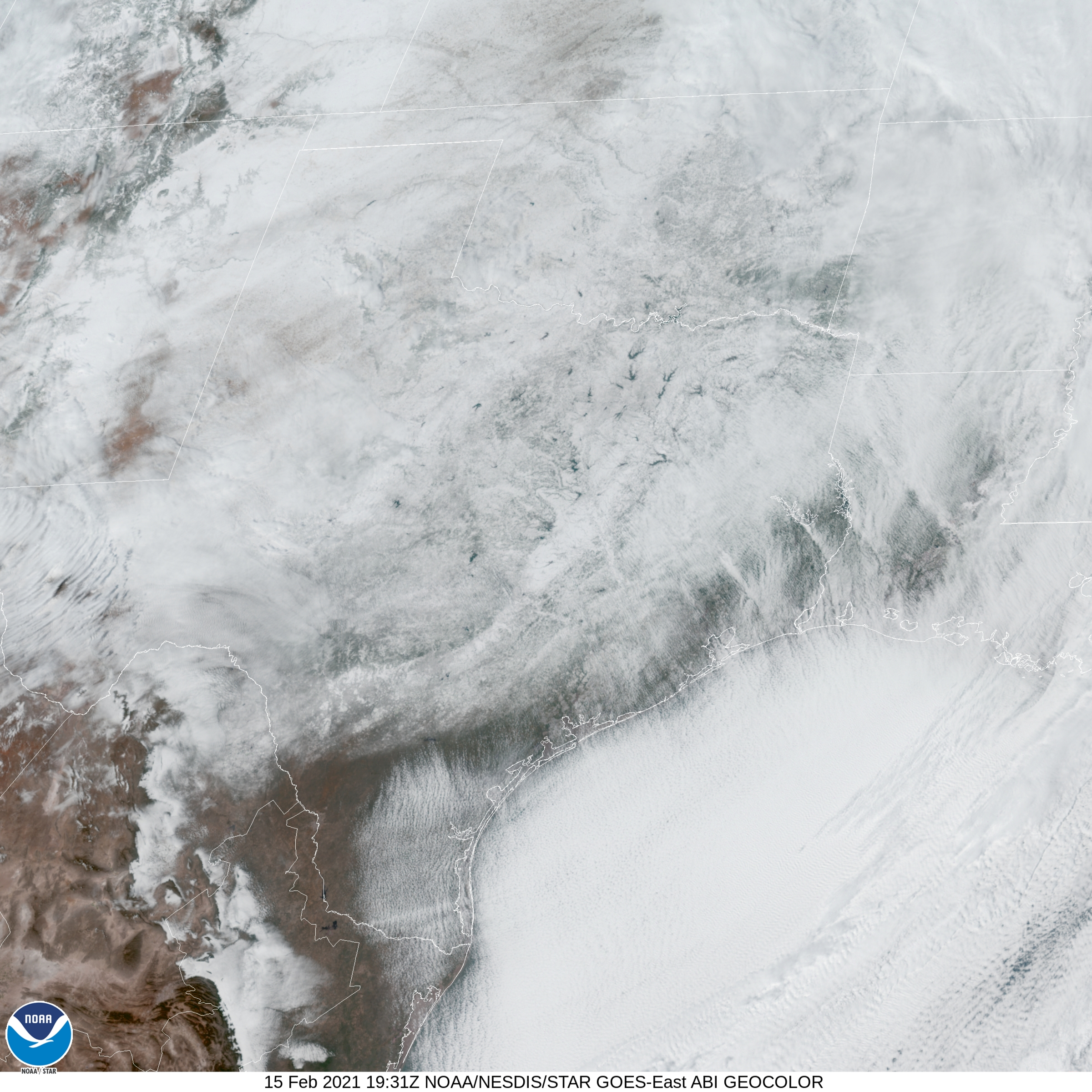
Snow across the south-central United States on February 15

Wind chill advisories and wind chill warnings were issued from eastern Montana into Wisconsin and all the way to northern Illinois in early February. On February 7, in International Falls, Minnesota, the wind chill was −46 °C (−51 °F) early in the day and the following morning, the actual temperature fell to −40 °F (−40 °C) in Ash Lake, Minnesota. Meanwhile, in British Columbia, Canada, a woman in Dawson Creek, where the temperature was −42.2 °C (−44.0 °F) at the time, died of prolonged exposure to the cold. The following week widespread record-challenging cold remained in place over central parts of Canada and the United States. Canada recorded its coldest temperature since 2017; −51.9 °C (−61.4 °F) in Wekweeti, Northwest Territories. In Livingston, Montana, the daily cold record for February 13 was broken and temperatures fell to −28 °F (−33 °C) there.

The cold later spread southwards to areas such as Texas, where temperatures reached 0 °F (−18 °C) in parts of the state on February 14. Some parts of the state experienced temperatures over 50 °F below normal. Records from over a century were broken: on February 16, daily record lows were broken in Oklahoma City (−14 °F [−26 °C], coldest since 1899 and the second-coldest on record), Dallas (−2 °F [−19 °C], coldest since 1930 and the second-coldest on record), Houston (13 °F [−11 °C], coldest since 1989), San Antonio (12 °F [−11 °C], coldest since 1989) and Little Rock (−1 °F [−18 °C], coldest since 1989), with all-time low temperatures being set in Fayetteville, Arkansas (−20 °F [−29 °C]) and Hastings, Nebraska (−30 °F [−34 °C]). This put a strain on the state's power grid, resulting in the Southwest Power Pool and the Electric Reliability Council of Texas both instituting rolling blackouts.

=== Mid-February winter storms ===
==== February 10–12 and 11–14 ice storms ====
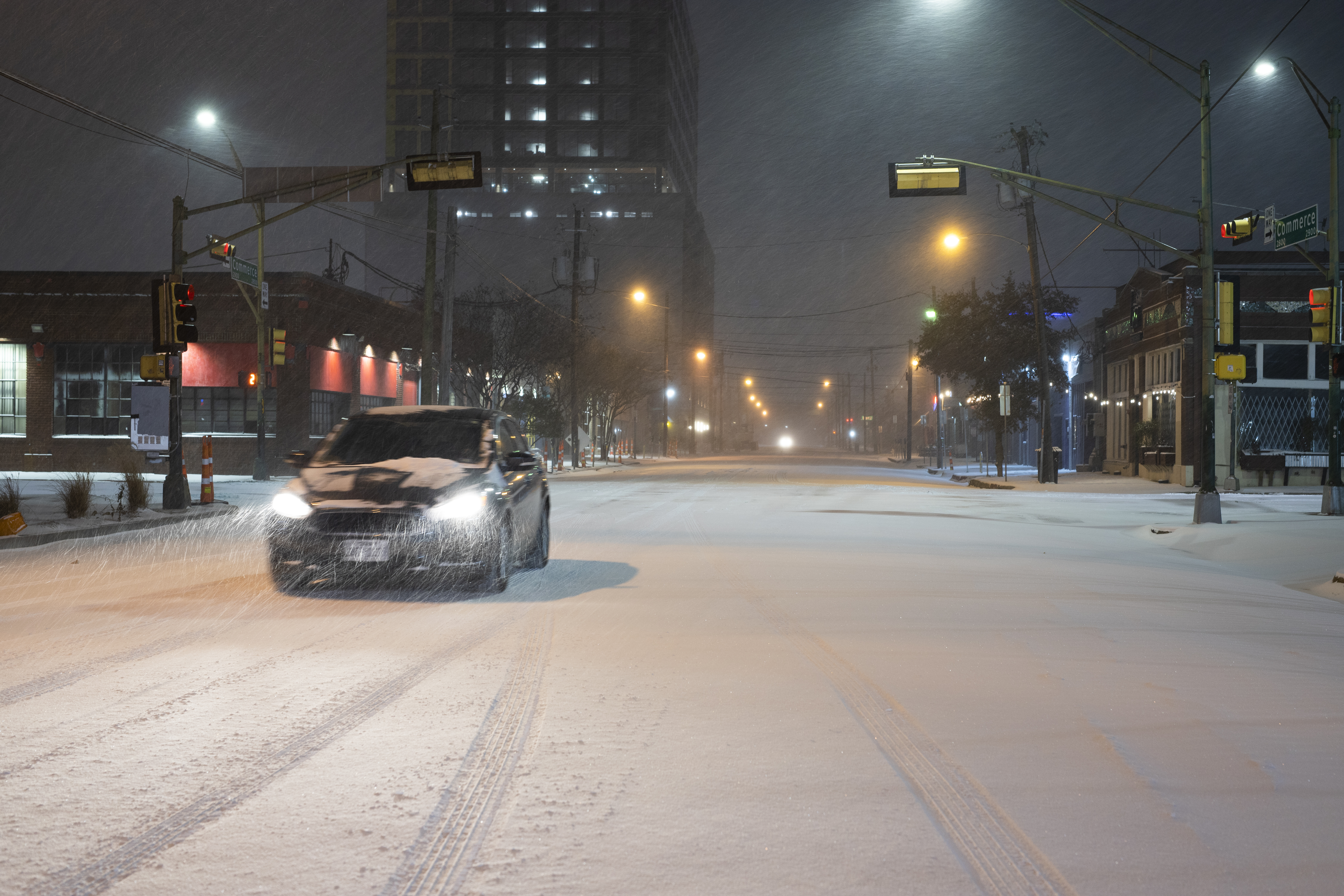
Snow falling in Dallas early on February 15

On February 10, an ice storm began impacting states in the Ohio Valley region as well as the Upland South. In Louisville, road crews and utility workers began preparing for a major ice storm on February 8. The City of Louisville Department of Public Works began preparing for a mass pre-treatment of the roads in the area, getting thousands of tons of salt and brine ready. Over 200 snow and ice removal vehicles were prepared to be treating the roads during the storm. Utility workers began preparing to work for many hours fixing the power due to outages from snow and ice. Two people were killed in car accidents in Kentucky. On February 10, Delta Air Lines flight 2231 slid off a taxiway prior to takeoff due to ice accumulations at Pittsburgh International Airport, although there were no casualties. On the early morning of February 11, 2021, due to the frigid weather, Interstate 35W in Fort Worth, Texas was icy, which was unusual for the area. As a result, at 6:30 AM CST the first collision occurred when a vehicle skidded off the road, which led to several vehicles, including semi-trucks, to pile up on the freeway. Ultimately, 133 cars piled in the incident which left motorists trapped in their vehicles. Six people died and sixty-five people were transported to a local hospital. The National Transportation Safety Board performed a safety investigation of the crash, and released a report on January 18, 2023. The storm is estimated to have caused over $75 million (2021 USD) in damages.

From February 11–12, the next storm brought light to moderate snow to the Rocky Mountains. Then, energy from that storm later caused a significant icing event in the Mid-Atlantic and Appalachians. From Kentucky to North Carolina, 480,000 customers were left without power. Additionally, downed trees and powerlines caused significant disruption in Virginia, where a winter weather state of emergency was placed into effect. The first ever ice storm warning was issued for the Greater Richmond Region as well. The 6.1 in (15 cm) of snowfall in Portland, Oregon on February 12 ties the airport monthly record of 6.1 in (15 cm) set Feb 19, 1993. The event proved to be historic for the Portland metropolitan area in the month of February. Some areas in Oregon saw up to 1.5 in (38 mm) of ice accretion.

==== February 13–17 winter storm ====
- Category 3 "Major" (RSI/NOAA: 8.048)
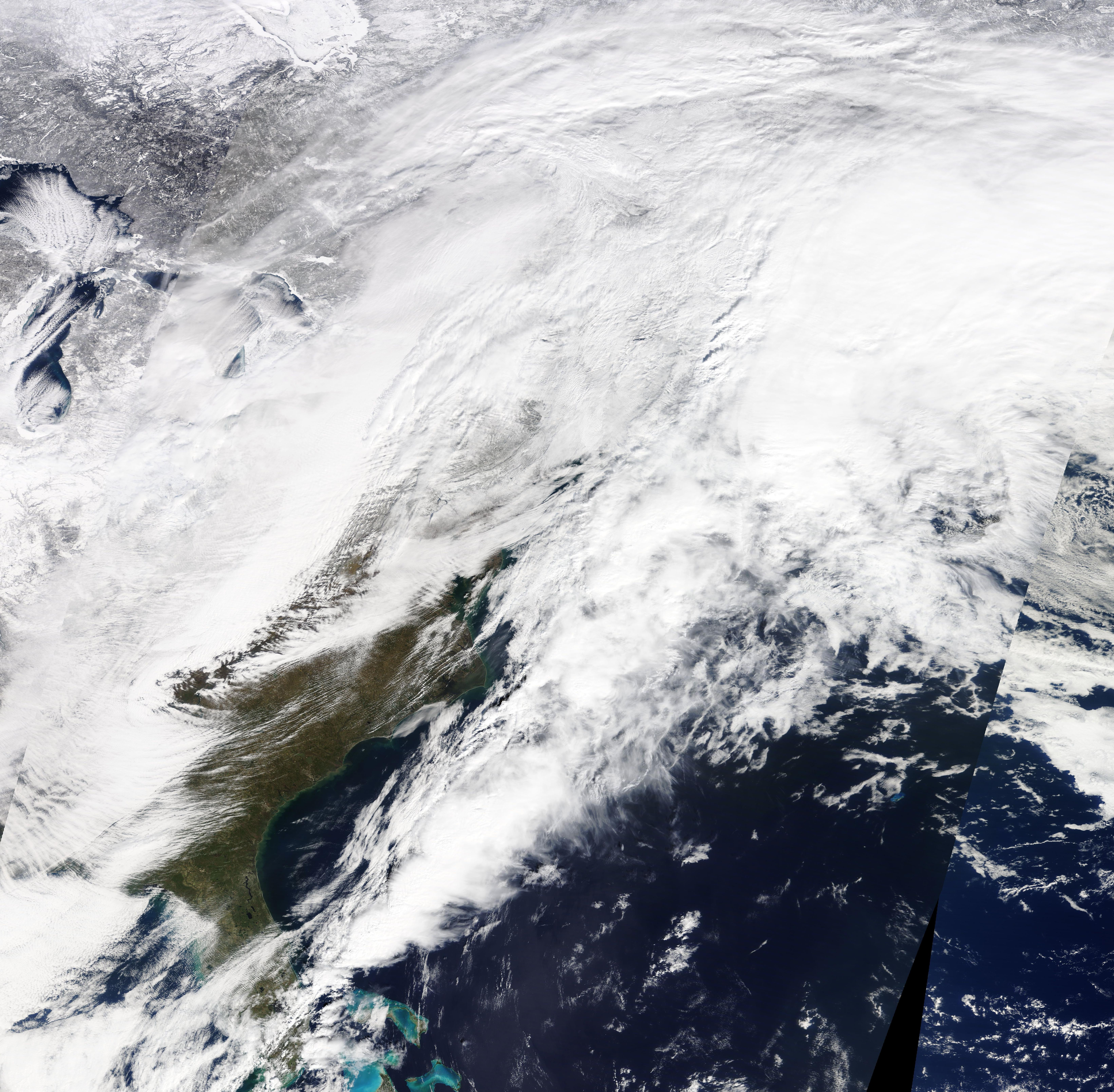
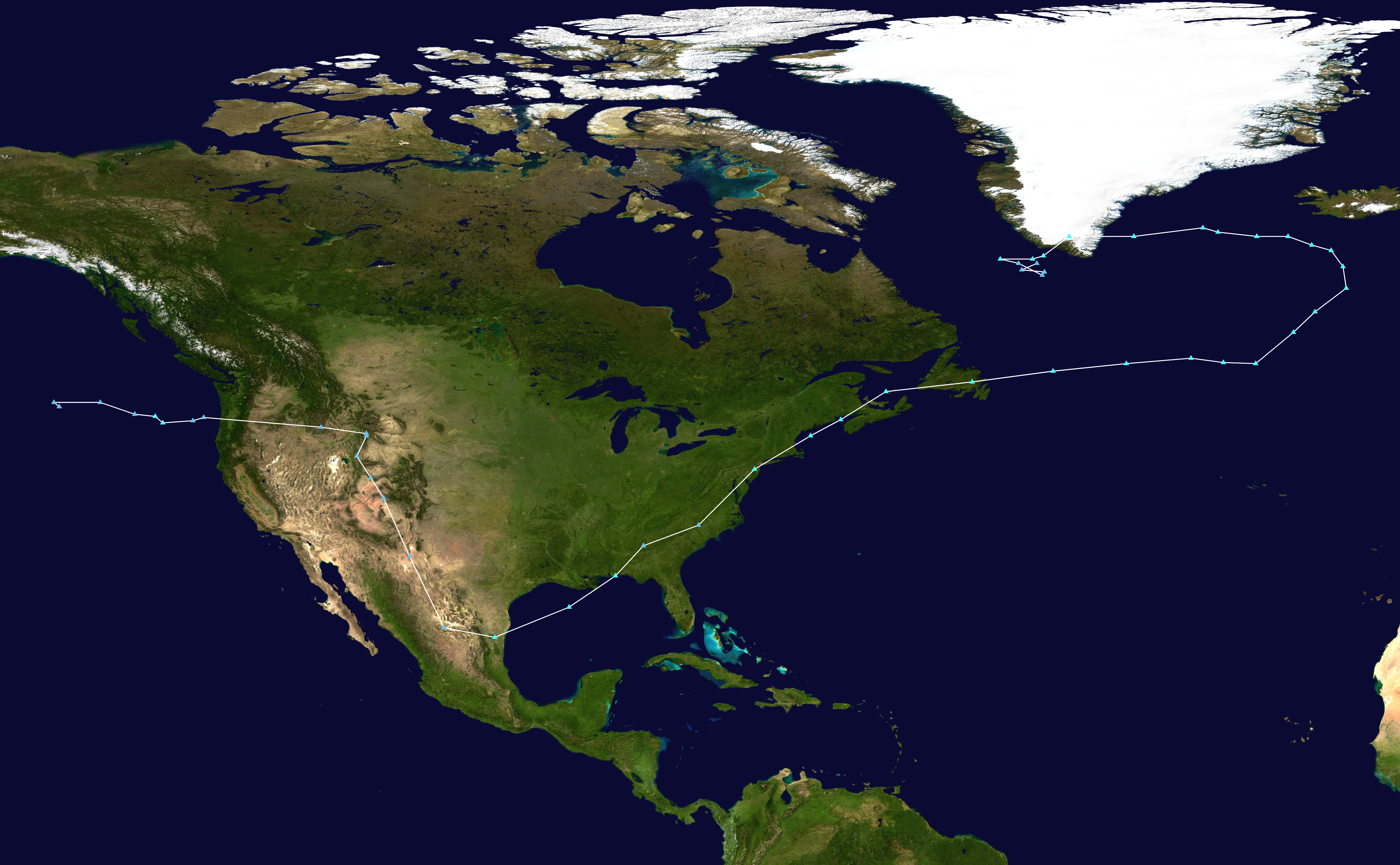
- Duration: February 13 – February 17, 2021
- Lowest pressure: 960 mb (28.35 inHg)
- Maximum snow: 26 in (66 cm)
- Fatalities: 290 fatalities
- Damage: ≥ $25.5 billion (2021 USD)

A third, unusually significant winter storm impacted the Pacific Northwest from February 12 to 13; Seattle received 11.1 inches (28 cm) of snow. Texas Governor Greg Abbott announced a federal emergency declaration after a significant snow event in Texas accompanied by extreme cold.

The storm caused blackouts for nearly 10 million customers in the United States and in northern Mexico, triggering a severe power crisis in Texas in the process. The storm killed at least 237 people, including 223 in the United States and 14 in Mexico. This storm is estimated to have caused over $25.5 billion (2021 USD) in damages, including at least $24 billion in the United States and over $1.5 billion in Mexico, making it the costliest winter storm recorded in U.S. history and worldwide.

==== February 15–20 winter storm ====
- Category 3 "Major" (RSI/NOAA: 7.497)
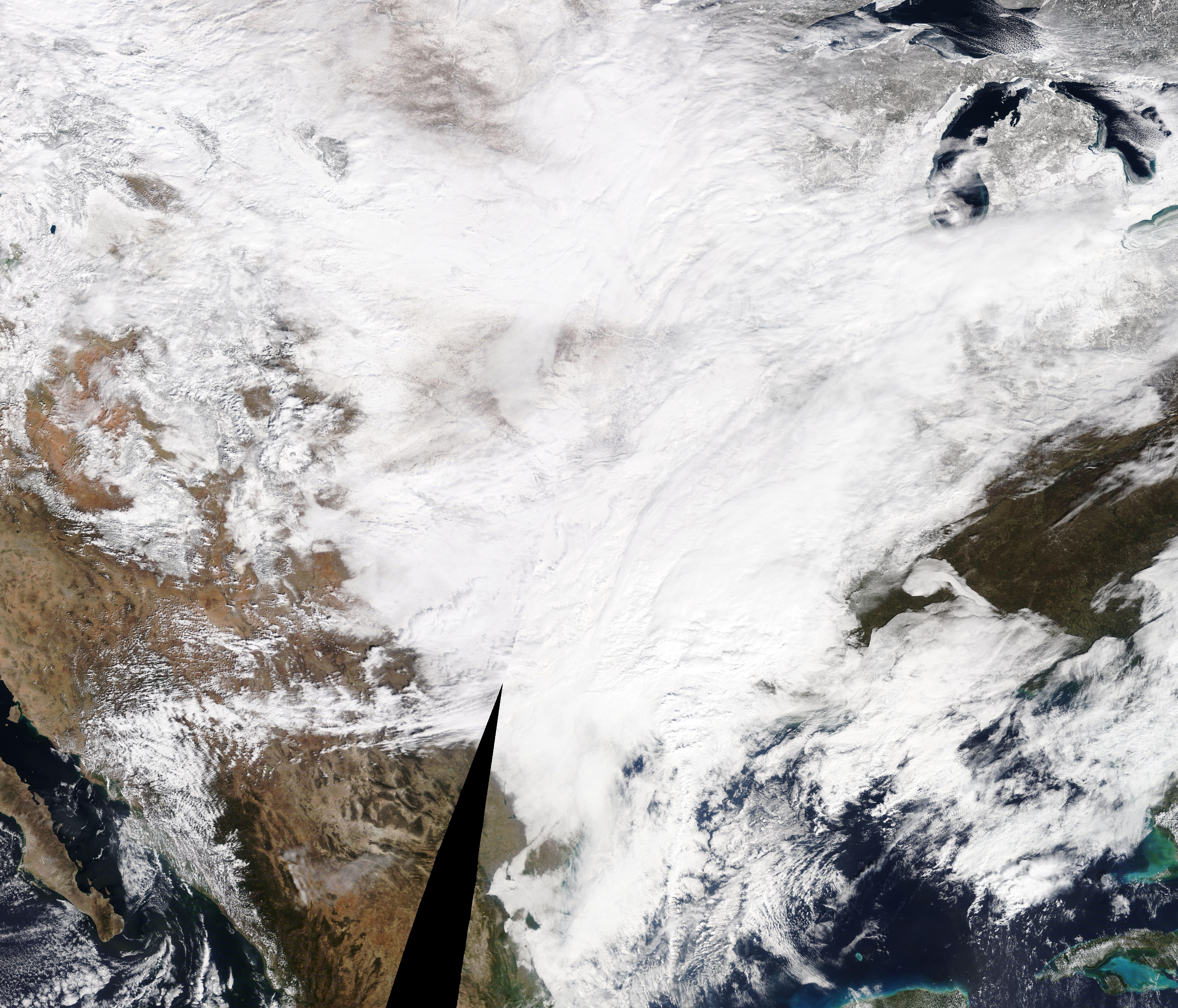
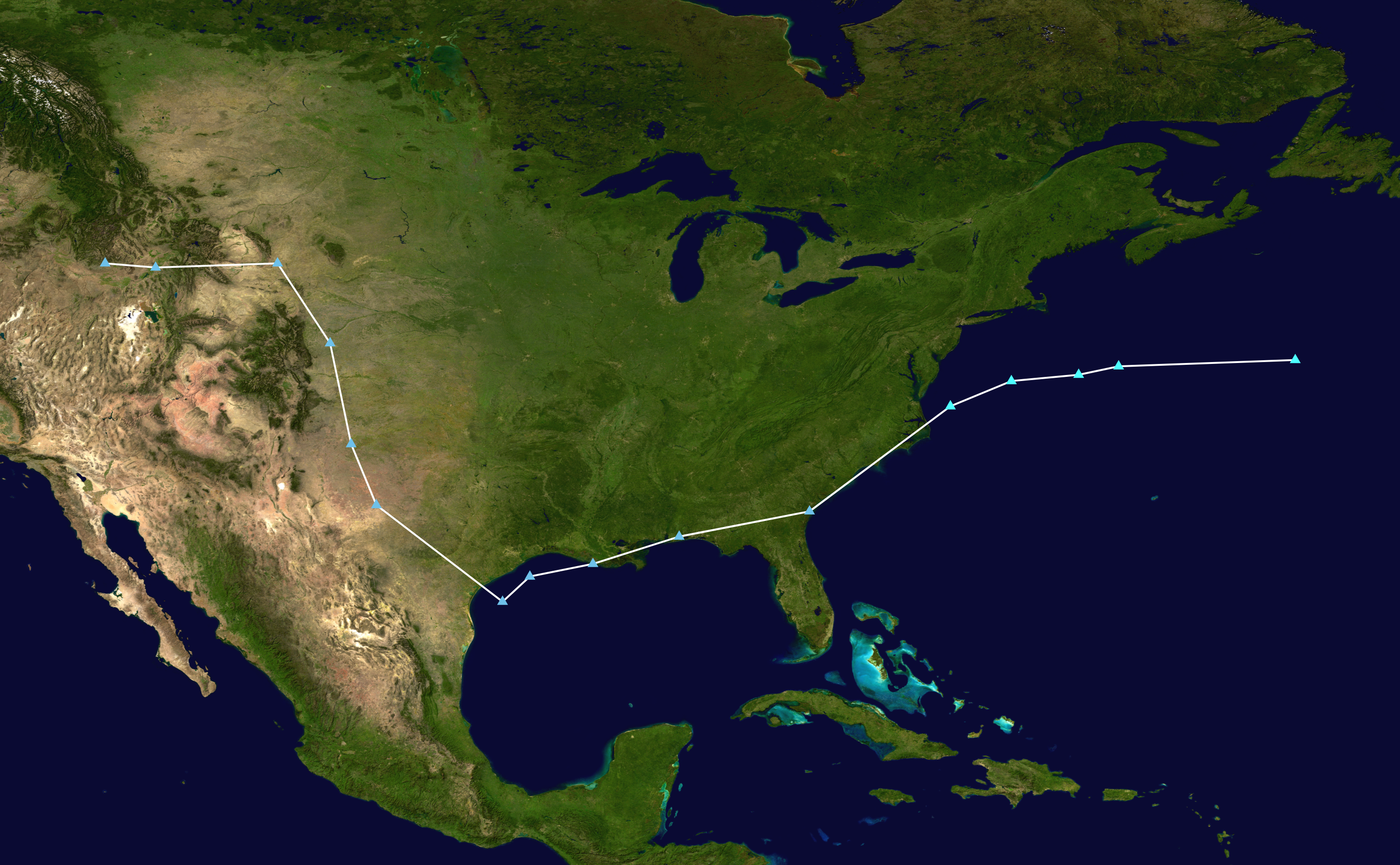
- Duration: February 15 – February 20, 2021
- Lowest pressure: 948 mb (27.99 inHg)
- Maximum snow: 24 in (61 cm)
- Fatalities: 29 fatalities
- Damage: > $2 billion (2021 USD)

A fourth storm brought a record-breaking 9 inches (23 cm) of snow to Del Rio, Texas and threatened Little Rock, Arkansas's snowfall record with 11.8 inches (30 cm) falling there. It brought Little Rock's snow cover up to 15 inches (38 cm), breaking the all-time record there. Up to 14 inches (36 cm) fell to the south of the city. Elsewhere in the region, 0.1 inches (2.5 mm) to 0.25 inches (6.4 mm) of ice accretion impacted Houston, 4 inches (10 cm) of snow fell in Oklahoma City and 7.2 inches (18 cm) in Memphis, Tennessee.

Impacts from the storm stretched all the way into Massachusetts. 100 cars became stranded on roadways near Florence, Alabama due to the wintry weather. Up to 0.5 inches (13 mm) of ice accretion was reported in parts of Virginia, West Virginia and North Carolina. 10.2 inches (26 cm) of snow fell in Norristown, Pennsylvania. The storm brought Philadelphia's total seasonal snowfall total to 22.5 inches (57 cm), which is exactly average. The system killed at least 29 people, and it is estimated to have caused at least $2 billion (2021 USD) in damages.

=== Early March New England cold wave ===
On February 28, an Arctic airmass began working its way south into southern Canada, behind a low pressure system in a trough in the jet stream. The next day, the powerful low pressure swung northeastward into the Canadian Maritimes, as two cold fronts behind the system ushered in an Arctic airmass into the Northeast and New England. A strong pressure gradient set up later in the day behind the now stationary low pressure, unleashing powerful winds. Overnight, wind chills dropped to as low as −40 °F (−40 °C), prompting wind chill advisories in much of New England, as well as wind chill warnings in portions of far northern New England. Very cold temperatures and strong winds continued into March 2, with wind chill high temperatures barely reaching 5 °F (−15 °C) in many areas. Mount Washington, New Hampshire reported sustained winds of 114 mph (183 km/h), and combined with air temperatures of −27 °F (−33 °C), led to a wind chill temperature of −80 °F (−62 °C) on the morning of March 2. The strong winds and cold temperatures caused over 165,000 power outages in New England during the event from March 1–2. Parts of US 1 closed due to the blowing snow.

=== Mid-March blizzards ===
==== March 11–14 blizzard ====
- Category 3 "Major" (RSI/NOAA: 7.844)
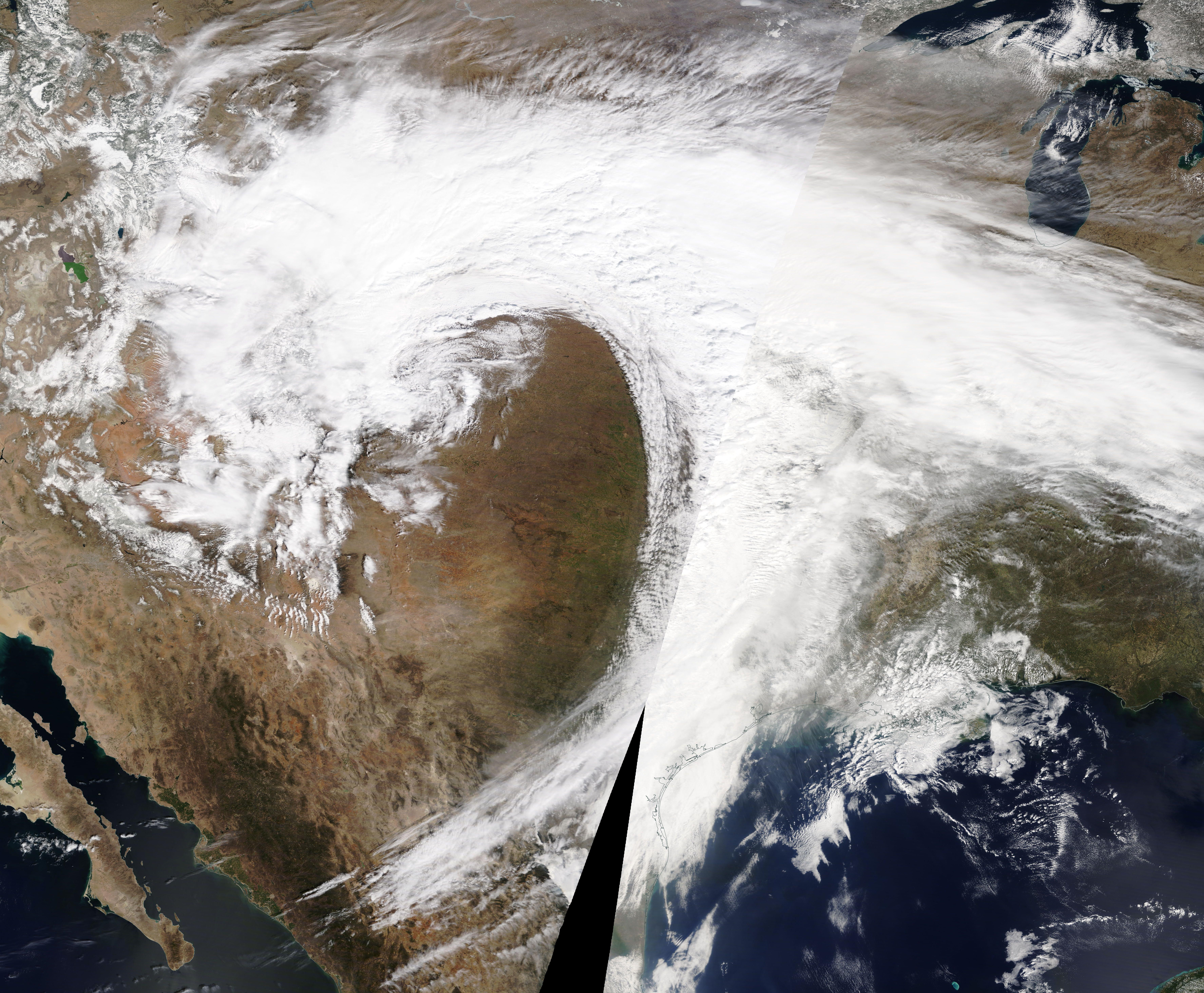
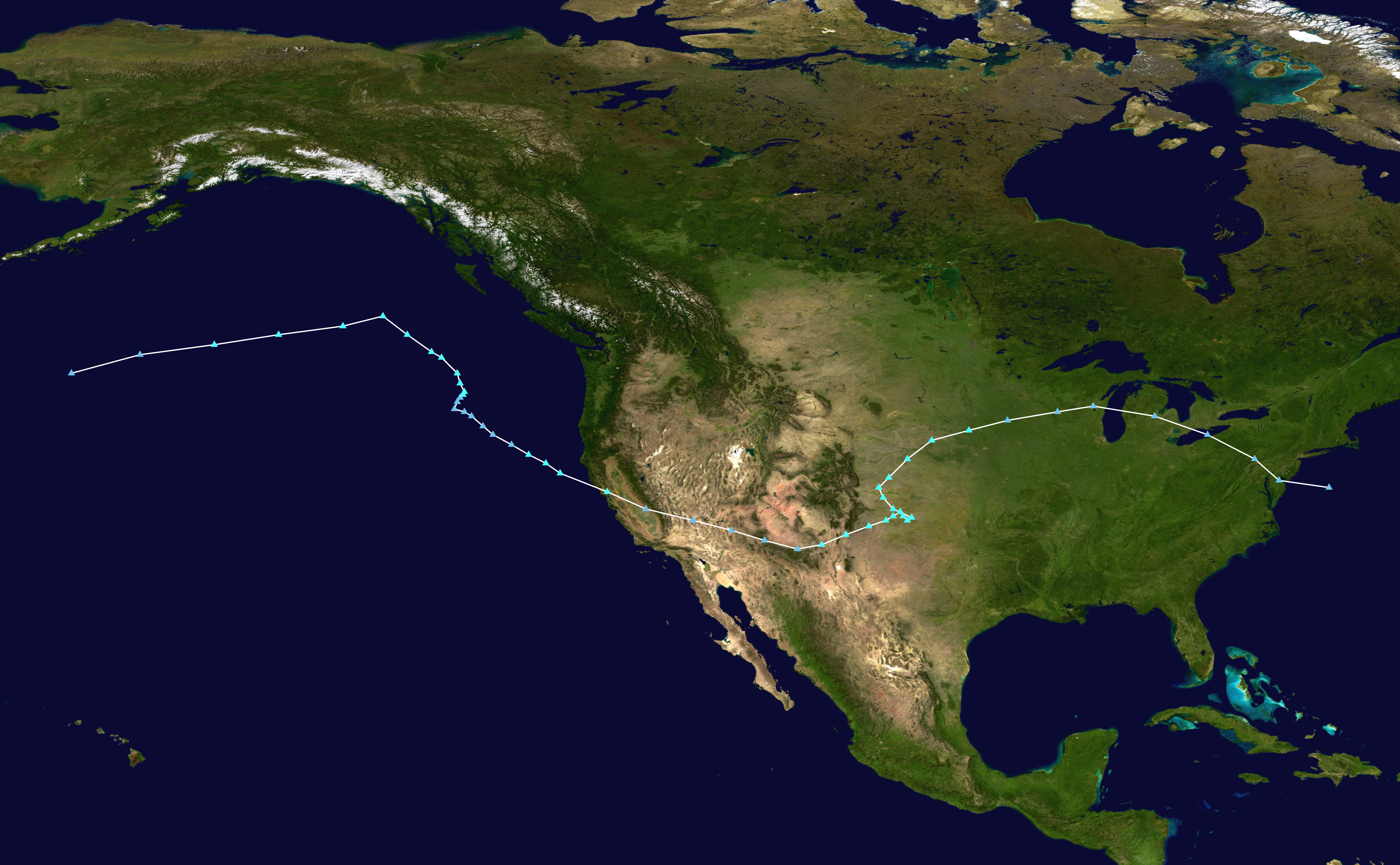
- Duration: March 10 – March 16, 2021
- Lowest pressure: 980 mb (28.94 inHg)
- Maximum snow: 52.5 in (133 cm)
- Damage: ≥ $75 million (2021 USD)

A significant blizzard brought Cheyenne their largest two-day snowfall on record with 30.8 inches falling from March 13–14. The storm closed schools and colleges and city and state government buildings. Schools and government offices also shut down in Casper. Denver received their second-largest March snowfall on record with 27.1 inches falling at the airport. The storm was also Denver's fourth-largest snowstorm on record. The storm shut down major highways, caused more than 2,000 flights to be canceled and left over 50,000 customers without power. The system caused at least $75 million in damages. The storm was unofficially named Xylia by The Weather Channel.

==== March 16–17 blizzard ====
Late on March 16, Blizzard Warnings were issued for the Texas and Oklahoma panhandles and surrounding areas. On the following day, near-zero visibility was reported in the area for hours in a row, causing numerous crashes and bringing parts of Highway 70 to a standstill. Crashes as well as extremely poor road conditions resulted in closures on several major highways, including I-40 and US-287. Amarillo, Texas saw 5.7 inches (14 cm) of snow and areas to the northeast saw in excess of 6 inches (15 cm). The blizzard was also followed by a flash freeze overnight on March 17, resulting in a freeze-up of snow-covered roadways and more crashes overnight.

=== Mid-April nor'easter ===
- Category 0 "Nuisance" (RSI/NOAA: N/A)
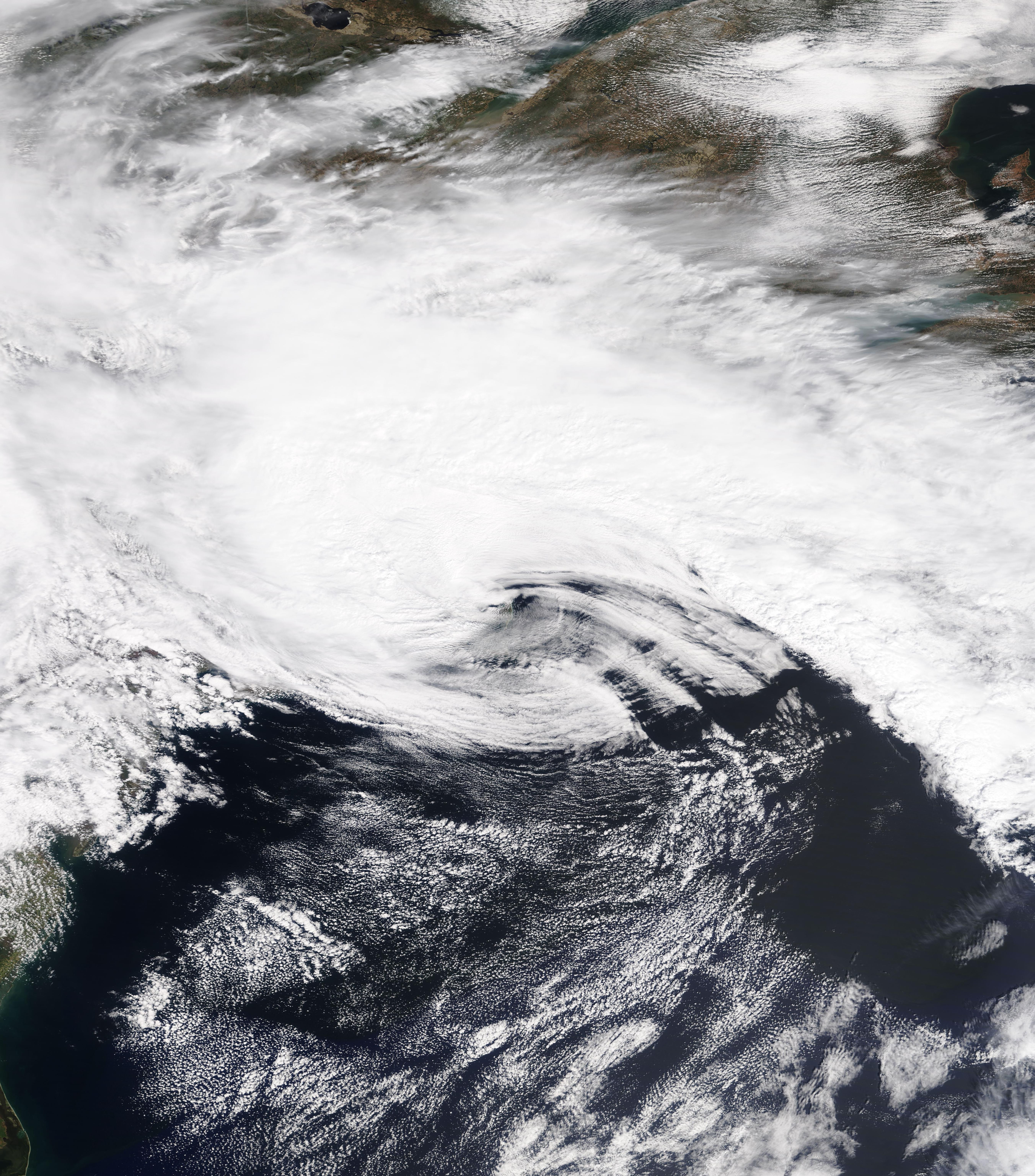
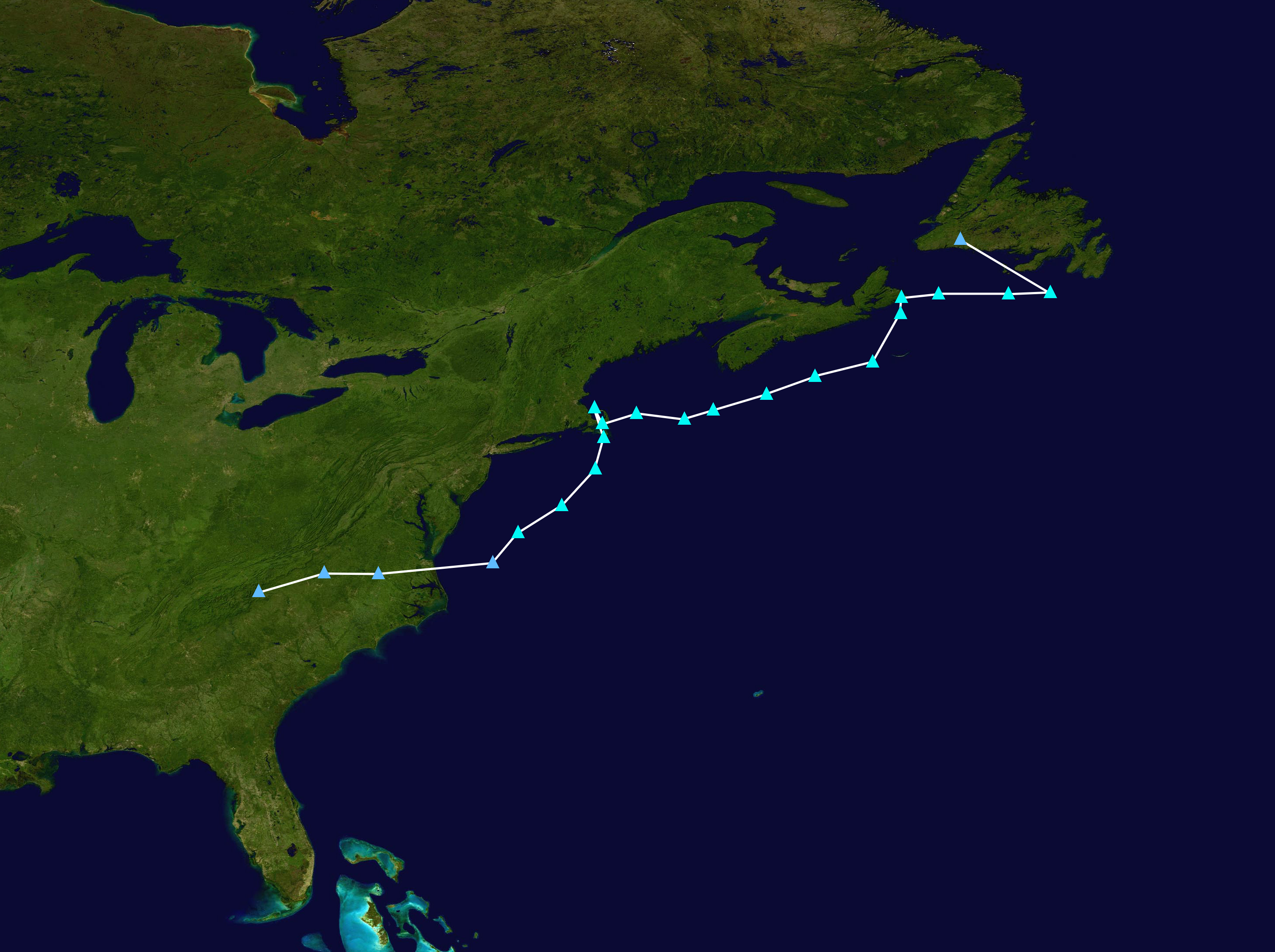
- Duration: April 15 – April 17, 2021
- Lowest pressure: 988 mb (29.18 inHg)
- Maximum snow: 13 in (33 cm)

On April 14, Winter Storm Watches were issued in much of interior New England, and the next day, watches were expanded and Winter Storm Warnings were also issued. Much of interior New England was expected to see over 10 inches (25 cm) of snow. Precipitation initially started as rain on April 15, but slowly changed over to snow in the mountains overnight. By the next morning, the rain-snow line had pushed as far east as the eastern Massachusetts coast. Heavy snowfall fell throughout the day on April 16, with snowfall rates of 1.5 in (3.8 cm) and higher being reported. The higher elevations saw a widespread 6+ inches (15+ cm) of snow, and Spofford, New Hampshire saw the highest total during the storm of 13 inches (33 cm).

== Records ==
=== United States ===
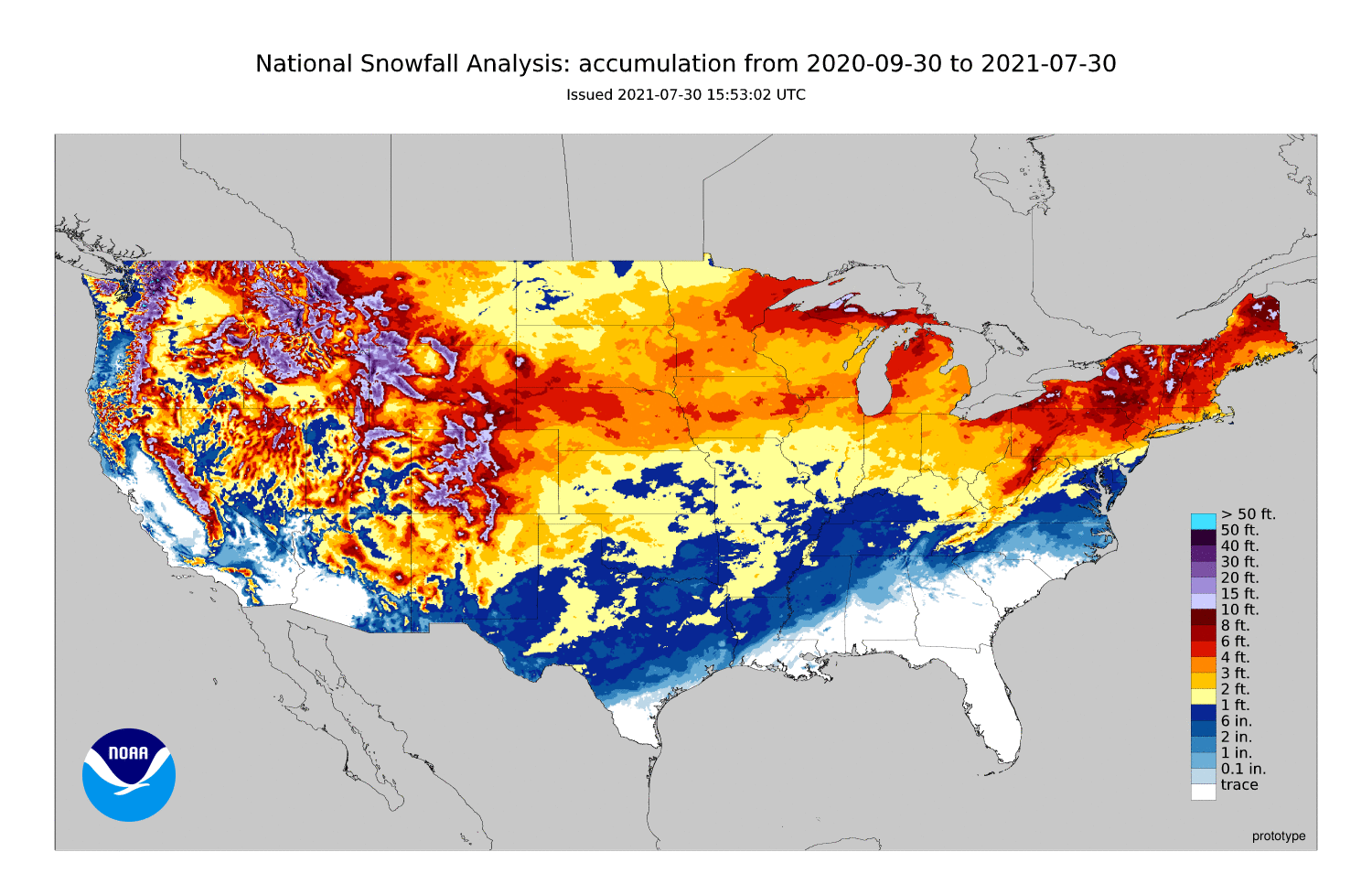
Seasonal snowfall in the United States until July 30, 2021. Note the record extent of snowfall in the South.

The cities of Billings, Montana and Fargo, North Dakota experienced their longest streak of sub-zero (0 °F [−18 °C]) temperatures since at least 1983 and 1996, respectively. Des Moines, Iowa experienced its sixth-coldest February on record with an average temperature of 15.2 °F [−9.3 °C]. The city recorded its coldest temperature of the month on the morning of February 16, with a low temperature of −17 °F [−27 °C]. Two days prior, a record-low high of −4 °F [−20 °C] was recorded. On February 16, Little Rock experienced a temperature of −1 °F [−18 °C], which was the coldest since 1989, with all-time low temperatures being set in Fayetteville, Arkansas (−20 °F [−29 °C]) and Hastings, Nebraska (−30 °F [−34 °C]).

Del Rio, Texas picked up 9.7 inches (25 cm) of snow from February 17–18, breaking the all-time one-day and 24-hour snowfall records, both of which had previously been set in January 1985. Little Rock, Arkansas saw 11.8 inches (30 cm) of snow from the same storm, making it the city's second-largest snowstorm in history, as well as pushing the city to tie its record snow depth of 15 inches (38 cm). Austin realized their snowiest February on record.

October 2020 was the snowiest October on record in Spokane, Washington, with a record 7.5 inches (19 cm) falling there. Great Falls, Montana also saw their snowiest October on record, as did Boston. In Mankato, Minnesota a high temperature of 28 °F (−2 °C) made it the coldest October high temperature in the town.

The Blue Hill Observatory in Milton, Massachusetts saw 3.6 inches (9.1 cm) of snow from a nor'easter on April 16, making it their sixth-largest April snowstorm on record. Paducah, Kentucky and Evansville, Indiana saw their latest ever snowflakes on April 21. May 2021 became the 9th snowiest May in Binghamton, New York. On the opposite end, several cities in Wyoming saw their earliest snow on record on September 8, while Goodland, Kansas saw their earliest measurable snow on September 9.

In New York City, the 8th snowiest February, occurred, as snow was over 26 inches (66 cm). This became the snowiest February across portions of Northern New Jersey as well. Parts of northeastern Pennsylvania also recorded their second snowiest February. The second snowiest February on record also occurred in Cincinnati, which logged 21.9 inches (56 cm) of snow during the month.

Glasgow, Montana and Bismarck, North Dakota saw their warmest first half of winter on record, which was tied in Sioux Falls, South Dakota. International Falls, Minnesota and Fargo, North Dakota ranked second.

=== Northern Mexico ===
In the city of Saltillo, temperatures reached as low as −4.5 °C (23.9 °F) early on February 16 as bitterly cold air continental polar surged south from Canada and the United States into Mexico. They were the coldest temperatures reported within the city since the Early 2014 North American cold wave.

== Season effects ==
This is a table of all of the events that have occurred in the 2020–21 North American winter. It includes their duration, damage, impacted locations, and death totals. Deaths in parentheses are additional and indirect (an example of an indirect death would be a traffic accident), but were still related to that storm. All of the damage figures are in 2021 USD.

Regional snowfall index scale
| C0 | C1 | C2 | C3 | C4 | C5 |

2020–21 North American winter season statistics
| Event name | Dates active | RSI category | RSI value | Highest gust mph (km/h) | Minimum pressure (mbar) | Maximum snow in (cm) | Maximum ice in (mm) | Areas affected | Damage (2021 USD) | Deaths |
|---|---|---|---|---|---|---|---|---|---|---|
| Late October ice storm | October 26 – 28 | N/A | Nl/A | 31 (50) | 1000 | 18 | 2 (51) | Southern Plains | $125 million | None |
| Ex-Zeta | October 29 – 30 | N/A | N/A | N/A | 970 | 6.5 (17) | N/A | Upstate New York, New England | Unknown | None |
| Late November storm complex | November 29 – December 2 | N/A | N/A | 70 (115) | 993 | 24 (61) | N/A | Ohio Valley, Appalachian Mountains, Eastern Canada | $100 million | None |
| Early December nor'easter | December 4 – 6 | N/A | N/A | 105 (169) | 976 | 18 (46) | N/A | Northeastern United States, New England, Atlantic Canada | $25 million | None |
| Mid-December nor'easter | December 14 – 18 | Category 2 | 5.58 | 63 (101) | 995 | 44 (110) | 0.6 (15) | Southern Plains, Upland South, Northeastern United States, Atlantic Canada | $125 million | 7 |
| Christmas Week blizzard | December 23 – 25 | N/A | N/A | 68 (109) | 985 | 13 (33) | N/A | Northern Plains, Upper Midwest, Ohio Valley, Northern Appalachians, Eastern Canada | $340 million | None |
| New Year's winter storm | December 30 – January 2 | Category 1 | 1.788 | N/A | 1001 | 24 (61) | 0.66 (17) | High Plains, Central United States, Northeastern United States, Atlantic Canada, Nova Scotia | $35 million | 3 |
| Mid-January blizzard | January 12 – 17 | N/A | N/A | 125 (201) | 991 | 8 (20) | N/A | Pacific Northwest, Northern Plains, Midwestern United States, Northeastern United States, Southern Canada | $525 million | 2 |
| Late January winter storm | January 24 – 27 | N/A | N/A | N/A | 998 | 14.5 (37) | N/A | Northern Plains, Upper Midwest, Ohio Valley, New England | $120 million | None |
| Groundhog Day nor'easter | January 25 – February 4 | Category 3 | 6.188 | 125 (201) | 984 | 107 (270) | 0.33 (8) | Western United States, Central United States, Ohio Valley, Mid-Atlantic states, Northeastern United States, Southeastern United States, Eastern Canada | $1.85 billion | 7 |
| Super Bowl Sunday nor'easter | February 6 – 8 | N/A | N/A | N/A | 960 | 20 (50) | N/A | Mid-Atlantic states, Northeastern United States, Atlantic Canada, Southern Greenland, Iceland | Unknown | 1 |
| February 10–12 ice storm | February 10 – 12 | N/A | N/A | N/A | 1014 | 5.1 (13) | 0.5 (13) | Southern United States, Upland South, Central United States, Mid-Atlantic states | > $75 million | 12 |
| February 11–14 ice storm | February 11 – 14 | N/A | N/A | N/A | 1010 | N/A | 1.5 (38) | Pacific Northwest, Central United States, Mid-Atlantic states, Northeastern United States | Unknown | None |
| February 13–17 winter storm | February 13 – 17 | Category 3 | 8.048 | N/A | 960 | 26 (66) | 0.85 (22) | Western United States, Southern United States, Eastern United States, Northern Mexico, Eastern Canada, British Isles, Iceland, Southern Greenland | ≥ $25.5 billion | 290 |
| February 15–20 winter storm | February 15 – 20 | Category 3 | 7.497 | N/A | 948 | 24 (61) | 0.7 (18) | Western United States, Southern Plains, Deep South, Northeastern United States, Atlantic Canada, British Isles, Iceland, Faroe Islands | ≥ $2 billion | 29 |
| March 11–14 blizzard | March 10 – 16 | Category 3 | 7.844 | N/A | 980 | 52.5 (133) | N/A | Western United States, Rocky Mountains, Midwestern United States, New England | $75 million | None |
| March 16–17 blizzard | March 16 – 17 | N/A | N/A | 64 (103) | 997 | 6.2 (16) | N/A | Southern Plains | Unknown | None |
| Mid-April nor'easter | April 15 – 17 | N/A | N/A | 67 (108) | 988 | 13 (33) | N/A | Northeastern United States, New England, Atlantic Canada | Unknown | None |
Season aggregates
| 6 RSI storms | October 26 – April 17 | | | | 948 | 107 (270) | 2 (51) | | ≥ $30.745 billion | 358 |

== See also ==
- North American winter
- Winter storm
- 2020–21 European windstorm season
- Weather of 2021

== Notes ==
| Preceded by 2019–20 | North American winters 2020–21 | Succeeded by 2021–22 |
