= Ash Lake, Minnesota =

Ash Lake
- Unincorporated community
- Location within Minnesota Location within the United States
- Coordinates: 48°13′08″N 92°54′58″W
- Country: United States
- State: Minnesota
- County: Saint Louis
- Unorganized territory: Northwest St. Louis
- Elevation: 1,335 ft (407 m)

Population
  - Total: 20
- Time zone: UTC-6 (Central (CST))
  - Summer (DST): UTC-5 (CDT)
- ZIP codes: 55771
- Area code: 218
- GNIS feature ID: 660687

Ash Lake is an unincorporated community in Saint Louis County, Minnesota, United States; located within the Kabetogama State Forest.

The community is 13 miles (21 km) north of Orr, and 30 miles (48 km) north of Cook. It lies along U.S. Highway 53 near UT Road 8146, Jacobs Road. The Ash River and Ash Lake are both in the vicinity.

Ash Lake is 40 miles (64 km) southeast of International Falls.
