= 2020–21 New Year's North American winter storm =

Category 1 winter storm on New Year's Eve and Day

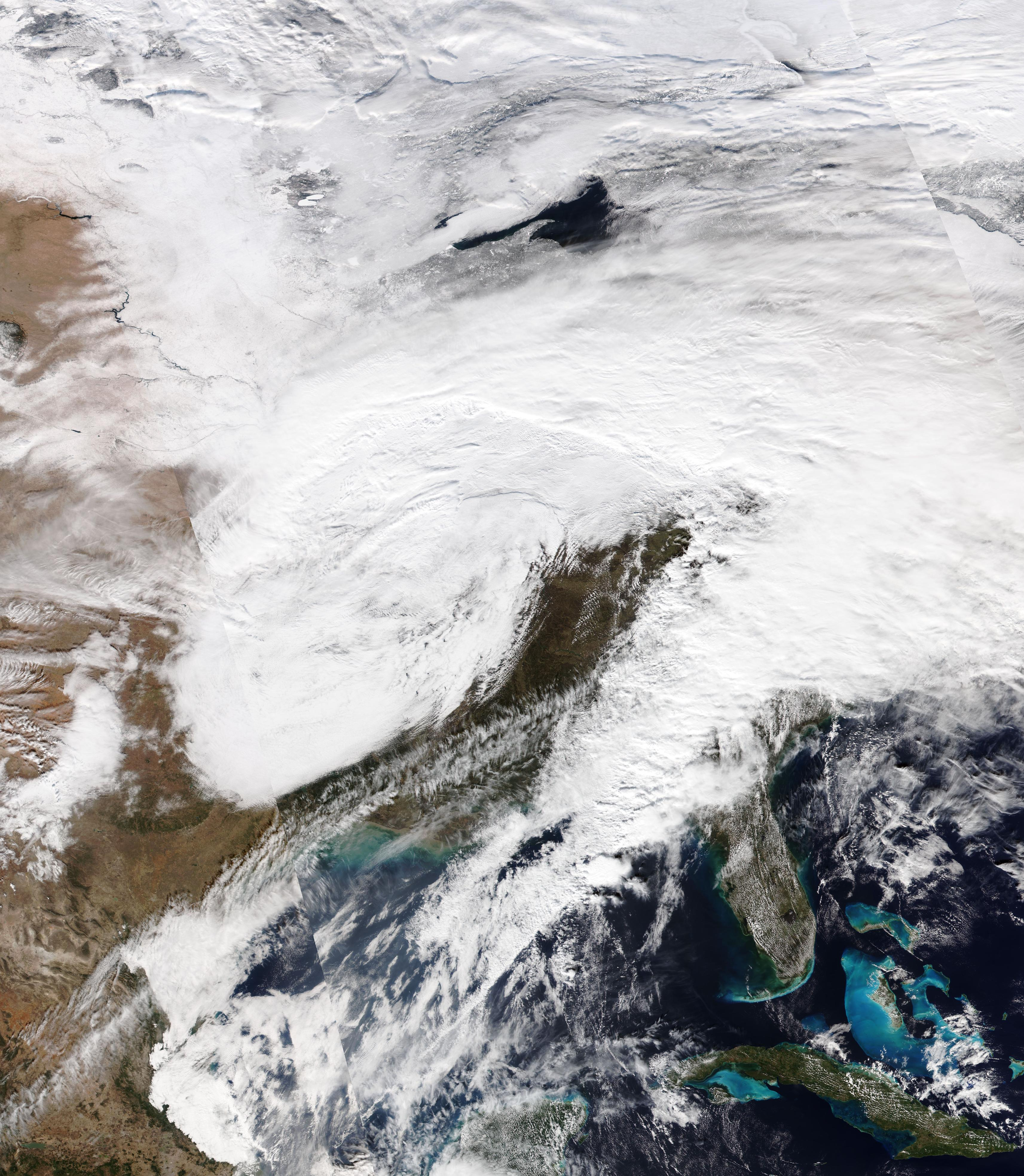
- The winter storm impacting the Central United States on January 1, 2021

Meteorological history
- Formed: December 30, 2020
- Dissipated: January 3, 2021

Category 1 "Notable" winter storm
- Regional snowfall index: 1.79 (NOAA)
- Lowest pressure: 1001 mbar (hPa); 29.56 inHg
- Max. snowfall: Snowfall – 24.0 inches (61 cm) in Big Bend National Park, Texas; Ice — 0.66 inches (1.7 cm) in Blue Knob Mountain, Pennsylvania

Tornado outbreak
- Tornadoes: 4 on January 1
- Max. rating: EF1 tornado

Overall effects
- Fatalities: 3 total
- Damage: > $35 million (2021 USD)
- Areas affected: High Plains, Central United States, Northeastern United States, Atlantic Canada, Nova Scotia
- Power outages: > 119,000
- Part of the 2020–21 North American winter

The 2020–21 New Year's North American winter storm was a major storm system that brought a wide swath of snow and ice to parts of the High Plains and Central and Northeastern United States during the New Years holiday from December 30–January 2. The system began developing early on December 30, and began spreading wintry precipitation to parts of Texas, coalescing into a low pressure system that formed near the western Gulf of Mexico. The winter storm tracked north and brought heavy snow, ice and strong winds to much of the center of the Midwest and interior parts of the Northeast and New England, causing widespread impacts and travel issues.

Prior to the storm, Oklahoma declared a state of emergency for several dozen counties due to expected icy conditions; the ice storm came only a few months after a crippling ice storm impacted the state in late October. In other states, wintry weather caused up to 100,000 power outages. One person was killed by the storm in Missouri, due to treacherous roads. The storm caused over $35 million (2021 USD) in damages. It was unofficially named Winter Storm John by The Weather Channel.

== Meteorological history ==
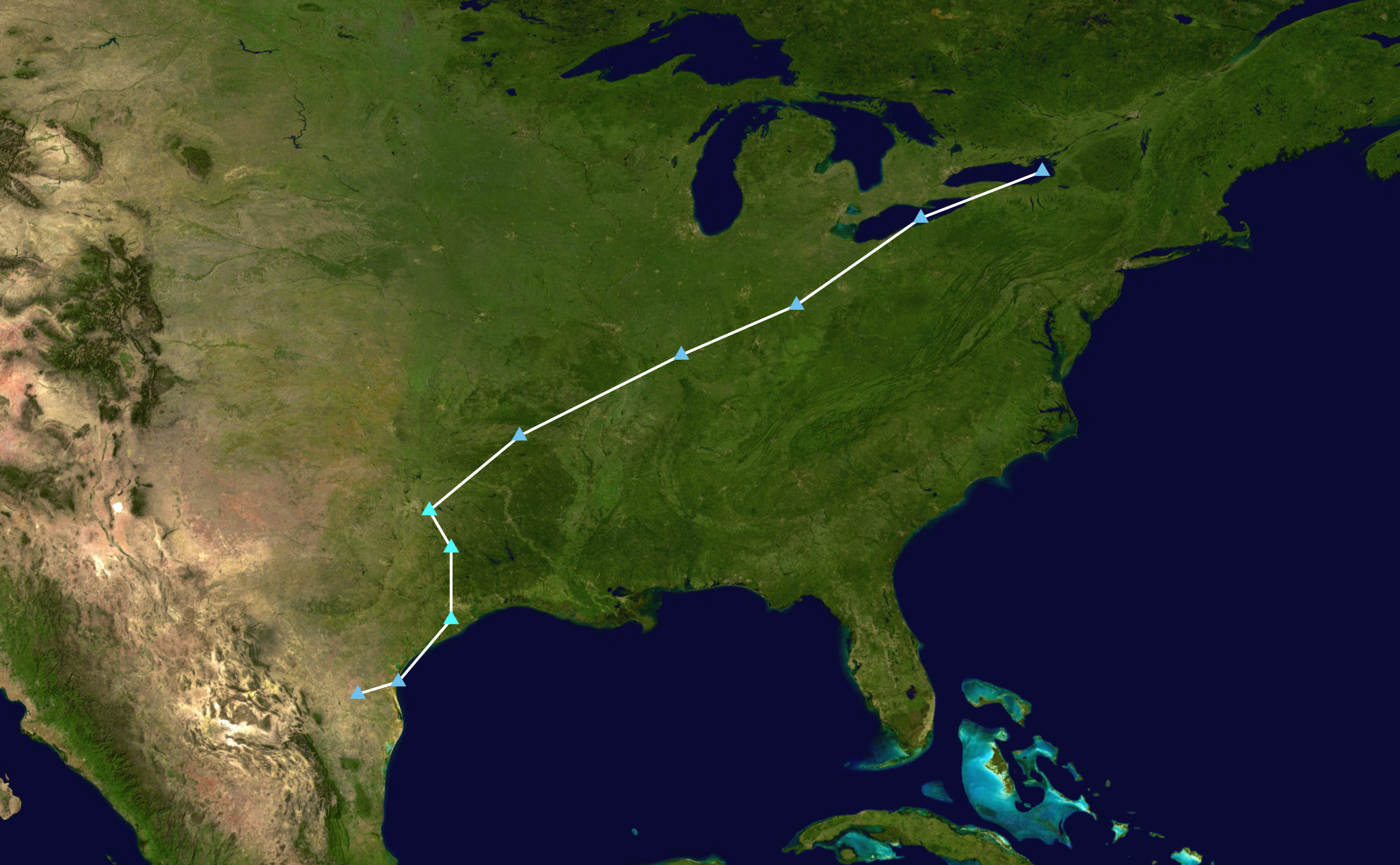
Map plotting the storm's track and intensity, according to the Saffir–Simpson scale Map key Saffir–Simpson scale Tropical depression (≤38 mph, ≤62 km/h) Tropical storm (39–73 mph, 63–118 km/h) Category 1 (74–95 mph, 119–153 km/h) Category 2 (96–110 mph, 154–177 km/h) Category 3 (111–129 mph, 178–208 km/h) Category 4 (130–156 mph, 209–251 km/h) Category 5 (≥157 mph, ≥252 km/h) Unknown Storm type Tropical cyclone Subtropical cyclone Extratropical cyclone, remnant low, tropical disturbance, or monsoon depression

On December 30, an extratropical low formed over the northern Gulf of Mexico, to the south of Texas. Later that day, the low made landfall in southeastern Texas. In Western Texas, snow, freezing rain and sleet began to fall, prompting Winter Storm Warnings across the region and extending into Oklahoma. In tandem with an upper-level low that was located over Mexico, during the next couple of days, the system moved northeastward, strengthening and later bringing more wintry weather to the Northeast. It did not strengthen appreciably, although a large plume of precipitation spread across the Midwest, Great Lakes and into Canada as well. The storm dissipated by January 3.

== Preparations and impact ==
Ahead of and during the storm, the National Weather Service issued Winter Storm Watches and Warnings across a large swath of the Central United States, ranging from Texas to as far as Maine as the system progressed. In addition, Ice Storm Warnings were issued in parts of Illinois, particularly due to expected widespread ice accumulations of at least 0.25 inches (6.4 mm).

=== Central United States ===
The unusual severity of the winter weather led to the closure of parts of Interstate 10 in Texas, which stranded dozens of travelers that had to seek shelter in two school gyms in Marfa. Interstate 20 also experienced 13 hour delays. The Big Bend National Park had to be closed, due to heavy snow of up to 2 feet (24 in; 61 cm) deep. Two migrants died after being caught in the storm in western Texas.

In Oklahoma, governor Kevin Stitt declared a state of emergency for 39 counties on December 31 due to the impending hazardous winter weather. The city of Oklahoma City recorded its highest daily snowfall record of about 4 inches (10 cm). In addition, ice accumulations caused major problems and thousands of power outages across the state, due to freezing rain accumulating on power lines and trees and weighing them down.

Kansas City in Missouri saw its greatest snowfall total in months, recording up to 3.5 inches (8.9 cm) across parts of the metro, which tied a record snowfall depth for the day of January 1, a record which was set in 1948 at the Kansas City International Airport. The Missouri Department of Transportation warned travelers to stay off the roadways due to the winter weather and ice. A jackknifed tractor-trailer resulted in the northbound lanes of Interstate 49 being closed early on January 1. A 38-year-old man was killed during the storm after being struck by another car when trying to warn residents about the icy roadways on January 1.

== See also ==
- December 2013 North American storm complex
- December 2015 North American storm complex
- Ice storm
- January 2017 North American ice storm
