= January 14–17, 2022 North American winter storm =

Category 2 snow and ice storm in North America

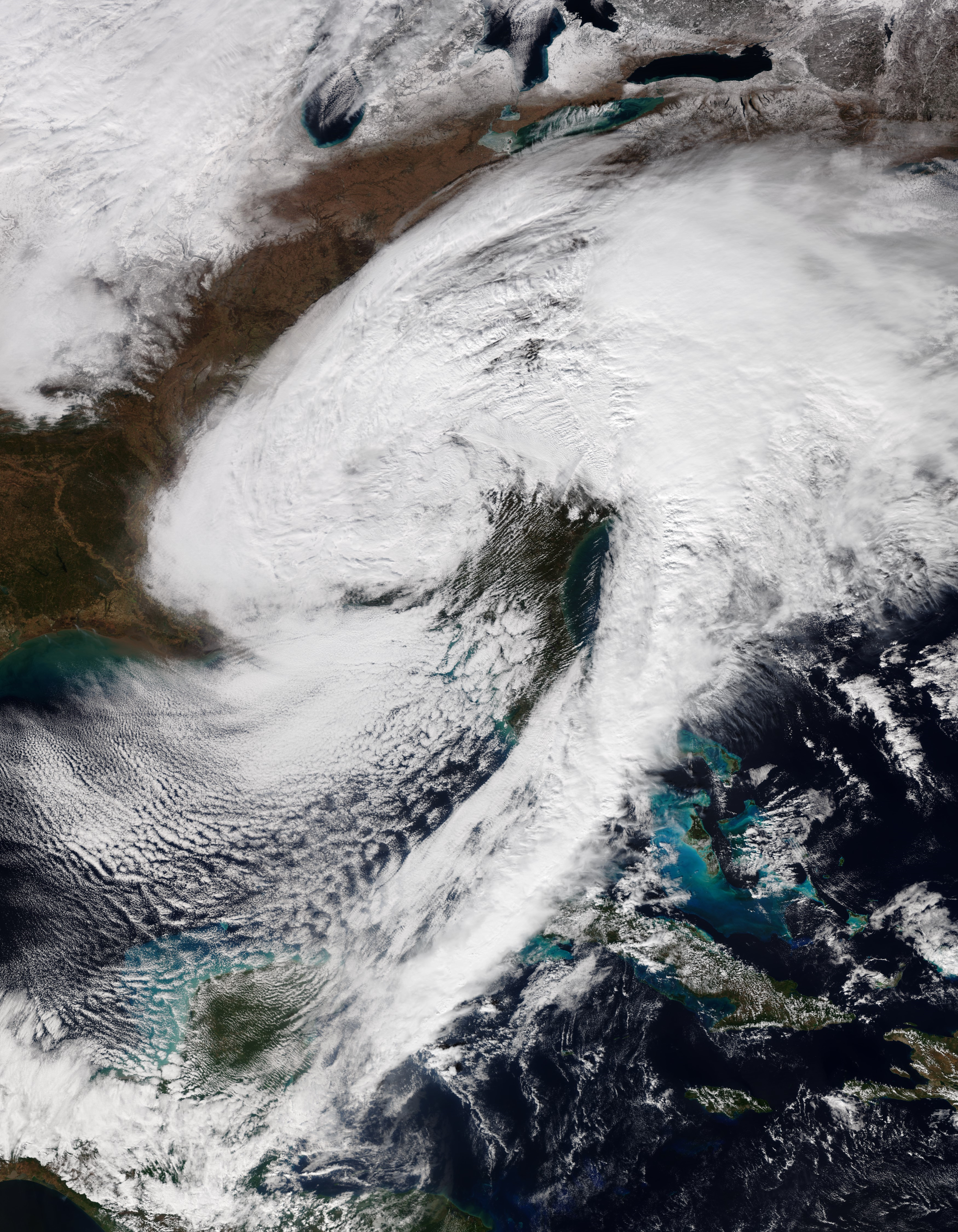
- The winter storm intensifying over the Southeastern United States late on January 16.

Meteorological history
- Formed: January 13, 2022
- Dissipated: January 19, 2022

Category 2 "Minor" winter storm
- Regional snowfall index: 3.41 (NOAA)
- Highest gusts: 91 mph (146 km/h) near Wellfleet, MA
- Lowest pressure: 981 mbar (hPa); 28.97 inHg
- Max. snowfall: Snow – 27.5 in (70 cm) near Ashtabula, Ohio; Ice – 0.50 in (13 mm) in Lancaster, South Carolina

Tornado outbreak
- Tornadoes: 7 on January 16
- Max. rating: EF2 tornado
- Duration: 9 hours, 39 minutes

Overall effects
- Fatalities: 4 total
- Injuries: 17
- Damage: $600 million (2022 USD)
- Areas affected: Central Canada, Northwestern, Central, Southeastern, and Northeastern United States
- Power outages: >375,000
- Part of the 2021–22 North American winter and Tornadoes of 2022

In mid-January 2022, a significant winter storm, unofficially referred to as Winter Storm Izzy by The Weather Channel and described as a "Saskatchewan Screamer", brought widespread impacts and wintry precipitation across large sections of eastern North America and parts of Canada. Forming out of a shortwave trough on January 13, it first produced a swath of snowfall extending from the High Plains to the Midwestern United States. The storm eventually pivoted east and impacted much of the Southern United States from January 15–16 before shifting north into Central Canada, the Mid-Atlantic states, and the Northeastern United States.

Several states in the Southeast declared states of emergencies ahead of the storm, including as North Carolina, South Carolina, Georgia, and Virginia. Snowfall totals of up to one foot (0.30 m) were observed across much of the affected areas in the High Plains and Central United States, with the storm bringing gusty winds and numerous power outages in its wake. The system also spawned seven tornadoes in Florida, one of which was an EF2 that resulted in three injuries. Ice storm conditions were observed in the Southeastern states, while snowfall amounts in excess of two feet (0.61 m) were reported across Northeast Ohio. Large areas of Southern Ontario received 33–55 centimetres (13–22 in) of snow, in some places at rates of over 10 centimetres (3.9 in) per hour, resulting in the closure of some highways, and impacting transit services in some areas.

== Meteorological history ==
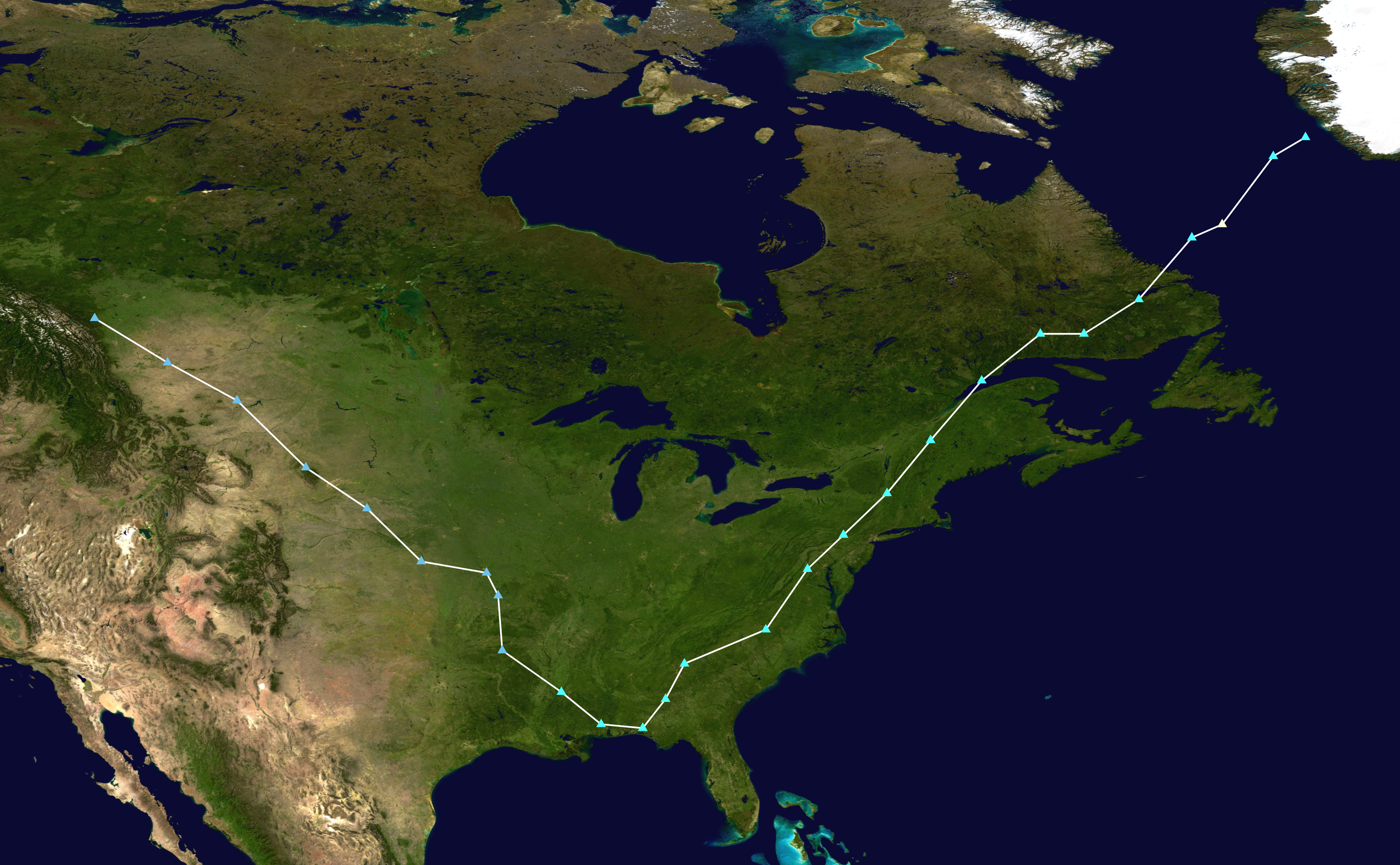
Map plotting the storm's track and intensity, according to the Saffir–Simpson scale Map key Saffir–Simpson scale Tropical depression (≤38 mph, ≤62 km/h) Tropical storm (39–73 mph, 63–118 km/h) Category 1 (74–95 mph, 119–153 km/h) Category 2 (96–110 mph, 154–177 km/h) Category 3 (111–129 mph, 178–208 km/h) Category 4 (130–156 mph, 209–251 km/h) Category 5 (≥157 mph, ≥252 km/h) Unknown Storm type Tropical cyclone Subtropical cyclone Extratropical cyclone, remnant low, tropical disturbance, or monsoon depression

A weak area of low pressure developed on January 13 in southwestern Canada along a stationary front from a weakening extratropical cyclone that was impacting the West Coast of the United States. From there, the system drifted southeastwards into the High Plains while delivering heavy snowfall and began moving more southwards through the states of Nebraska, Kansas and Missouri into the early morning hours of January 14. Later that day, at 21:00 UTC the Weather Prediction Center (WPC) began issuing periodic storm summary bulletins on the developing system, albeit with competing areas of low pressure. A stronger low began forming over southern Missouri on January 15, moving into Arkansas and began strengthening due to a strong upper-level low located nearby. Associated cold air in place over the aforementioned areas allowed snow to break out in areas further south, as the system began occluding – with a new low forming just offshore in the northern Gulf of Mexico before moving onshore – later that night as snowfall, ice and mixed precipitation spread eastward towards the Southeastern United States into the early morning hours of January 16. The winter storm began turning more northward later that day into the southern Appalachian Mountains as the two centers began merging.

== Preparations ==
=== Canada ===
Prior to snowfall, totals were forecasted between 20–40 centimetres (7.9–15.7 in) across Southern Ontario. In response to that, winter storm watches and warnings were issued across a large swath of southern Ontario and southwestern Quebec. As the storm progressed, a rare blizzard warning was issued for much of the Greater Toronto Area and National Capital Region, now forecasting up to 60 centimetres (24 in) of snow. This was the first blizzard warning for Toronto since 1993. Winter storm and snowfall warnings were expanded in to parts of central and southwestern Ontario. Ahead of the storm, many school districts cancelled in-person classes for January 17 and 18.

=== United States ===
Winter storm watches and warnings were issued across a large swath of the Central and Eastern United States, along with ice storm warnings for several areas in North Carolina and South Carolina due to the potential for ice accumulations. However, in New York City, it was expected to bring rain and strong winds. Amtrak cancelled several trains in advance of the storm.

==== Southeast ====
Georgia, Virginia, North Carolina and South Carolina all declared a state of emergency in preparation for the winter storm.

== Impacts ==
=== Canada ===
==== Ontario ====
The storm brought heavy snow across much of southern Ontario, with snow accumulations of up to 50 centimetres (20 in) in St. Catharines, 48 centimetres (19 in) in Ottawa (second largest snowstorm on record), 55 centimetres (22 in) of snow in Toronto (the third largest snowfall since 1937), (Note: Environment Canada official records measured 34 cm at Pearson International Airport and 36 cm in downtown Toronto while other observations mentioned 45 cm in Downsview; later the media and the City of Toronto began referring to as much as 55 cm.) 41 centimetres (16 in) in Hamilton, and 32 centimetres (13 in) in Kitchener-Waterloo. In hard hit areas, snow fell at a rate of over 10 centimetres (3.9 in) per hour during the morning of January 17, which along with winds created blizzard conditions.

In Toronto, the storm prompted the closure of Gardiner Expressway and the Don Valley Parkway for several hours in the early afternoon to remove stranded automobiles and to facilitate plowing, while sections of Highway 401 were blocked by stranded vehicles for up to 12 hours with one section blocked until the late morning of the next day. Near Ottawa, a stretch of Highway 7 was closed to due blizzard conditions and a section of Highway 417 was closed for eight hours due to a fatal accident that killed two people. Some cities' transit systems had difficulties providing service, such as 504 of the Toronto Transit Commission's 1,300 bus fleet and 150 OC Transpo buses being trapped in snow. (Note: Above-ground sections of three lines of the Toronto subway were unable to operate until the next day, although the Ottawa LRT was unaffected by the storm. Only transit service in the Niagara Region was actually suspended for the day.) School boards throughout the Golden Horseshoe closed their schools for both January 17 and 18 while some other school boards closed schools for January 17. The storm temporarily shut down Toronto Pearson International Airport, and forced the cancelation of all flights at Ottawa International Airport.

=== United States ===
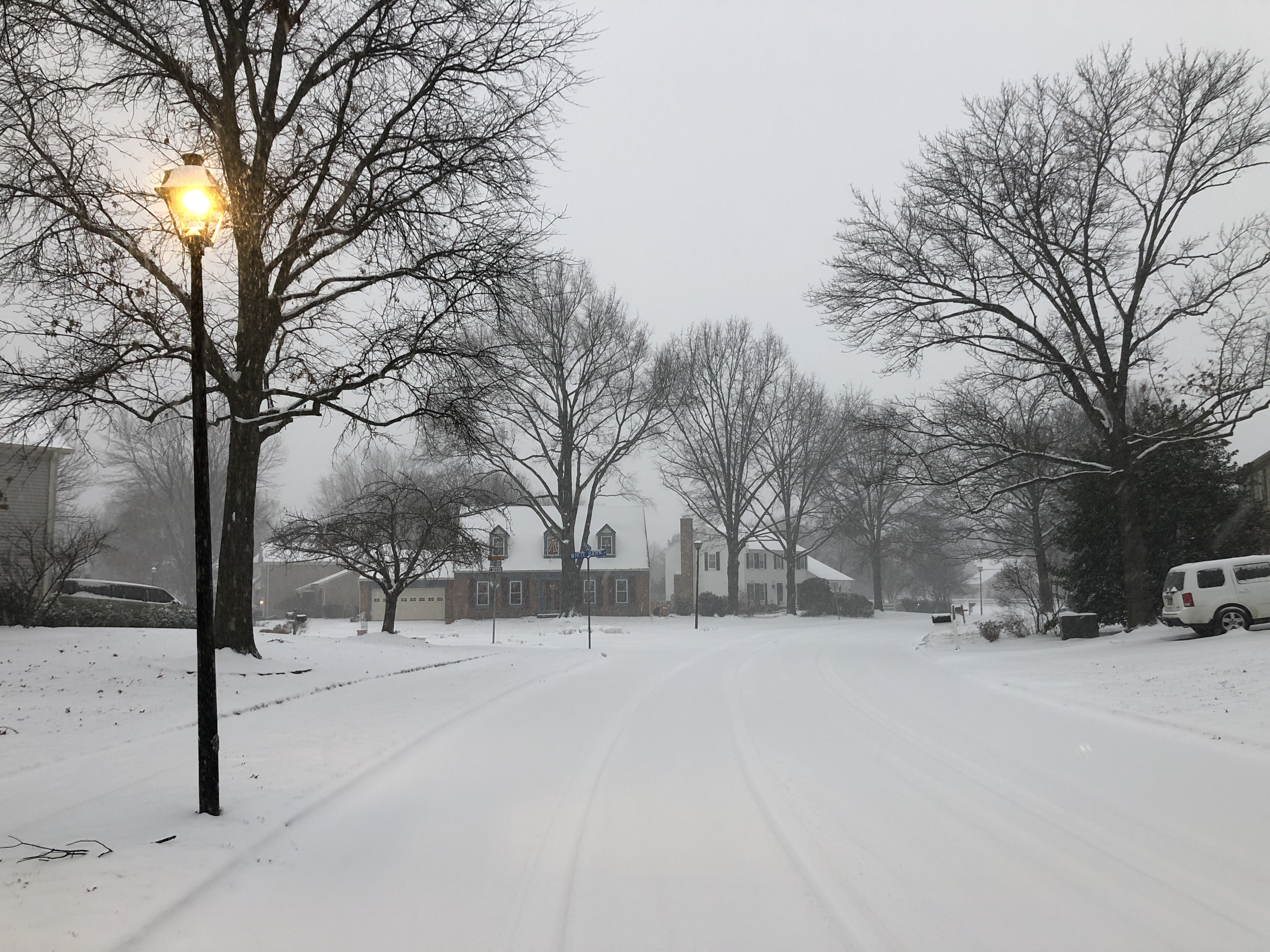
Snowfall from the winter storm in Oak Hill, Fairfax County, Virginia on January 16

==== High Plains and Midwest ====
The storm dropped 11 inches (28 cm) of snow in Laurens, Iowa and 14.3 inches (36 cm) in Des Moines. There were also 78 car crashes reported, which caused 14 injures.

Heavy snow was recorded across eastern Ohio, where 15 inches (38 cm) fell at Cleveland and 13.6 inches (35 cm) at Akron-Canton. Parts of Ashtabula County reported 27.5 inches (70 cm) of snow.

==== Southeast ====
The Nashville Fire Department in Davidson County, Tennessee, opened a shelter from the cold weather on January 15.

Snow fell in mostly the northern and central part of Alabama with only a trace recorded in most areas. York recorded 1.5 inches (3.8 cm) while Livingston recorded 2.0 inches (5.1 cm).

In Georgia, approximately 100,000 customers were without power at the height of the storm on January 16. Atlanta recorded 0.3 inches (0.76 cm) of snow from the storm, which became the first measurable snow at the airport since January 2018.

In North Carolina, parts of U.S. Route 276 were closed due to icing. The city of Charlotte opened a shelter for those who sought warmth from the cold. The North Carolina Highway Patrol responded to approximately 200 collisions by noon of January 16. A car crash also killed 2 people in Raleigh, North Carolina. Over 90% of flights that day from Charlotte Douglas International Airport were cancelled.

A state of emergency was declared in Virginia due to the storm. Virginia reported 482 car crashes and 486 disabled vehicles.

===== Florida =====
The warm side of the storm caused severe thunderstorms, high winds, and several tornadoes in Florida. An EF2 tornado touched down in Iona, damaging numerous homes and causing three injuries. Around 7,000 homes lost power in the state. The Iona tornado caused $10 million in damage. Some parts of the Panhandle saw flurries while in areas in northern Escambia County saw light accumulation, the first snow accumulation observed in the state since a winter storm in 2018.

==== Northeast ====
Sustained Winds at Pemaquid Point Light in Bristol, Maine

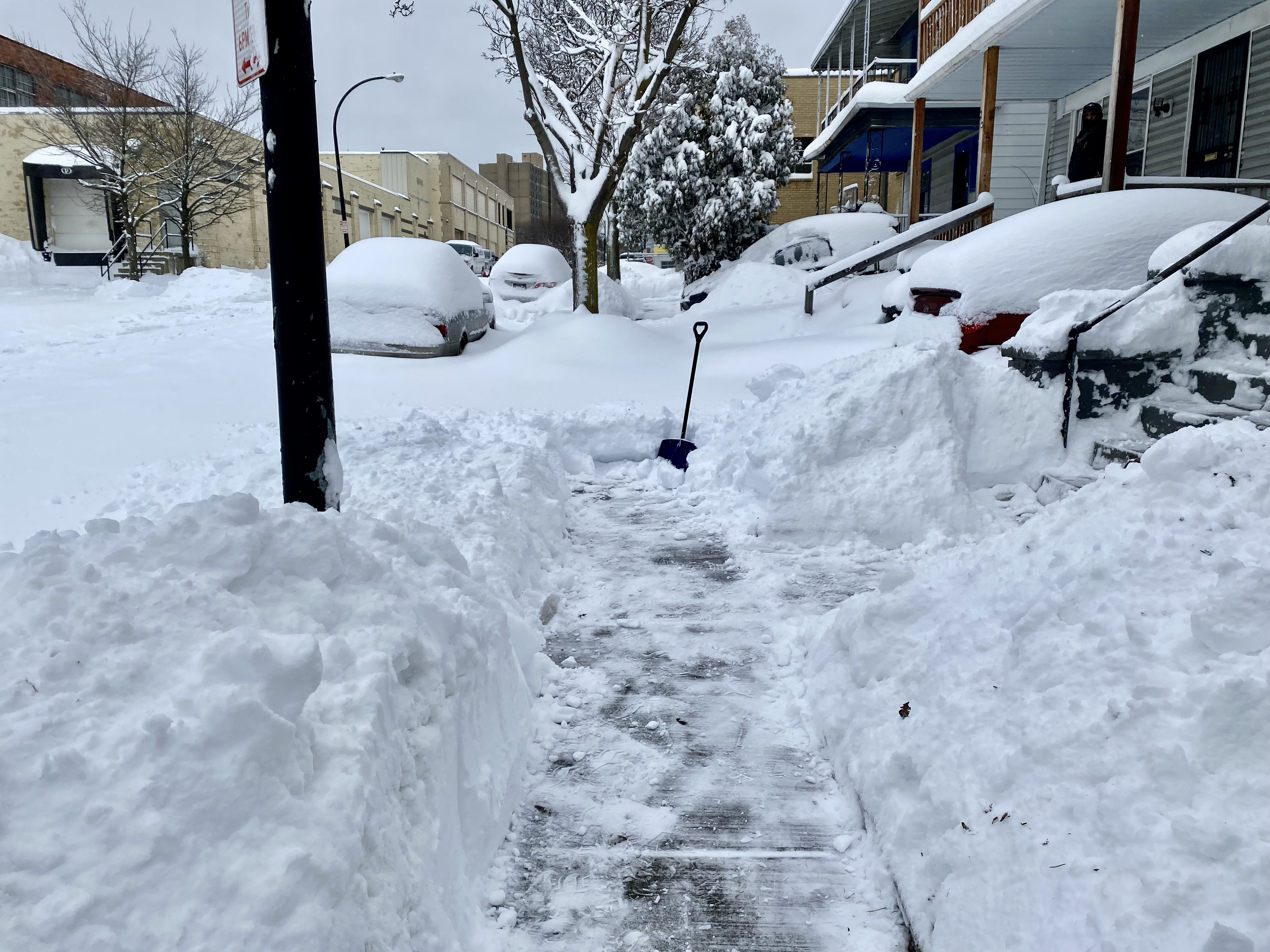
A thick layer of snow covers the sidewalk, parked cars, and front yards on Laurel Street in Buffalo, New York, as seen on the afternoon of January 17.

Buffalo received 19.2 inches (49 cm) of snow while areas to the east of Buffalo, such as Medina (22 inches (56 cm)) and Batavia (17 inches (43 cm)) received similar amounts, while Rochester further east received 11.5 inches (29 cm) inches of snow. Snow was reported falling at as much as 4.6 inches (12 cm) per hour in the early hours of January 17 in Buffalo. Schools in the Buffalo area were closed both January 17 and 18 due to the storm. The storm was the third snowiest January day in Buffalo history. Albany, New York, received 4 inches (10 cm) of snow while mountain areas to its west and east received between 10 inches (25 cm) and 14 inches (36 cm). New York City received less than 1 inch (2.5 cm) of snow after which it received rain and experienced wind gusts approaching 60 miles per hour (97 km/h), prompting COVID-19 vaccination and testing sites to close temporarily. In Staten Island, where temperatures remained 38 °F (3 °C) or higher during the event, significant rainfall of 2.06 inches (52 mm) fell. In Suffolk County, New York, a 60 knot wind gust was confirmed at 3:46 a.m. EST on January 17.

== Confirmed tornadoes ==
Confirmed tornadoes by Enhanced Fujita rating
EFU	EF0	EF1	EF2	EF3	EF4	EF5	Total
0	3	3	1	0	0	0	7

=== January 16 event ===
List of confirmed tornadoes – Sunday, January 16, 2022 (Note: All dates are based on the local time zone where the tornado touched down; however, all times are in Coordinated Universal Time for consistency.)
EF#	Location	County / Parish	State	Start Coord.	Time (UTC)	Path length	Max width
EF1	SE of Carrabelle	Franklin	FL	29.7986°N 84.6027°W	05:22–05:26	2.65 mi (4.26 km)	50 yd (46 m)
EF1	One home on Dog Island sustained significant damage to its porch and had its roof partially removed. Trees and power lines were damaged along the path.						
EF1	Placida	Charlotte	FL	26.8299°N 82.2635°W	11:37–11:42	0.97 mi (1.56 km)	50 yd (46 m)
EF1	A waterspout came onshore near a marina where several boats were damaged, including one that was flipped. At least 35 homes were damaged as it struck a manufactured home community before dissipating.						
EF1	SW of Port Charlotte	Charlotte	FL	26.9185°N 82.2206°W	12:15–12:16	0.54 mi (0.87 km)	50 yd (46 m)
EF1	This tornado came from the same storm that produced the previous tornado. Four homes were damaged, two of which sustained major damage, with the other two sustaining minor damage. Several roofs and carports were either heavily damaged or destroyed.						
EF2	SE of Punta Rassa to McGregor	Lee	FL	26.4817°N 81.986°W	12:32–12:48	7.01 mi (11.28 km)	125 yd (114 m)
EF2	This strong tornado began as a waterspout over the Gulf of Mexico before moving inland. The tornado moved through three different mobile home communities in Iona, just southwest of Fort Myers, impacting at least 108 mobile homes. Of those, 30 were completely demolished, including some that were swept from their foundations, and 51 suffered major damage. Three people were injured. Mainly horticulture damage occurred in McGregor before the tornado dissipated near the Cape Coral Bridge. This tornado caused $10 million in damage.						
EF0	NNW of Cape Coral	Lee	FL	26.62°N 82.00°W	14:04–14:05	0.46 mi (0.74 km)	50 yd (46 m)
EF0	A brief tornado captured by doorbell security video caused sporadic minor damage.						
EF0	SW of Lely to E of Naples	Collier	FL	26.02°N 81.767°W	14:07–14:34	15 mi (24 km)	75 yd (69 m)
EF0	Two homes sustained roof damage and a few small trees were uprooted. Large branches were sheared off of several trees. A semi-truck was flipped on Interstate 75, injuring the driver.						
EF0	W of Everglades City to W of Ochopee	Collier	FL	25.86°N 81.41°W	14:53–15:01	5.5 mi (8.9 km)	75 yd (69 m)
EF0	A tornado was caught on video. An NWS damage survey found a leaning power pole.						

== See also ==
- Weather of 2022
- List of North American tornadoes and tornado outbreaks
- February 2014 nor'easter
- February 2015 Southeastern United States winter storm
- February 13–17, 2021 North American winter storm
- Great Snowstorm of 1944
