= 2021–22 North American winter =

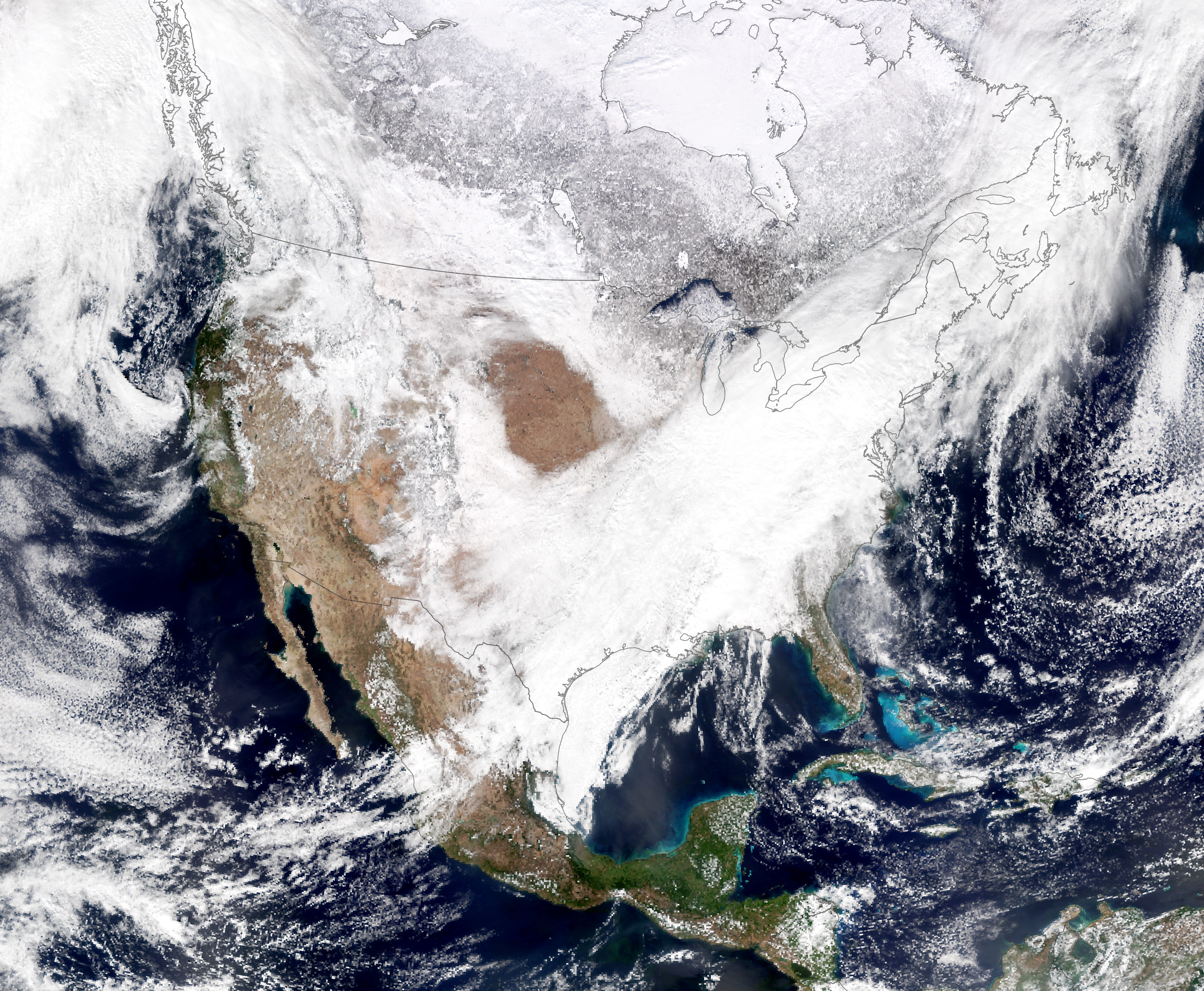
- NOAA-20 satellite image of a massive winter storm affecting much of North America on February 3, 2022

Seasonal boundaries
- Meteorological winter: December 1 – February 28
- Astronomical winter: December 21 – March 20
- First event started: October 24, 2021
- Last event concluded: May 21, 2022

Most notable event
- Name: January 2022 North American blizzard
  - Duration: January 27–30, 2022
  - Lowest pressure: 969 mb (28.61 inHg)
  - Fatalities: 4 fatalities
  - Damage: $50 million (2022 USD)

Seasonal statistics
- Total WPC-issued storms: 18 total
- Rated storms (RSI) (Cat. 1+): 6 total
- Major storms (RSI) (Cat. 3+): 0 total
- Maximum snowfall accumulation: 60 inches (150 cm) east of Pinecrest, California (December 13–18, 2021)
- Maximum ice accretion: 0.8 inches (20 mm) in Lake Ariel, Pennsylvania (February 1–5, 2022)
- Total fatalities: 41 total
- Total damage: ≥ $1.97 billion (2022 USD)

Related articles
- 2021–22 European windstorm season

The 2021–22 North American winter was not as significant and record-breaking as the previous winter season. Despite this, several notable and significant events still occurred, including two separate record-breaking tornado outbreaks in mid-December, a significant winter storm in the South in mid-January, a powerful blizzard that impacted the Northeast coast at the end of January and a wide-ranging, significant winter storm that affected most of the eastern half of the country in early February. Additional significant events included a late-season winter storm in March that affected the Appalachian Mountains, and a major blizzard that affected North and South Dakota in mid-April. Additionally, a very late out-of-season snowstorm struck the Rocky Mountains in late May. During the season, four storms have been ranked on the Regional Snowfall Index (RSI), although none attained the “Major” category. Similar to the previous winter, a developing La Niña was expected to influence weather patterns across the continent.

Based on the astronomical definition, winter began on the winter solstice on December 21, 2021 and ended on the spring equinox on March 20, 2022. Based on the meteorological definition, the first day of winter started on December 1 and the last day was February 28. These dates historically describe the period in each year when winter storms are most likely to occur. However, winter storms may occur outside of these limits, as shown by the early formation of this season's mid-October winter storm on October 12. Since both definitions of winter span the start of the calendar year, it is possible to have a winter storm spanning two different years. In addition, major winter events can occur well after the official start of spring, as close as June in some cases, as shown by a very late-season winter storm that impacted Colorado in late May 2022 with heavy snow following warm temperatures just a day beforehand.

== Seasonal forecasts ==
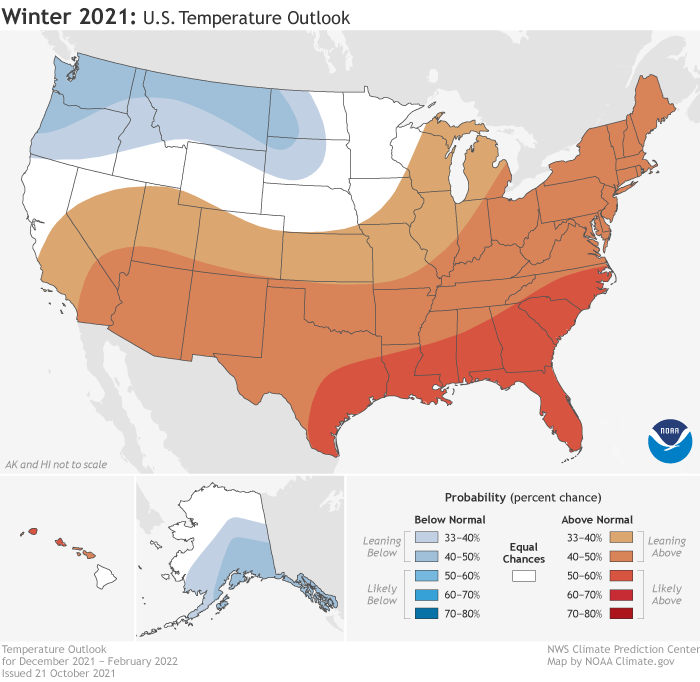
Temperature outlook

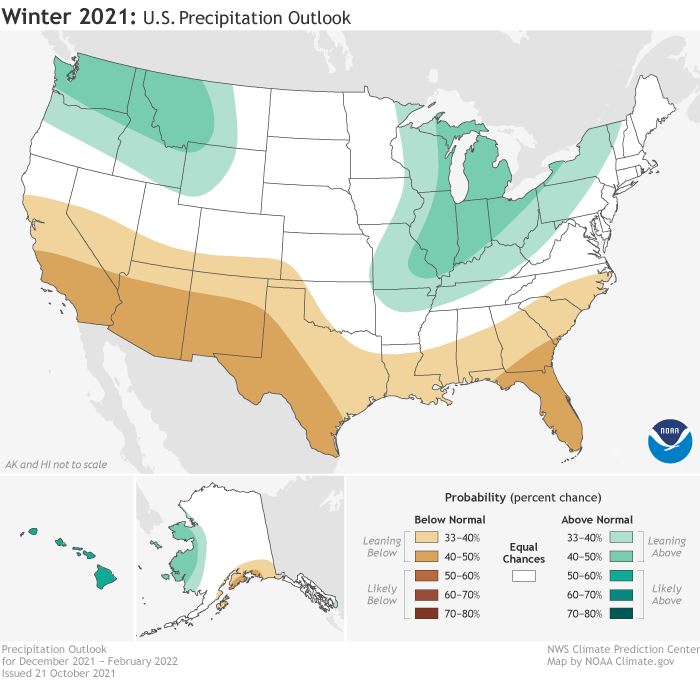
Precipitation outlook

On October 13, 2021, The Weather Channel (TWC) released its U.S. winter temperature outlooks for the 2021–22 winter season. The forecasts reflected the likelihood of a weak La Niña pattern and weak polar vortex during much of the season. Overall for the winter, significantly above-average temperatures were forecast for most of the Southern Tier, with near-average temperatures in the Central and much of the Northeastern United States. Slightly below-average temperatures were expected in most of the north-central and northwestern U.S. During the first half of the season, a relatively weak La Niña was expected to result in widespread below-average temperatures across the northern half of the country, with widespread above-average temperatures in the southern half. However, as both the La Niña and polar vortex were expected to strengthen later in the season, widespread above-average temperatures were forecast in most of the U.S. during the latter half of the winter, especially in the South and East. Below-average temperatures were still expected to continue in the far Northwestern U.S.

On October 21, 2021, the National Oceanic and Atmospheric Administration's Climate Prediction Center released its U.S. Winter Outlook for the upcoming winter. The temperature and precipitation outlooks reflected a typical La Niña weather pattern during the winter. Significantly above-average temperatures were forecasted across the Southern Tier, especially in the Southeast, with slightly above-average temperatures forecast in the Ohio Valley and Northeast. Near to below-average temperatures were expected in the far northwestern U.S. Below-average precipitation was expected across the far Southern Tier, with particularly in the Southwest, with above-average precipitation forecast in the far Northwestwern U.S., as well as the Ohio Valley and surrounding regions. Near-average precipitation was expected in the Central U.S., Northern Plains, and Northeast. Drought was forecasted to improve and end in the Pacific Northwest, while it was expected to develop or worsen across the Southwest. Drought was not expected in the eastern half of the country.

== Seasonal summary ==
The 2021–22 winter season began with the formation of a significant winter storm in the Western United States on October 12, resulting in heavy snow accumulations of up to 28 in (71 cm) across much of the Intermountain West and over 80 rescues due to blizzard-like conditions in Utah. The system was estimated to have caused at least $50 million in damages. After a one-month break in winter weather events due to unfavorable conditions for winter storms, a blizzard began to develop across south-central Canada and the Upper Midwest on November 11. December 2021 saw a record warm month across the Lower 48. Ten states (New Mexico, Texas, Louisiana, Mississippi, Alabama, Oklahoma, Arkansas, Missouri, Kansas, and Nebraska) saw record warm December's. An early December heat wave set all-time record highs in Montana, Washington, Wyoming, and North Dakota. Parts of British Columbia saw temperatures of 22.5 °C (72.5 °F), tying it for an all time Canadian high in December. In early-to-mid December, a major system produced a historic tornado outbreak along with wintry weather in the Upper Midwest, followed by another powerful storm that produced an ever larger tornado outbreak along with strong winds across the High Plains just a few days later. The storm, being a category 3 atmospheric river event, brought heavy rain and snowfall to the Western United States. Over 8 inches (20 cm) of rain during the storm were recorded on Mount Tamalpais, a mountain in the San Francisco Bay Area, with San Francisco itself receiving around two inches of rain from the event. Around 60 inches (150 cm) of snow was recorded in Pinecrest, California. The storm caused statewide snowpack in California to increase from 19% of normal to 83% of normal.

Later that month and into early January, a series of winter storms brought a cold snap and heavy snowfall to parts of the West Coast, particularly areas in the Pacific Northwest region. Several weather stations in Washington state recorded record-breaking low temperatures for December 26 and 27, with temperatures at 17 °F (−8 °C) in Seattle and 7 °F (−14 °C) in Bellingham. This became Seattle's coldest day in 31 years, because the high for the day was only 23 °F (−5 °C). Seattle recorded 9.2 inches (23 cm) of snow in December, exceeding the city's normal winter average, while some parts of the region had more than 1 foot (0.30 m). With five days of snow in a row, Seattle saw the most consecutive snowy days on record since 1969. Another storm on January 6 led to the closure of several mountain passes in the Cascade Range, leaving only one east–west route across Washington. Snoqualmie Pass reopened to limited traffic four days later. In Vancouver, British Columbia, the temperature dropped to −15.3 °C (4.5 °F) on December 27, the coldest temperature there since 1969.

Before additional snow events occurred throughout January, with below-average temperatures being common, Falcon Lake, Texas, set a record for the highest January temperature in the contiguous United States on January 1, at 99.0 °F (37.2 °C). One such storm in January was the a significant winter storm in the eastern half of the country in mid-January with snow and ice, causing Georgia, Virginia, North Carolina and South Carolina to all declare a state of emergency in preparation for the winter storm. The most significant event occurred at the end of the month, when a major blizzard struck the Northeastern United States on January 28–29. This storm brought up to 1–3 inches (2.5–7.6 cm) across a swath of New England and caused widespread impacts. Blizzard conditions were confirmed at multiple locations in New England, including Providence, Boston, and Worcester, in addition to some areas on the Jersey Shore receiving blizzard conditions. In early February, another major winter storm affected the country, with areas as far south as Texas to as far north as Maine receiving significant snowfall, though in the former it was not as bad as the previous year's storm which crippled the state's power grid. Howard Pass, Alaska saw a wind chill of −91 °F (−68 °C) on February 7.

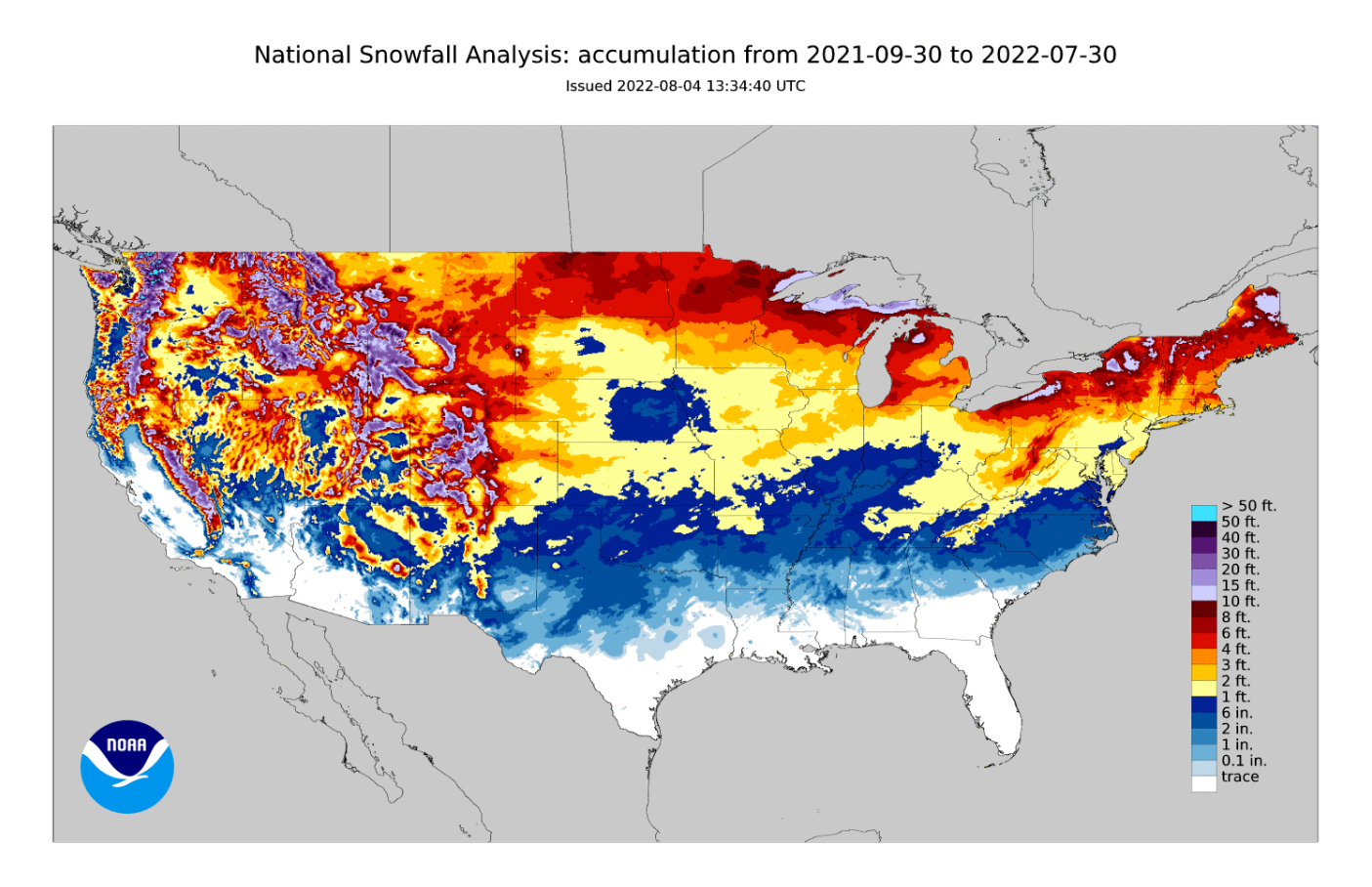
Total snowfall for the 2021–22 winter season in the United States

The rest of February saw less significant wintry events aside from a few concentrated snowstorms in some areas, particularly the Northeast, but activity increased again in mid-March after a significant winter storm affected a wide swath of areas from Louisiana to Maine, dropping widespread snow amounts of 6–18 inches (15–46 cm). After a few late-season cold snaps, a a major blizzard struck the Dakotas in mid-April, dropping as much as 40 inches (100 cm) of snow, unusual for so late in the season. The last significant event occurred in late May after a record-late snowstorm struck Colorado just days after temperatures had been near 90 °F (32 °C). However, on June 19, 2022, a hiker died due to hypothermia in Maine, and temperatures below freezing were recorded that morning in Canaan Valley in West Virginia, Mount Washington in New Hampshire, and Waverly, New York. Caribou, Maine, saw their latest day where the high failed to reach 50 °F (10 °C), with highs of 49 °F (9 °C).

== Events ==
=== Late October West Coast bomb cyclone ===
- Category 0 "Nuisance" (RSI/NOAA: N/A)
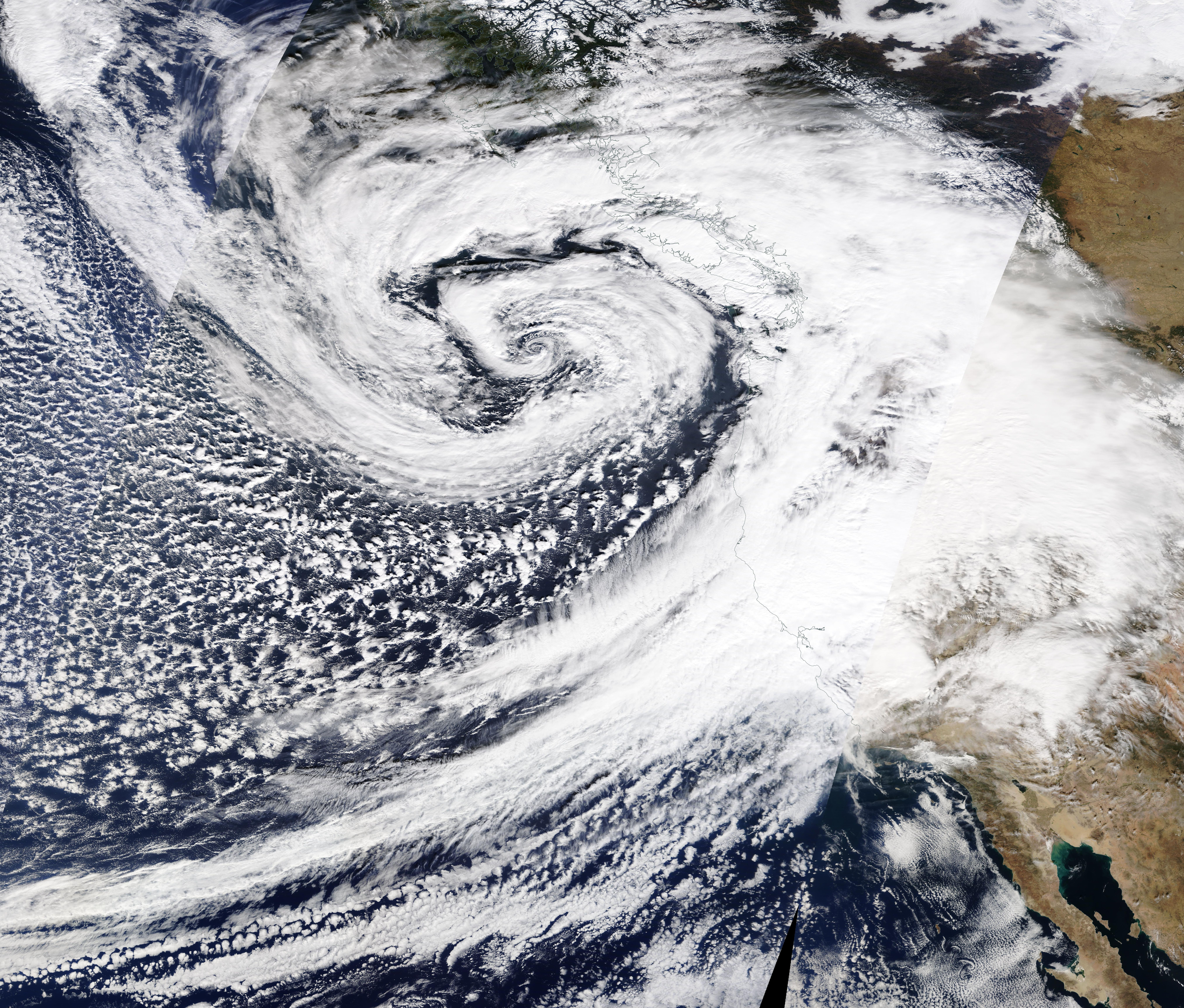
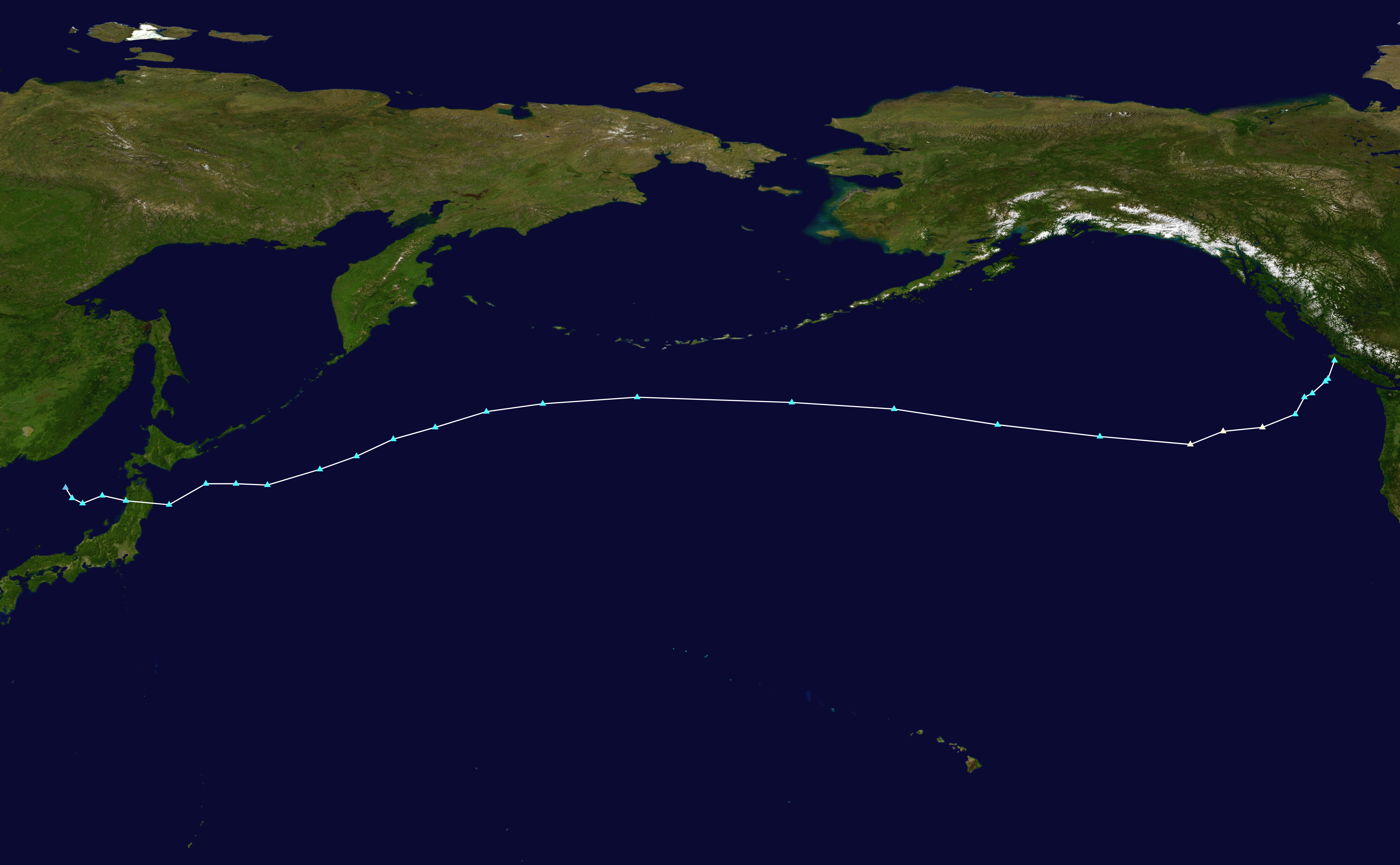
- Duration: October 23 – October 26, 2021
- Lowest pressure: 942 mb (27.82 inHg)
- Maximum snow: 42 in (110 cm)
- Fatalities: 2 fatalities
- Damage: $400 million (2021 USD)

In late October 2021, a powerful bomb cyclone struck the Western United States and Western Canada, bringing severe impacts to the region. The cyclone tapped into a large atmospheric river and underwent explosive intensification, becoming a bomb cyclone on October 24. The bomb cyclone had a minimum central pressure of 942 millibars (27.8 inHg) at its peak, making it the most powerful cyclone recorded in the Northeast Pacific. The system had severe impacts across Western North America, before dissipating on October 26. The storm shattered multiple pressure records across parts of the Pacific Northwest. Additionally, the bomb cyclone was the most powerful storm on record to strike the region, in terms of minimum central pressure. The bomb cyclone brought powerful gale-force winds and flooding to portions of Western North America. At its height, the storm cut the power to over 370,500 customers across the Western U.S. and British Columbia. The storm killed at least two people; damage from the storm was estimated at four hundred million dollars (2021 USD). The bomb cyclone was compared to the Columbus Day Storm of 1962, in terms of ferocity.

=== Pre-Halloween nor'easter (Tropical Storm Wanda) ===
- Category 0 "Nuisance" (RSI/NOAA: N/A)
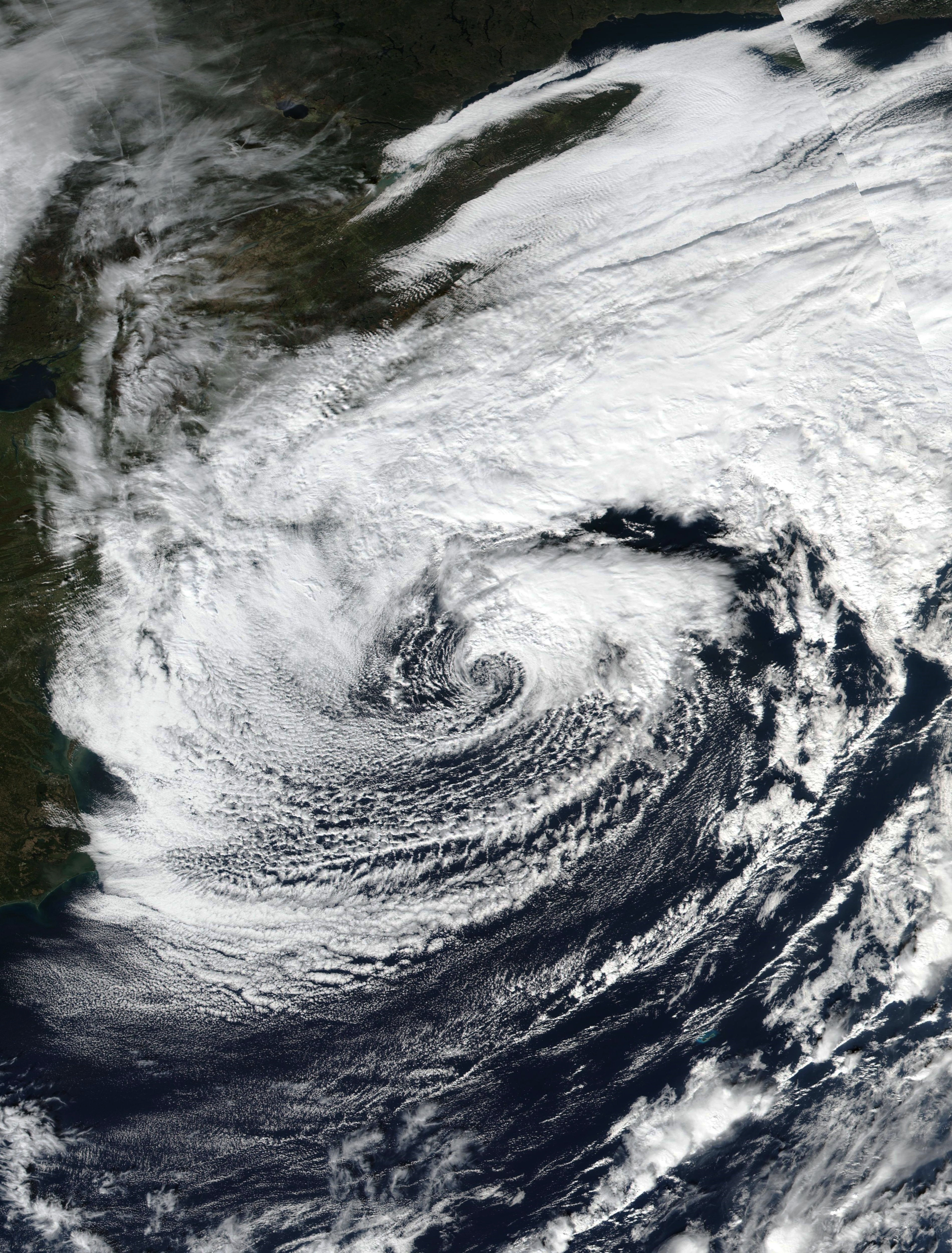
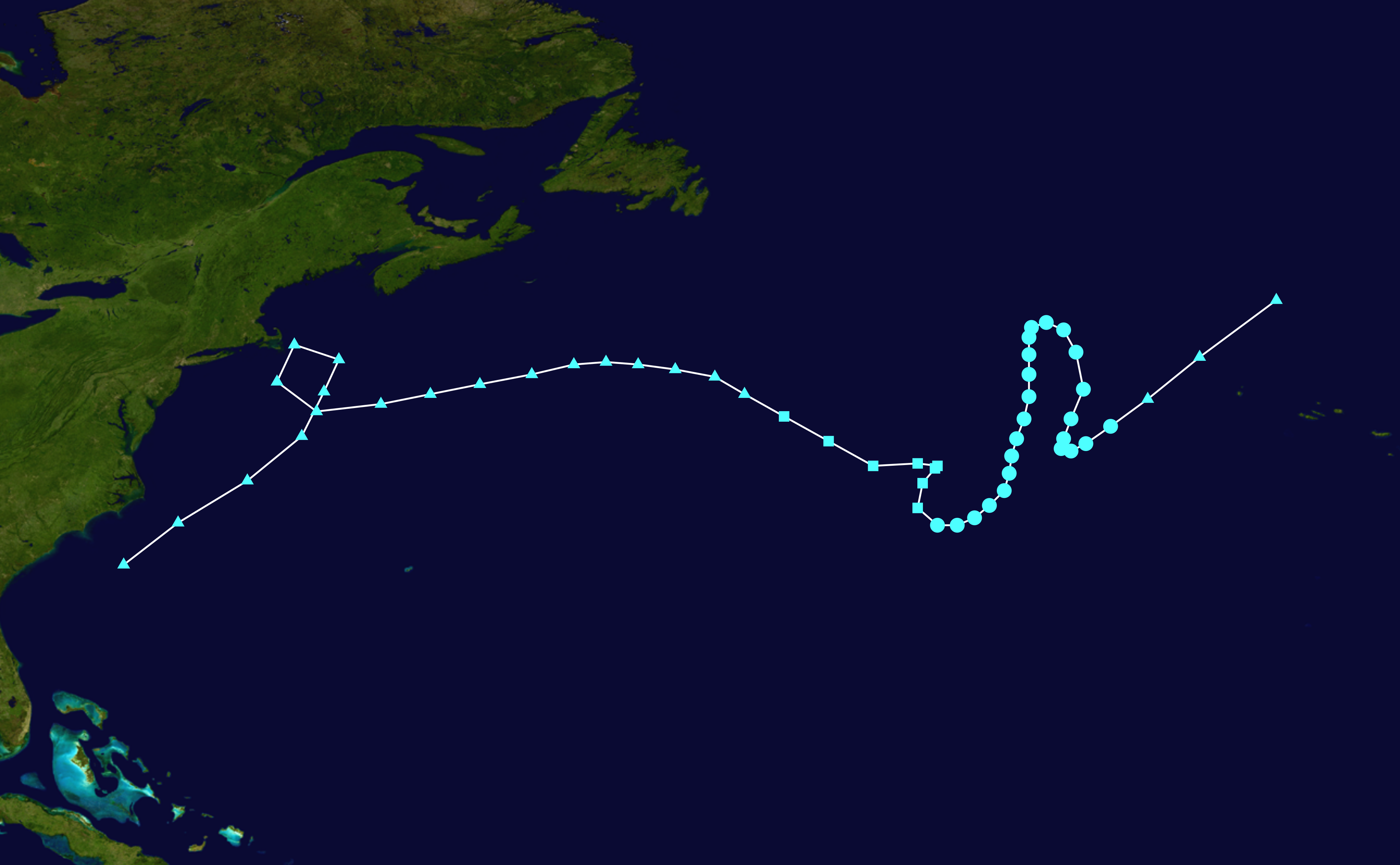
- Duration: October 25 – October 28, 2021
- Lowest pressure: 983 mb (29.03 inHg)
- Fatalities: 2 fatalities
- Damage: > $200 million (2021 USD)

A strong nor'easter in late October brought high winds, cutting power to more than 600,000 people in New England. Category 3 hurricane-force wind gusts of 113 mph (182 km/h) were recorded in Truro, Massachusetts, 103 mph (166 km/h) in Duxbury, Massachusetts, and 97 mph (156 km/h) in Wellfleet, Massachusetts. Martha's Vineyard, Massachusetts reported a wind gust to 94 mph (151 km/h) and Scituate reported a gust of 87 mph (140 km/h). Unofficial wind gusts of 110 mph (180 km/h) in Wellfleet and 107 mph (172 km/h) in Provincetown, Massachusetts were recorded at exposed coastal locations.

A plane was damaged at the New Bedford Regional Airport after being blown off the runway. In Hingham, a large tree brought down wires. According to Aon Benfield, damage was estimated at over $200 million (2021 USD). The system would later move out to sea and acquire subtropical characteristics, becoming Subtropical Storm Wanda on October 31, later becoming a full-fledged tropical cyclone two days later. The precursor of Wanda caused a lot of flooding in the tri-state area with heavy amounts of rain, which killed two people.

=== Mid-December storm complex ===
- Category 0 "Nuisance" (RSI/NOAA: N/A)
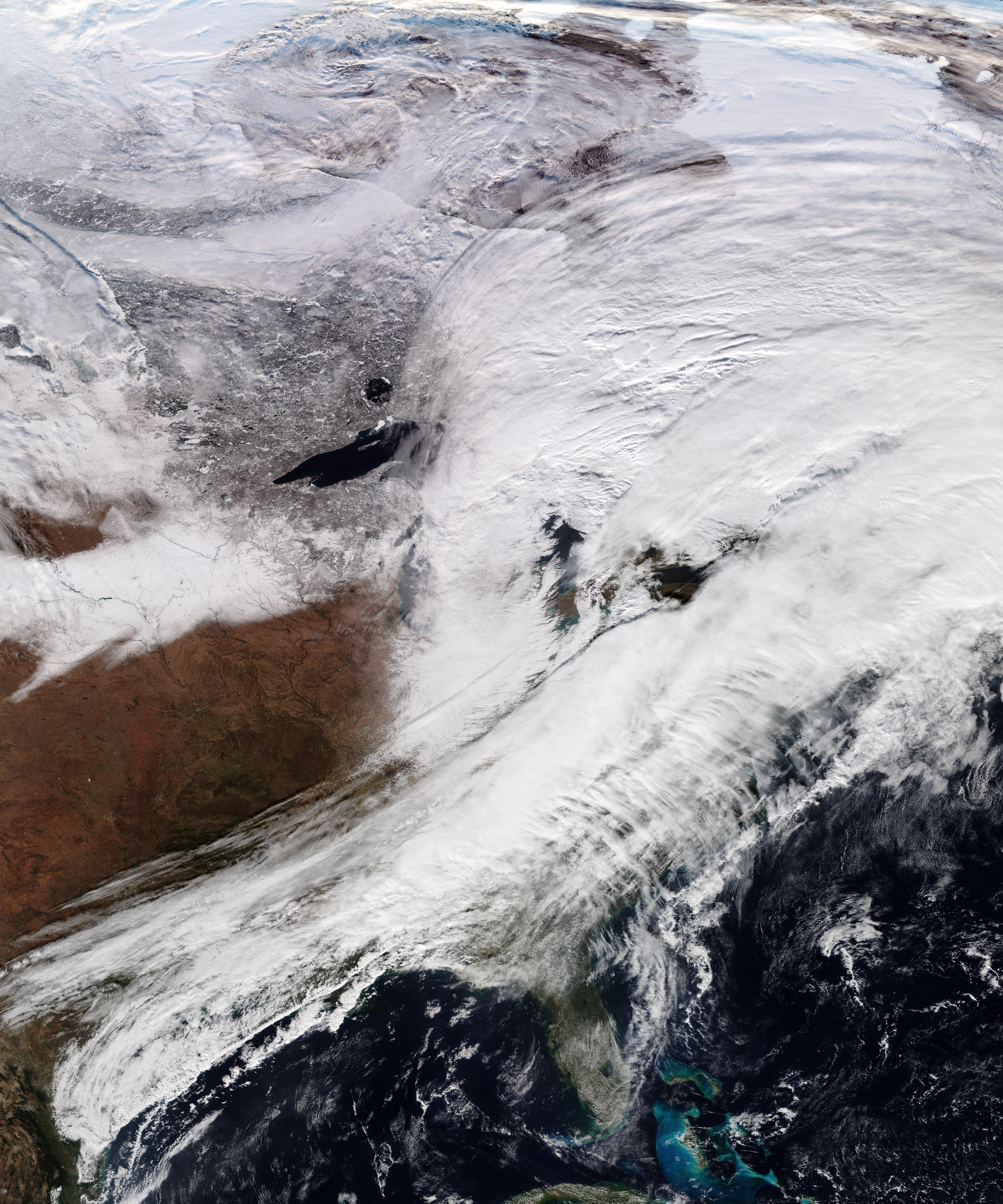
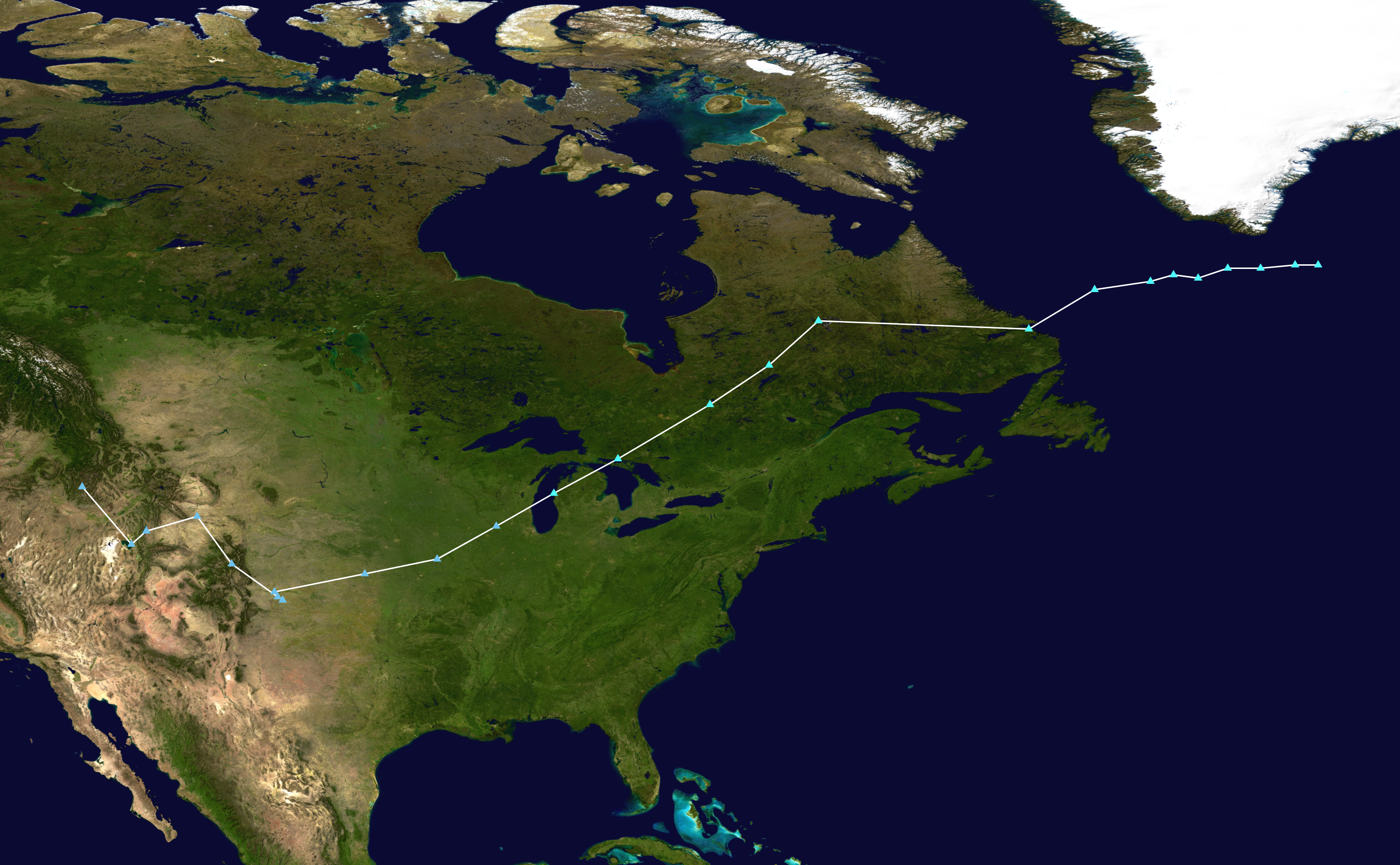
- Duration: December 9 – December 12, 2021
- Lowest pressure: 974 mb (28.76 inHg)
- Maximum snow: 36 in (91 cm)

In mid-December, a large storm complex produced a devastating tornado outbreak in the South. On the wintry side, a prolific snowstorm occurred within the Plains and Upper Midwest, entering the Western United States on December 9. The storm brought the first measurable snowfall of the rainy season to Utah. In southern Wyoming and Colorado, the storm dropped a maximum total of 3 feet (0.91 m) of snow in the mountains.

In Minnesota, some towns and cities received over one foot (30 cm) of snow. The Twin Cities received a maximum total of 21 inches (53 cm) of snow, making the winter storm the heaviest snowstorm recorded in the area since another blizzard in April 2018. Minneapolis and St. Paul each declared snow emergencies. In the Twin Cities, Metro Transit reported that half of its busses were delayed. More than 250 flights were canceled at Minneapolis–Saint Paul International Airport. Near Faribault, a seven-car pileup occurred on Interstate 35. Minnesota State Patrol reported 232 crashes, causing 19 injuries. The National Weather Service issued winter storm warnings for part of Minnesota during the December 10.

=== Early January nor'easters ===
==== First storm (January 3–4) ====
- Category 1 "Notable" (RSI/NOAA: 2.325)
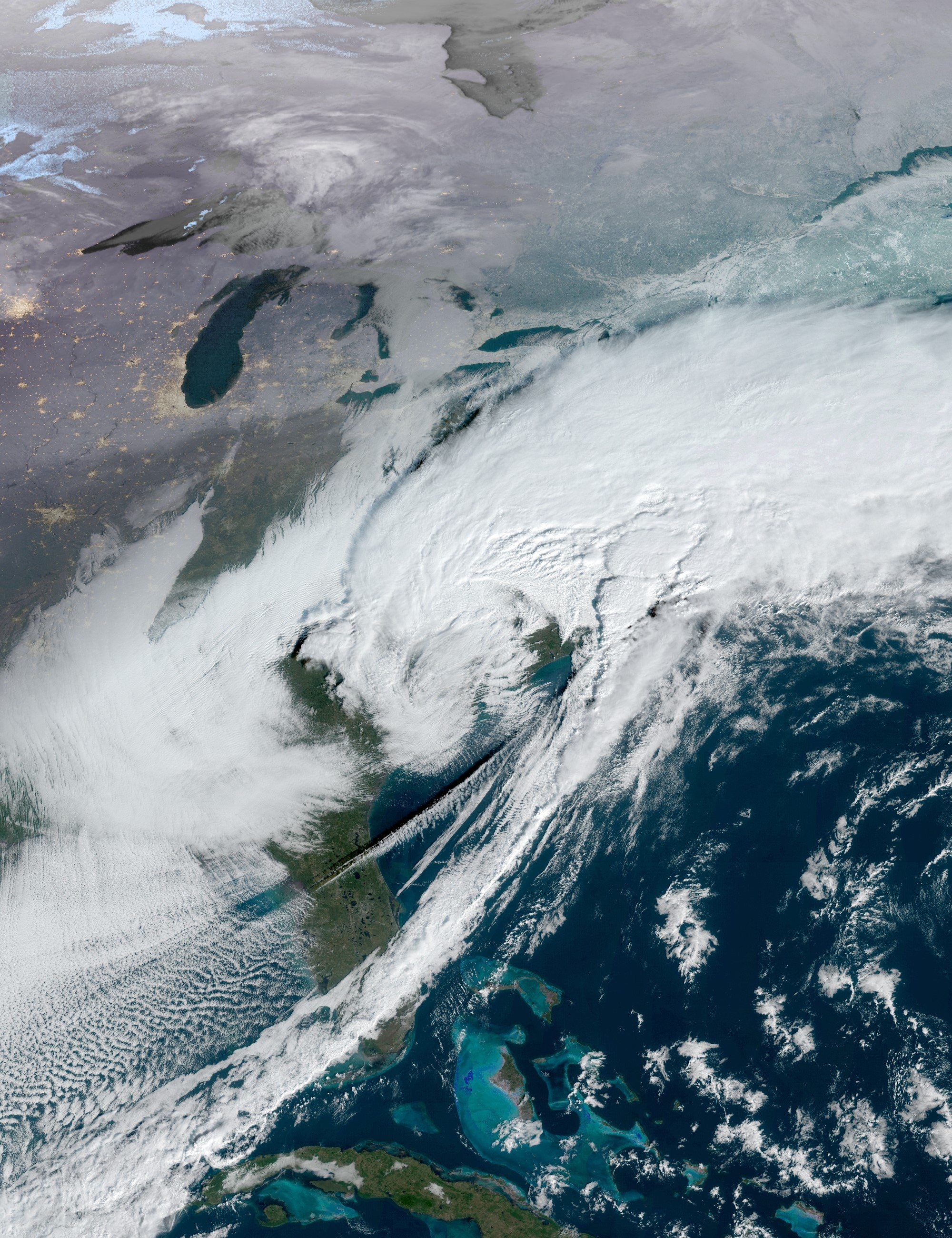
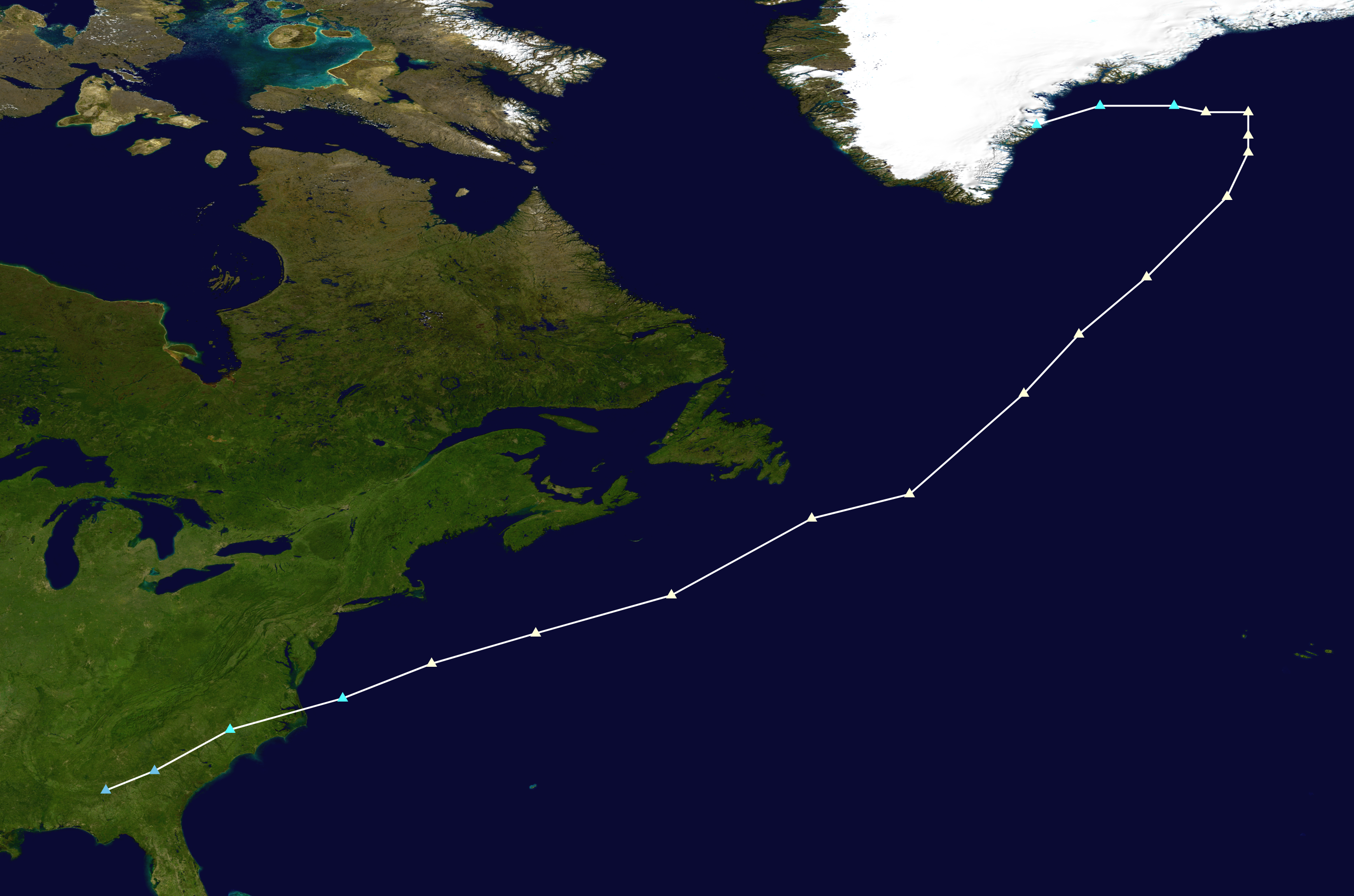
- Duration: January 3 – January 4, 2022
- Maximum snow: 15.5 in (39 cm)
- Fatalities: 5 fatalities
- Damage: $495 million (2022 USD)

A nor'easter exited the east coast of the United States on January 4, producing snowfall from Alabama to New England, with as much as 6.0 inches (15 cm) accumulating in Huntsville, Alabama and 6.9 inches (18 cm) falling at Ronald Reagan Washington National Airport. A peak snowfall accumulation of 15.5 in (39 cm) was recorded in Huntingtown, Maryland. Many vehicles and motorists across Interstate 95 in Virginia were stranded due to the snow, with some of them for 24 hours. Over 1,000 motor crashes were also reported and assisted by the state's police. It also caused 3 people to die in a car crash in Maryland. Two others died in the winter storm, one each in Tennessee and Georgia, bringing the total up to 5. Snow even fell as far south as Fort Walton Beach, Florida, where temperatures dropped from 75 °F (24 °C) to 34 °F (1 °C). Thousands of flights were canceled in the eastern United States. At the Baltimore Washington International Airport, a ground stop was temporarily instituted. This storm came after a day of record high temperatures; the temperature in Huntsville, Alabama the day before the storm (January 1) was 79 °F (26 °C), a record for January. The winter storm was unofficially named Winter Storm Frida by The Weather Channel. It also caused 343,000 power outages in Virginia and 42,000 in Maryland. North-central, northeast and northwest portions of Georgia were placed under winter storm warnings by the National Weather Service there on 1 January. Over 59,000 household customers lost electricity across Charlotte City, with 159,000 overall over the Carolinas. Some establishments were completely wrecked by the strong winds the storm brought, and trees were reported to have been downed. This further rose to 211,000 by 3 January and lessened to 2,500 as rescue teams started working to restore electricity. In Ellendale, Delaware, 14.5 inches (37 cm) of snow fell on 3 January. This led to a chicken house collapse on 4 January which trapped a 12-year-old girl. According to Aon Bonfield, damage from the storm reached $495 million.

Farther north, in Iceland, news about the storm were dispatched across the country's people as a preparation. The south and western parts of Iceland were also placed under an orange warning by the Icelandic Meteorological Office by 5 January. The Icelandic Coast Guard also alerted vessels and fishermen in ports regarding the brunt of it. Icelandair also canceled some flight operations by that day owing to the storm. In the southwest portion of the country, rescue teams were reported to have been responding to the calls by the citizens there regarding the impact of the storm. Across Reykjavík, they responded to flying roofs of different houses and establishments. Suðurnes (Southern Peninsula) and Vestmannaeyjar (Westman Islands) were also severely affected. A hut was also blown away by strong winds in Vatnsleysuströnd. The country's eastern portion meanwhile, was battered by rough waves from the storm. Harbours at Hafnarhólmur sustained "biggest" damages, as well as some vessels docked there. Rocks from the shores also pushed over the area's roadways; this was cleaned up subsequently.

==== Second storm (January 4–7) ====
- Category 1 "Notable" (RSI/NOAA: 1.466)
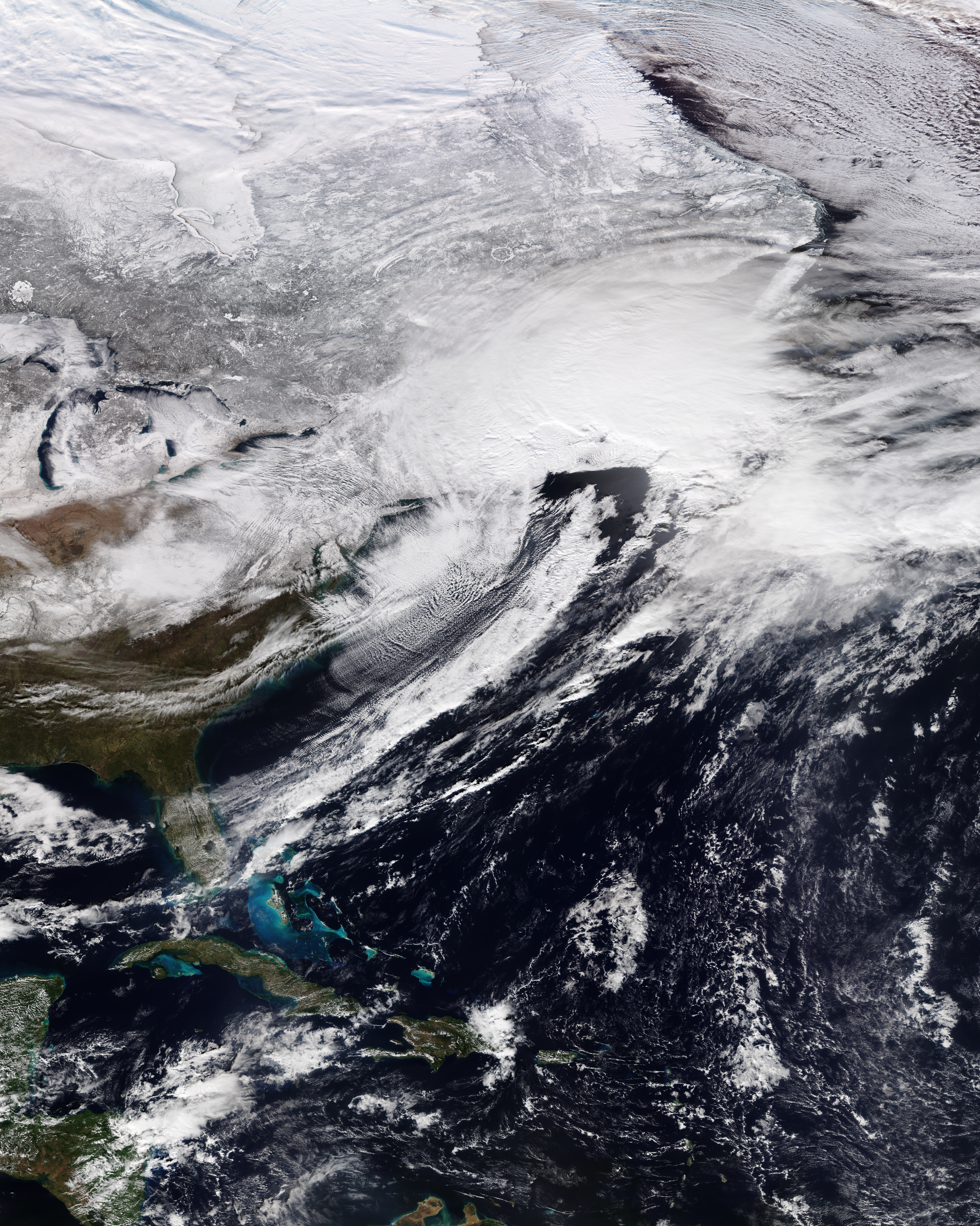
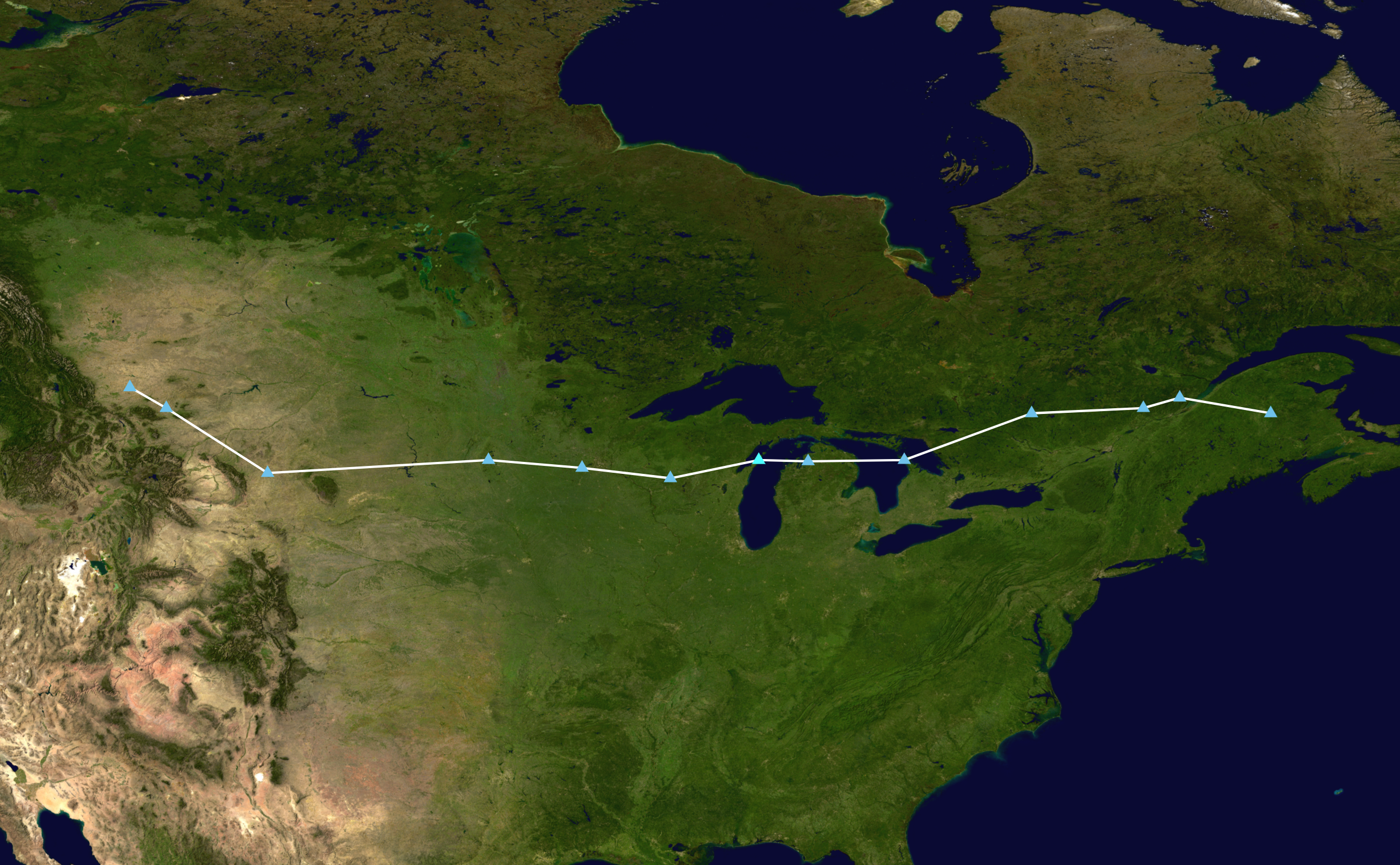
- Duration: January 4 – January 7, 2022
- Lowest pressure: 968 mb (28.59 inHg)
- Maximum snow: 17.7 in (45 cm)
- Fatalities: 1 fatalities

A winter storm, unofficially named Winter Storm Garrett by The Weather Channel impacted the Ohio Valley and Northeastern United States starting on January 6. The storm dropped nearly ten inches of snow on Lexington, Kentucky, causing 250 car crashes which led to 18 injuries. Portions of Interstate 64 and Interstate 75 closed down. Nashville saw 6.3 inches (16 cm), which is more than an average years winter. Snow fell at two inches per hour. Freezing rain also fell in the Memphis metropolitan area. The storm also dropped 6+ inches (15+ centimeters) of snow on the eastern New York metropolitan area, with the city center receiving 5.8 inches (15 cm). Parts of Connecticut saw over a foot of snow and of Long Island saw up to 9.3 inches (240 mm) of snow, with LaGuardia Airport recording 9.7 inches (25 cm). Meanwhile, parts of the Philadelphia metro area saw 3–5 inches (7.6–12.7 cm) of snow. Meanwhile, further north, parts of southeastern Massachusetts got hit with up to 13 inches (33 cm) of snow, with the city of Boston itself seeing 11.7 inches (30 cm). A car crash on Massachusetts Route 140 caused one fatality. Another person was injured in a crash along the Pennsylvania Turnpike.

=== January cold wave ===
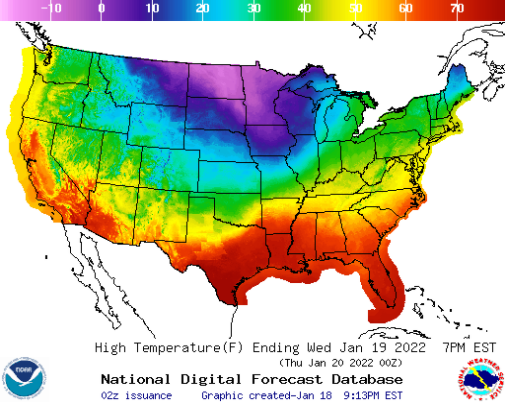
Map of the cold temperatures across the United States on January 19

Throughout the month of January, temperatures frequently were below-average in much of the Eastern United States. On January 11, the coldest air in 3 years came down on the Northeastern United States. The Interstate 95 corridor had wind chills dip below 0 °F (−18 °C), while it dipped in the -30s Fahrenheit in interior New York and Maine. On January 15, the cold wave returned and strengthened, giving New York City the coldest day of the year, with a high of only 21 °F (−6 °C) and a low of only 10 °F (−12 °C), making the low the coldest reading in Central Park since January 31st, 2019. This was after January 14 was slightly above average, with temperatures at 43 °F (6 °C). In Syracuse, New York, the high was only 6 °F (−14 °C). January 2022 was Syracuse's first time in ten months having a below average month, and like in New York City, the day before had a slightly above average high of 36 °F (2 °C). Burlington, Vermont had a wind chill as low as −32 °F (−36 °C) on January 15. January 15 saw temperatures as cold as −44.4 °C (−47.9 °F) in parts of Quebec and −40.6 °C (−41.1 °F) in parts of Ontario. Toronto recorded a low of −21.1 °C (−6.0 °F), Quebec City recorded a low of −28.0 °C (−18.4 °F), Montreal recorded a low of −25.7 °C (−14.3 °F), and Ottawa saw temperatures as low as −26.8 °C (−16.2 °F). A week later, Lopez, Pennsylvania recorded a low of −24 °F (−31 °C) on January 22. That day, Canaan Valley, West Virginia set an all-time record low of −31 °F (−35 °C). Quebec City tied an all-time record low of −36.7 °C (−34.1 °F) on January 22 as well. On that day, several record lows were set, including Houlton, ME, at −25 °F (−32 °C), and Massena, New York, at −29 °F (−34 °C). International Falls, MN had a frigid high on January 25, at just −7 °F (−22 °C). On January 21, four Canadians froze to death just 40 feet (12 m) from the border with Minnesota with wind chill temperatures of −29 °F (−34 °C). A fifth person died from a cold weather-related incident in New York, where the temperatures were −12 °F (−24 °C). On January 21, an incident happened in a lake in Queens, when two people fell in the frozen lake, whereas the FDNY attempted to rescue the people that were stuck in the lake while using cold water gear. In West Palm Beach, the city reached a low of 37 °F (3 °C), the coldest temperature recorded since 2010, and Vero Beach tied their 1978 record low temperature at 30 °F (−1 °C) on the morning of January 30. Syracuse saw 8 days below 0 °F (−18 °C), the most in 7 years. Parts of Cuba get as low as 3.0 °C (37.4 °F) early on January 31. January 2022 became the fifth coldest January in record at Covington, Virginia.

=== Mid-January winter storm ===
- Category 2 "Significant" (RSI/NOAA: 3.407)
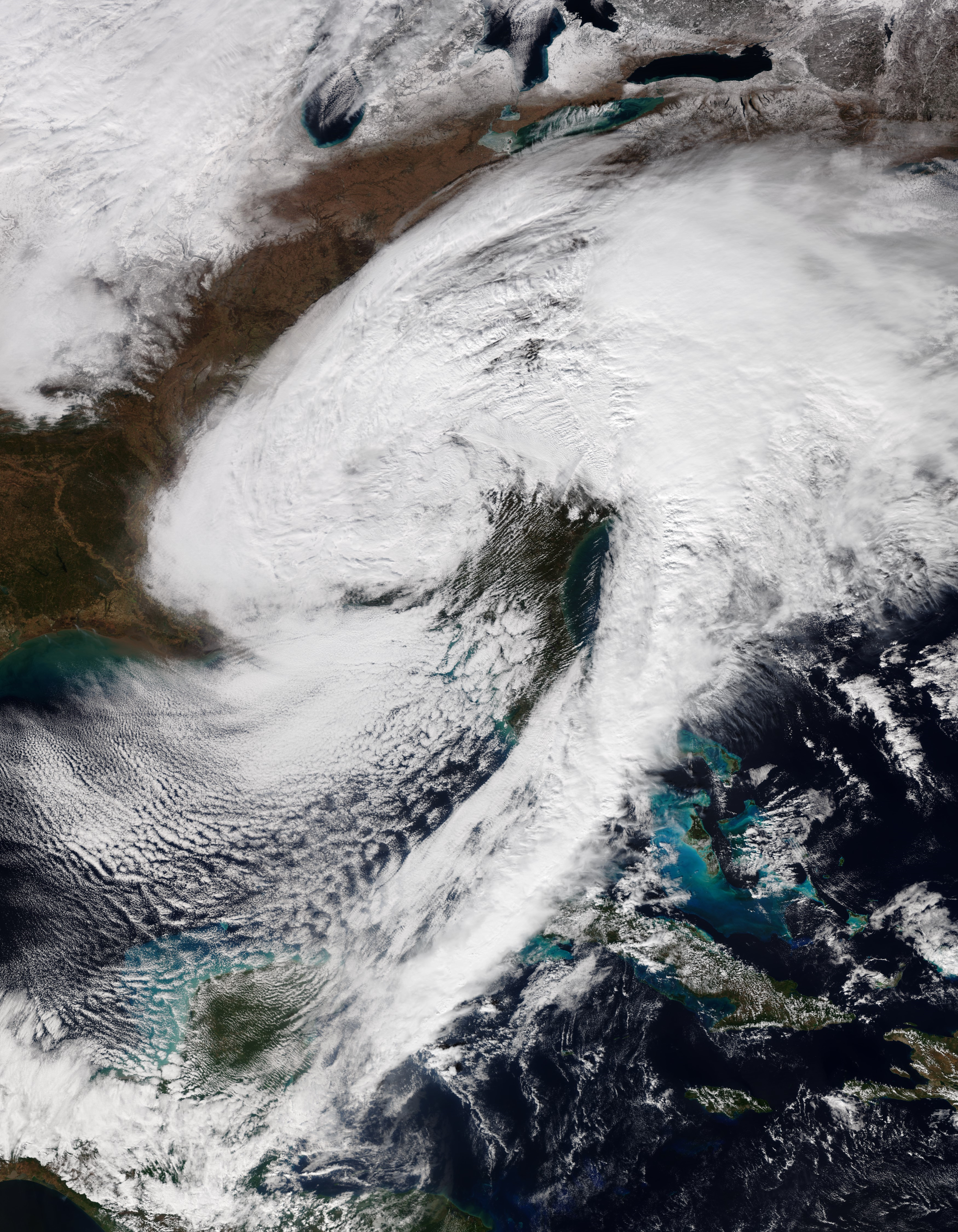
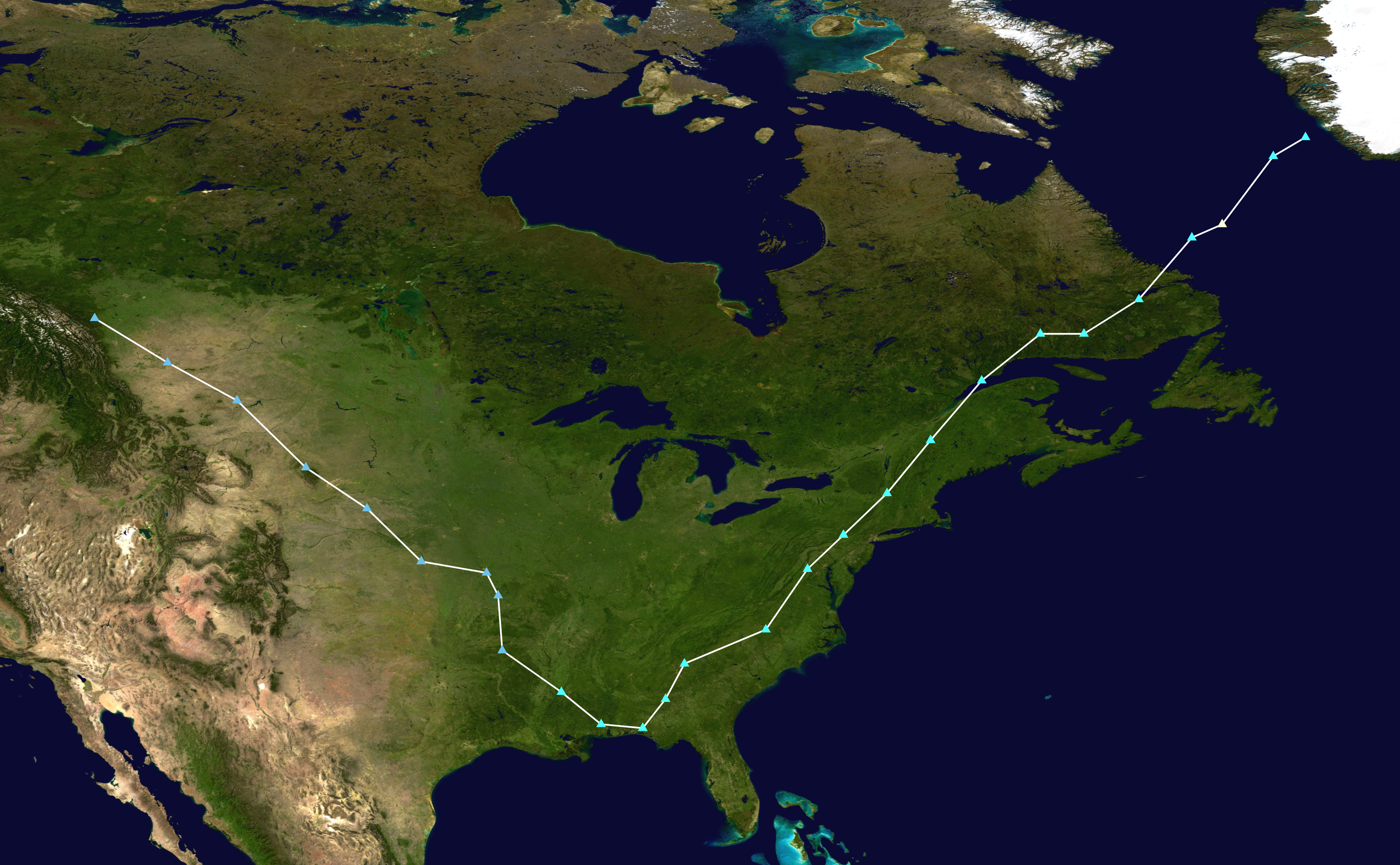
- Duration: January 13 – January 19, 2022
- Lowest pressure: 981 mb (28.97 inHg)
- Maximum snow: 27.5 in (70 cm)
- Fatalities: 5 fatalities
- Damage: $600 million (2022 USD)

A weak area of low pressure developed on January 13 in southwestern Canada, moving southeastwards into the High Plains while delivering heavy snowfall and began moving more southwards through the states of Nebraska, Kansas and Missouri into the early morning hours of January 14. Later that day, at 21:00 UTC the Weather Prediction Center (WPC) began issuing periodic storm summary bulletins on the developing system, albeit with competing areas of low pressure. Moving further south, a stronger low began forming over southern Missouri on January 15, moving into Arkansas and began strengthening due to a strong upper-level low located nearby. Associated cold air in place over the aforementioned areas allowed snow to break out in areas further south, as the system began occluding later that night while wintry precipitation spread eastward towards the Southeastern United States into the early morning hours of January 16. The system began turning more northward later that day into the southern Appalachian Mountains as the two centers began merging.

The storm, unofficially named Winter Storm Izzy by The Weather Channel, caused 11 inches (28 cm) of snow in Laurens, Iowa. There were also 78 car crashes reported, which caused 14 injures. Georgia, Virginia, North Carolina and South Carolina all declared a state of emergency in preparation for the winter storm.

=== Late January blizzard ===
- Category 1 "Notable" (RSI/NOAA: 2.295)
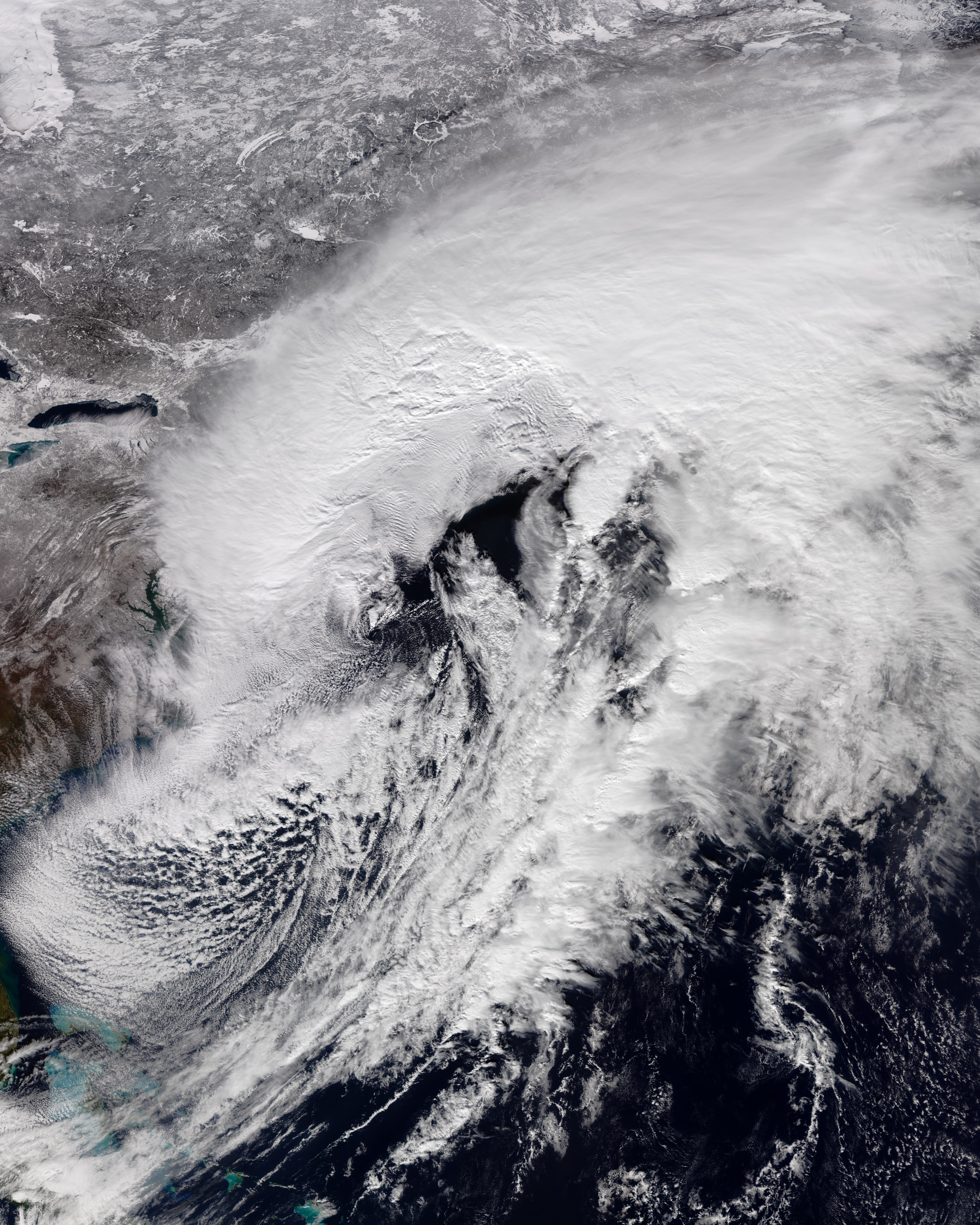
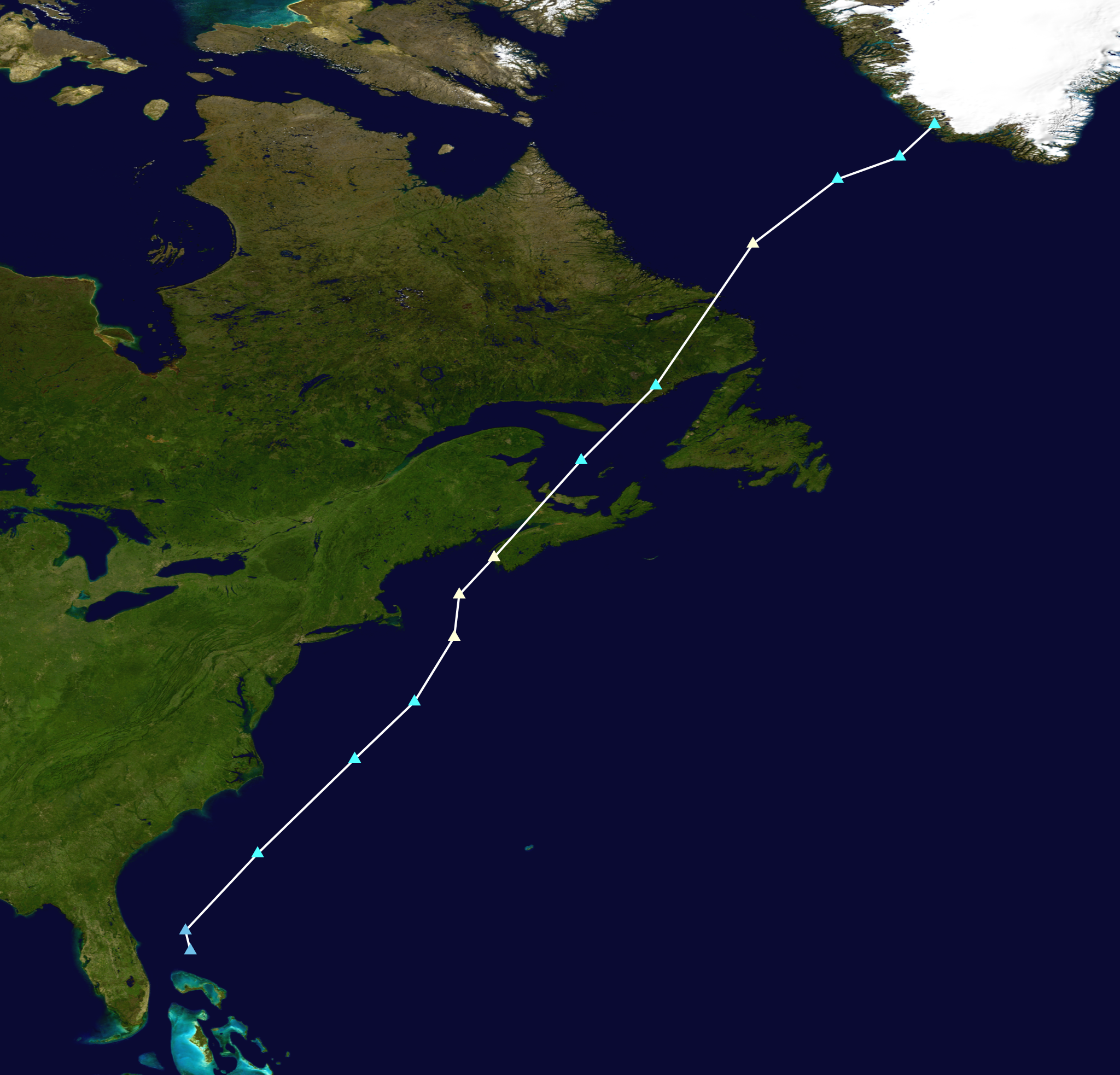
- Duration: January 27 – January 30, 2022
- Lowest pressure: 969 mb (28.61 inHg)
- Maximum snow: 35.7 in (91 cm)
- Fatalities: 4 fatalities
- Damage: $50 million (2022 USD)

A blizzard, unofficially named Winter Storm Kenan by The Weather Channel caused widespread and significant conditions on the East Coast of the United States from January 27–30.

Winter storm warnings and blizzard warnings were issued for large swaths of the Northeast and New England, as blizzard conditions were expected to occur closer to the coastal areas of the region. Approximately 1,200 flights nationwide were cancelled ahead of the storm. New York governor Kathy Hochul on January 28 urged residents, particularly those further east in the Long Island region, to prepare for high winds, power outages and near-blizzard conditions. People were also urged to not travel at the height of the storm. Hochul also ordered that state emergency assets be ready in case the system tracked further west. A "snow alert" was declared in New York City by the New York Department of Sanitation that day as well. On Long Island, Public Service Enterprise Group crews worked to cut tree branches in order to prevent power outages from snow weighing down on the branches and breaking. In New Jersey, major roadways such as Interstate 95 and Interstate 78 were being brined by the New Jersey Department of Transportation since January 26. The agency also stated that potential drivers should check their car settings and be prepared should the urgent need to travel arise. Officials in Atlantic City announced a parking ban would go into effect at 5 p.m. on January 28, in addition to opening shelters. In Boston, Massachusetts, officials warned of up to 30 inches (76 cm) of snow through early on January 30. Early on January 28, a Blizzard Warning was issued for Rhode Island and eastern Massachusetts. The state of Virginia declared a state of emergency on January 27 in preparation for the storm system.

Blizzard conditions were confirmed at multiple locations in New England, including Providence, Boston, and Worcester. Boston recorded its snowiest day in January on record, and also tied its all time one-day snowfall record with the North American blizzard of 2003, with 23.5 inches (600 mm) of snow falling. Providence broke its all time daily snowfall record set in 1961, with 18.8 inches (480 mm) of snow falling.

=== Early February winter storm ===
- Category 2 "Significant" (RSI/NOAA: 5.476)
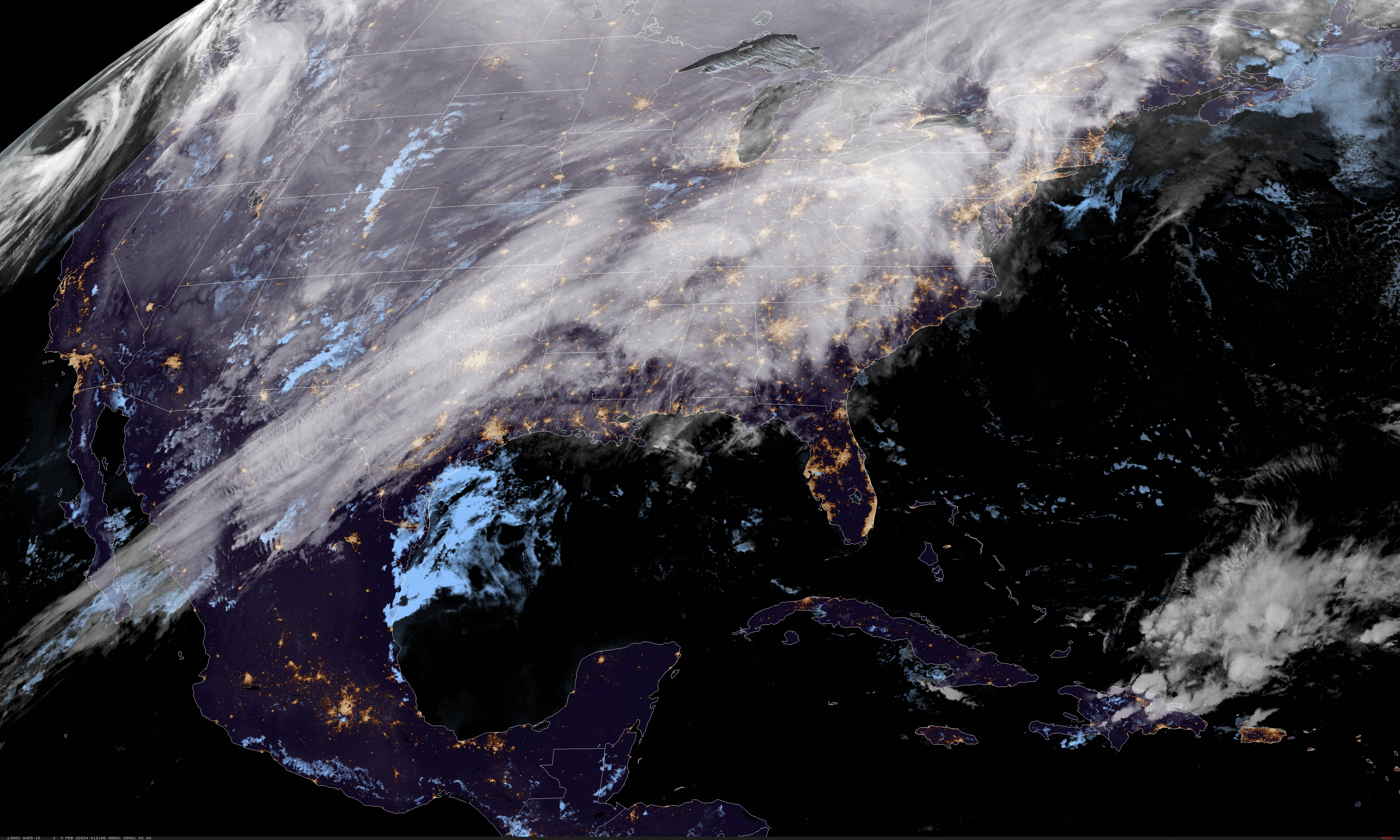
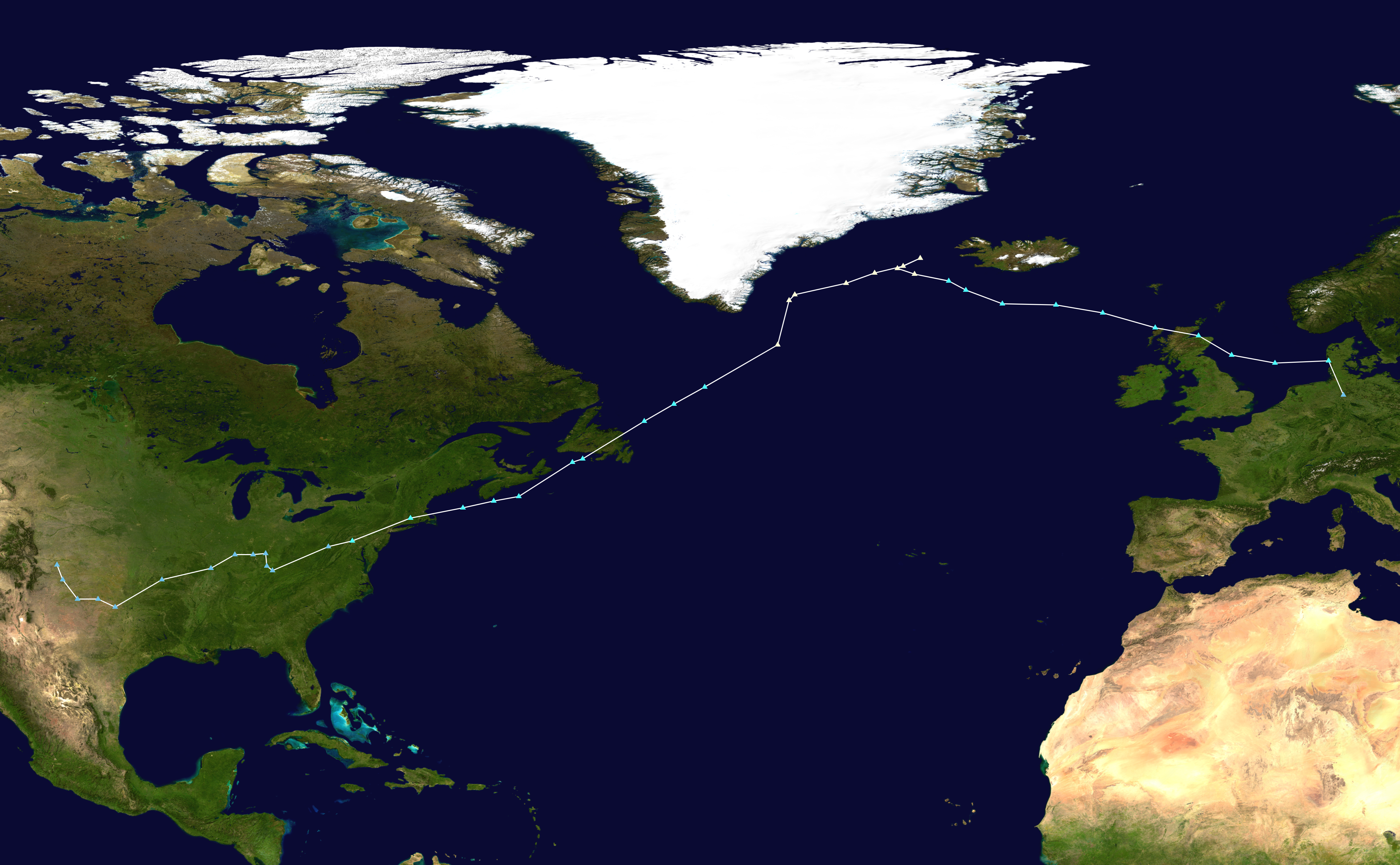
- Duration: February 1 – February 5, 2022
- Lowest pressure: 1004 mb (29.65 inHg)
- Maximum snow: 37.5 in (95 cm)
- Fatalities: 7 fatalities
- Damage: $350 million (2022 USD)

A widespread, damaging and severe winter storm affected a wide swath of most of the United States with widespread wintry precipitation, spreading from Texas all the way northeast to Maine in early February 2022. Nineteen states in the U.S. received impacts from the system, with more than 90 million people that were in the storm's path. The winter storm was unofficially named Winter Storm Landon by The Weather Channel and was also referred to by other media outlets as the Groundhog Snowstorm, primarily due to the storm impacting on Groundhog Day. The National Weather Service issued winter storm watches from Wyoming to Maine. Winter Storm Warnings were also issued from New Mexico to Maine, and at least 18 states were under winter storm warnings. In northeastern Ohio, and Buffalo, New York, snow amounts of more than a foot were forecasted. Amtrak cancelled or modified the routes several trains due to the storm.

Due to wintry conditions across Dallas, Texas, Dallas/Fort Worth International Airport was closed on February 3. 1 person was killed in Dallas, primarily when a semi-truck crashed while traveling on I-45 while traveling over I-30, an additional dog died in the crash as well. Three inches of snow were reported in Nashville, Tennessee, as well as 2 additional inches in Little Rock, Arkansas and Mayfield, Kentucky. Over 120,000 people lost power in Shelby County, Tennessee. On I-10 near Kerrville, Texas, several semi-trucks were jackknifed, causing drivers to be stranded on the interstate for hours. A truck driver died on I-35 in Oklahoma after losing control on an icy part of the road. A person in Oklahoma died after crashing in an ATV on a snow-covered road. Ice impacts reached as far south as Corpus Christi, Texas.

=== Late February winter storm ===
A very large winter storm affected 265 million people towards the end of February. Portions of Interstate 5 in California were closed as a result of the snow. Record breaking snow in Flagstaff, Arizona also forced a closure on Interstate 40. In Wichita Falls, Texas, temperatures fell from 77 °F (25 °C) on Monday to the teens by Wednesday, with sleet falling. Austin saw their largest 24 hour temperature drop on record, from 88 °F (31 °C) to 32 °F (0 °C), from Tuesday to Wednesday. A fatal car crash in Tennessee killed one person. There was also a child who died on a frozen bridge in Kentucky. There were also 52 injuries in Missouri due to a combined 402 car crashes. 33,000 customers in Arkansas, and 15,000 in Tennessee lost power. The Missouri car crashes caused 4 deaths. In the Northeast, temperatures fell from nearly 70 °F (21 °C) on Wednesday to the 30s Fahrenheit by Friday. In fact, Bangor, Maine even set a record February temperature on February 23, 2022, at 65 °F (18 °C), and Islip, New York tied their monthly record high of 68 °F (20 °C), although the monthly record in Islip would be broken on February 16, 2023. Bath, Pennsylvania saw 0.6 inches (1.5 cm) of freezing rain, while Mooers, New York had 12 inches (30 cm) of snow, Madison, New Hampshire had 11.5 inches (29 cm) of snow, and Boston had 8.5 inches (22 cm) of snow. A seventh fatality occurred in a 30 car pileup on Interstate 89 in Milton, Vermont.

=== Mid-March winter storm and cold wave ===
A winter storm developed on March 9 as a shortwave trough over the High Plains and Midwest before moving eastward and dropping moderate to heavy accumulations across the region from March 9–10. It was unofficially named Winter Storm Quinlan by the Weather Channel. On March 12, snow got over 10.0 inches (25 cm) in the interior and a dusting on the Interstate 95 corridor, and a 73 car pileup in Pennsylvania caused ten injuries. Over 143,000 customers lost power. Heavy snow in the Pittsburgh metropolitan area forced speed restrictions on Interstate 70 and Interstate 79. Rockwood, Maine saw the peak of 14 inches (36 cm). Snow even fell as far south as Louisiana and Mississippi, but quickly melted. High winds at High Point Monument reached 82 mph (132 km/h), faster than any gust during Hurricane Sandy at that location, while in Ocala, Florida, a tornado touched down, which was rated EF1. The strong winds also resulted in the upper level of the Verrazzano–Narrows Bridge being closed.

Following that an arctic cold wave from Canada went as far south as Texas and Georgia, causing record-breaking low temperatures for the month of March in many areas in the eastern half of the U.S. However, before moving east, the arctic air also caused Casper, Wyoming to set an all-time record low for the month of March, at −25 °F (−32 °C). Pittsburgh had a low of 9 °F (−13 °C) on March 13. Parts of Wisconsin reached −8 °F (−22 °C). Meanwhile, Jacksonville, Florida saw a record low of 30 °F (−1 °C). Wind chills dipped as low as 22 °F (−6 °C). The lowest temperature in Tennessee during the event is −4 °F (−20 °C).

=== Mid-April blizzard ===
- Category 0 "Nuisance" (RSI/NOAA: N/A)
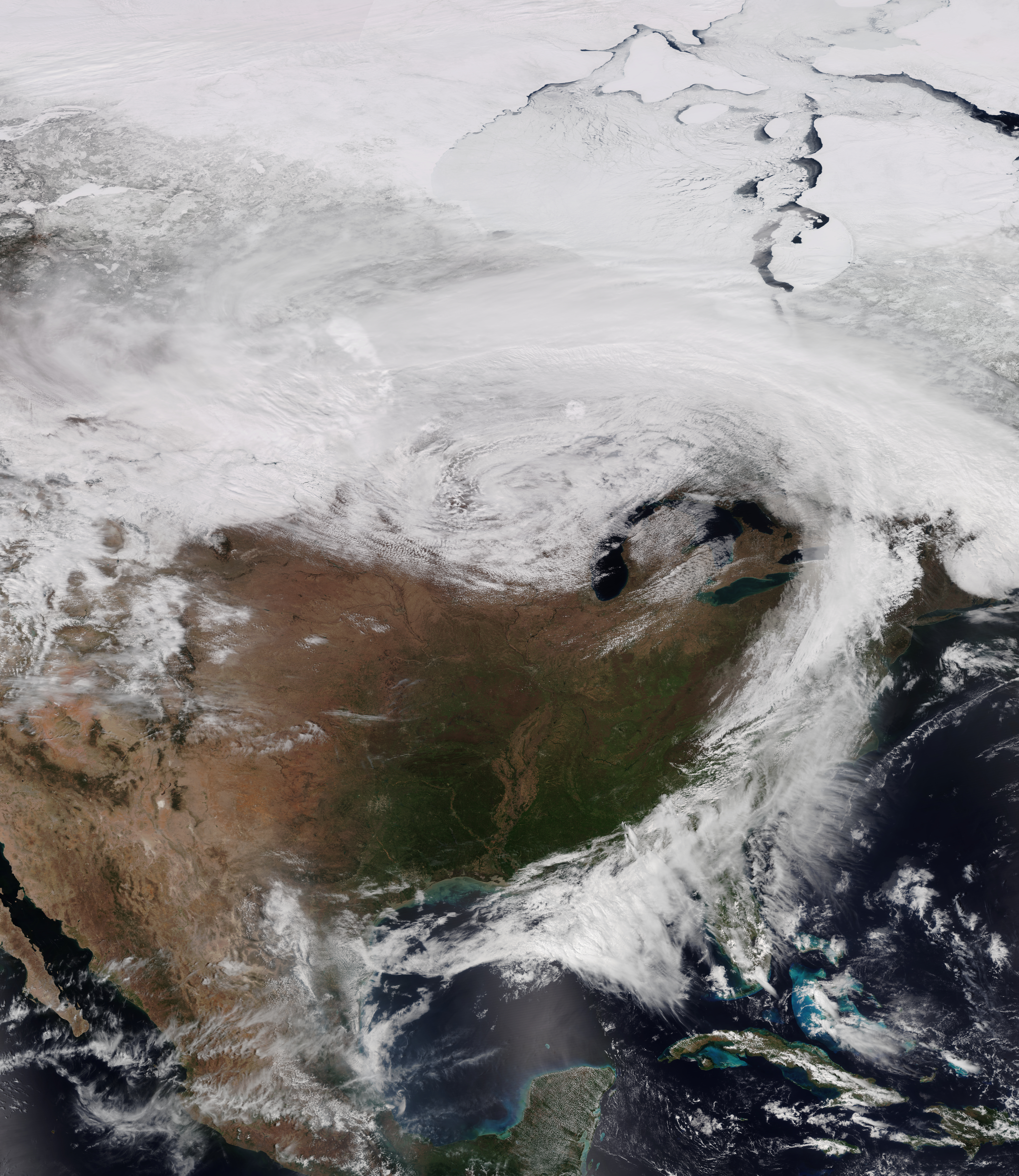
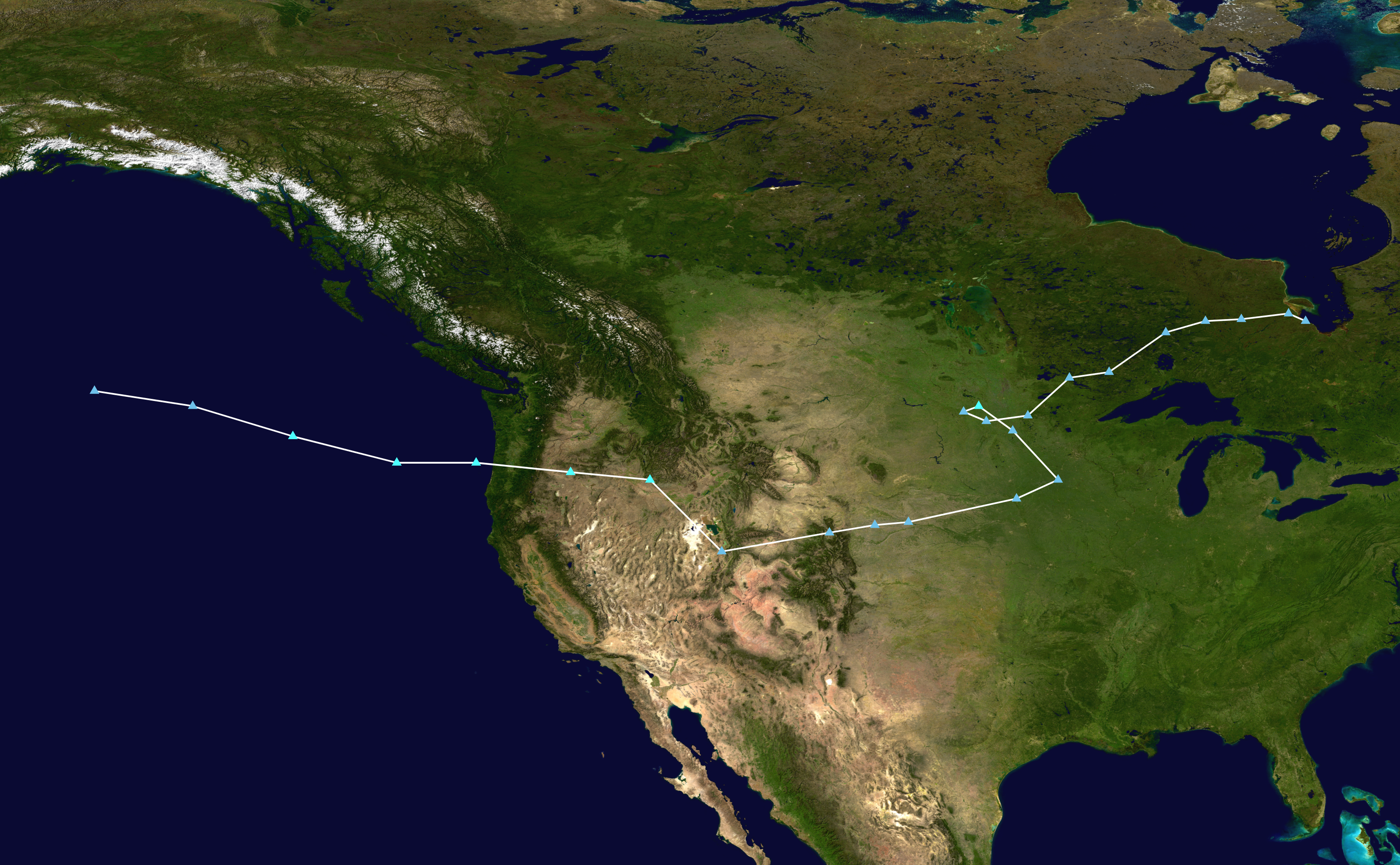
- Duration: April 11 – April 14, 2022
- Lowest pressure: 982 mb (29.00 inHg)
- Maximum snow: 47 in (120 cm)
- Fatalities: 1 fatalities

In mid-April, a powerful late-season blizzard, unofficially named Winter Storm Silas by The Weather Channel, hammered the southern areas of Canada and North Dakota, dropping as much as 40 inches (100 cm) of snow in some areas.

On April 12, 2022, the National Hockey League announced that the upcoming Winnipeg Jets game against the Seattle Kraken, which was originally scheduled for April 13, has been postponed to May 1 as a winter storm swept through the southern area of Manitoba. On April 13, a video is released of cattle in Douglas huddling together in the storm to protect their calves. A low temperature record of Denver, Colorado was set due to this storm, at 11 °F (−12 °C), on April 13. Several locations in Montana also had record low conditions across April 12 and 13. In Elko, Nevada, a record low daily temperature of 7 °F (−14 °C) was set. Also, in Elko, a daily maximum amount of 0.8 inches (2.0 cm) was set. The storm caused Billings, Montana recorded their snowiest April day since 1955. Pony, Montana saw 47 inches (120 cm) of snow. The blizzard caused Interstate 94 to be shut down between Jamestown, North Dakota and Glendive, Montana, US Route 83 to be closed from Bismarck, North Dakota to Minot, North Dakota, and US Route 85 to be closed from the South Dakota border to Amidon, North Dakota. There was one fatality due to the blizzard in North Dakota.

=== Mid-April nor'easter ===
- Category 0 "Nuisance" (RSI/NOAA: N/A)
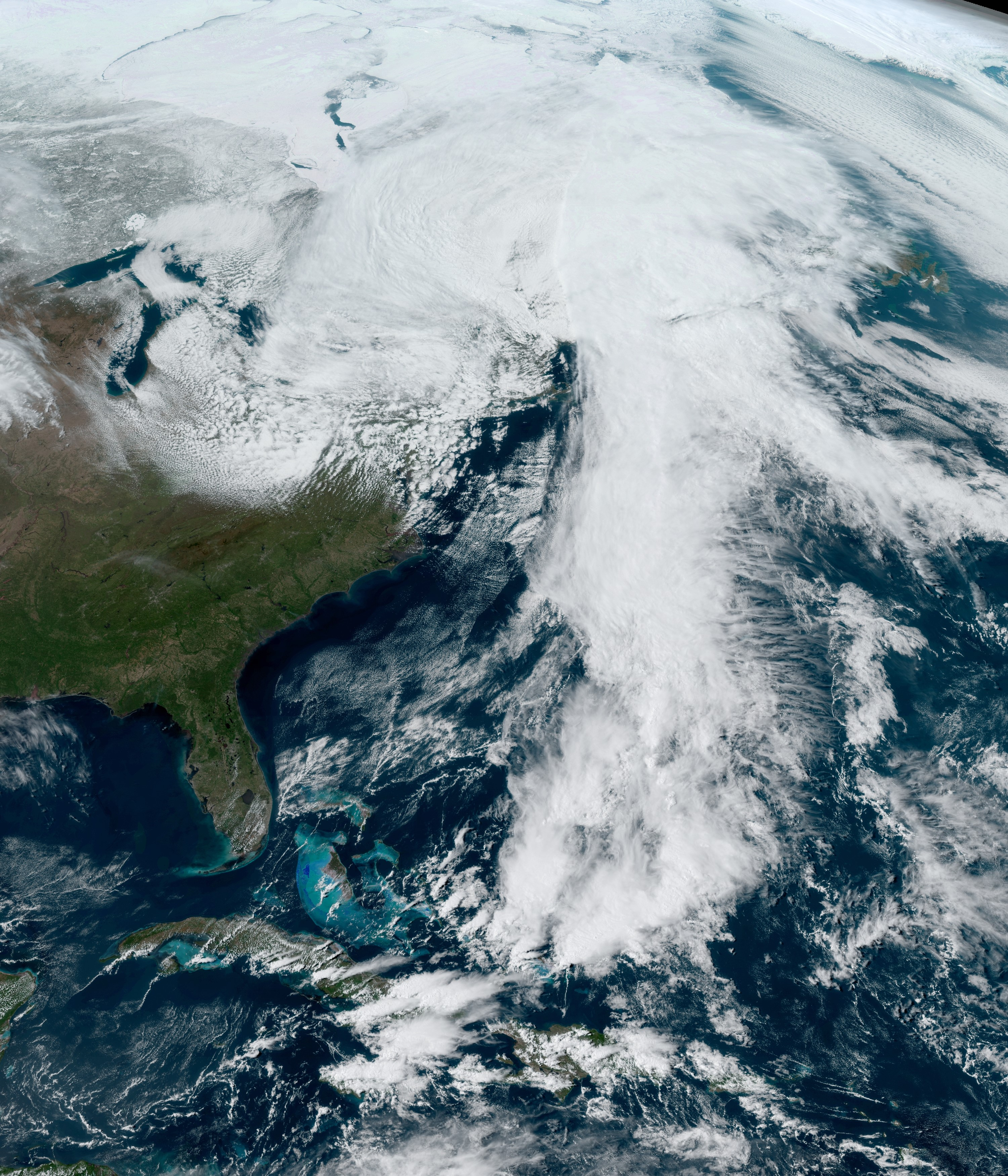
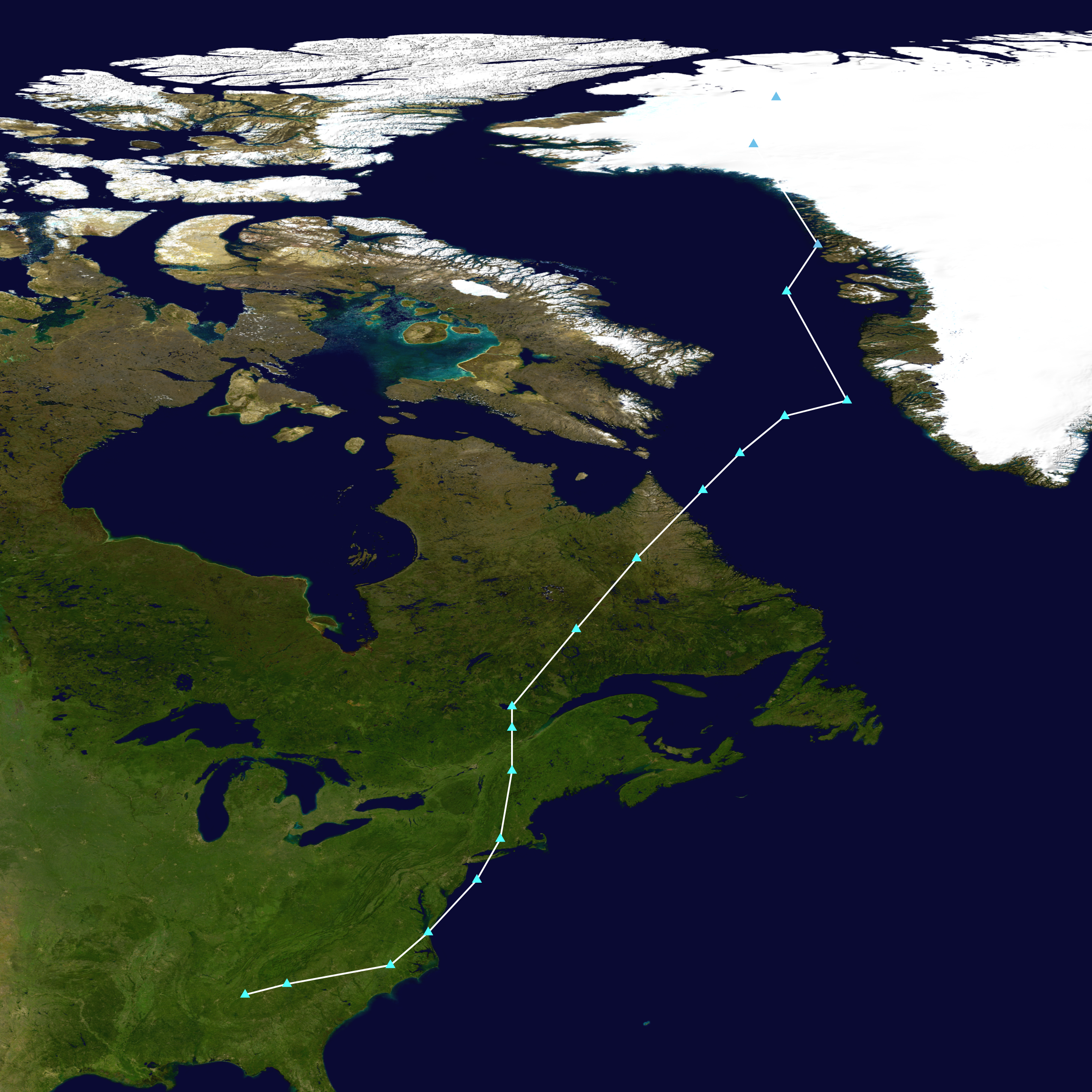
- Duration: April 18 – April 20, 2022
- Lowest pressure: 990 mb (29.23 inHg)
- Maximum snow: 18 in (46 cm)
- Fatalities: 1 fatalities
- Damage: $25 million (2022 USD)

Beginning early on April 18, a nor'easter began developing off the Southeastern United States, bringing heavy rain, wind and coastal flooding to much of the Mid-Atlantic states. Further inland in areas like Pennsylvania, upper New York and Vermont, heavy snowfall fell of up to 6–12 inches (15–30 cm). In Annapolis, Maryland, a tree fell on a home, killing a person and injuring three others. Between 3am and 9am, heavy rain on the Major Deegan Expressway caused all the southbound lanes to shut down. Over 300,000 customers in the Northeast lost power, including 200,000 in New York. Virgil, New York saw 18 inches (46 cm) of snow, while Montrose, Pennsylvania saw 14.5 inches (37 cm) of snow. Binghamton, which saw 14.2 inches (36 cm), realized its largest April snowstorm on record. From 12:30am to 4am on April 19, the NWS office in Boston lost power. Meanwhile, farther south, heavy rain falls, with 2.09 inches (53 mm) in Central Park, 1.55 inches (39 mm) at JFK International Airport, and 1.8 inches (46 mm) in Newark. Wind gusts along the South Shore of Long Island were over 50 miles per hour (80 km/h). Two MLB games were postponed due to rain: at Citi Field between the New York Mets and San Francisco Giants, and at Nationals Park between the Washington Nationals and Arizona Diamondbacks. Meanwhile, another game between the Cleveland Guardians and Chicago White Sox was postponed due to snow. According to Aon Benfield, damage was $25 million.

=== Late May winter storm ===
A very late-season winter storm, unofficially named Winter Storm Tad by The Weather Channel, affected the state of Colorado on May 20–21, 2022. A shortwave trough moved through the area, dumping up to 24 inches (61 cm) of snow in the state. Some areas even received their heaviest snowfall for the month of May as a result, although Denver did not see a record-breaking amount. The winter storm followed on the heels of a large temperature drop throughout the state, following temperatures of near 90 °F (32 °C) the day before, with some areas like Denver seeing a 50 °F (28 °C) drop in that timeframe. In Denver, as the front came through, the temperature dropped from 85 °F (29 °C), to 59 °F (15 °C), in 23 minutes. The highest accumulations in Colorado were 11.4 inches (29 cm), while it was 11 inches (28 cm) in Montana. The winter storm caused 100,000 customers to lose power. In addition, over 600 flights were delayed and over 300 more were cancelled. The low on May 21 in Denver was a record tying 31 °F (−1 °C). While Wyoming did not see as much snow, several locations saw record low temperatures on May 21, and with a low of 26 °F (−3 °C) on May 22, Cheyenne also set a record low that day, although Cheyenne missed a record low on May 21. The second half of May was the coldest since 1951 in the area. An MLB game between the New York Mets and the Colorado Rockies was postponed due to the intolerable conditions.

== Records ==
=== United States ===
A rare springtime cold wave affected the Northeastern United States at the end of March, following an arctic front moving in the night of March 27 into the morning of March 28. The high in New York City of 33 °F (1 °C) on March 28 is a record low high temperature, which was the coldest high temperature for Central Park this late in the year since April 7, 1982, when the high reached only 30 °F (−1 °C). This is also lower than the typical high temperature in January, which is 39 °F (4 °C) January. LaGuardia Airport, as well as Bridgeport, Connecticut, saw high temperatures as low as 32 °F (0 °C). Philadelphia got close to breaking a record cold high temperature, with a high of 36 °F (2 °C) on March 28. The lows dipped down into the 20s for 3 nights, and winds gusted as high as 30 miles per hour (48 km/h). In Stroudsburg, Pennsylvania, the high of 28 °F (−2 °C) was the coldest high temperature so late in the season. In Massachusetts, Boston tied a record cold high temperature of only 33 °F (1 °C), and in Worcester, the high only reached 27 °F (−3 °C), one degree below the previous record. Wind chills in Worcester got as low as −1 °F (−18 °C) on the morning of March 28. The humidity was very low, with a dew point of 0 °F (−18 °C) in Lehigh Valley.

The cold lingered into March 29, when Boston had a high of only 37 °F (3 °C). Some parts of the New York Metropolitan Area tie record lows that morning, and JFK International Airport set a new record low of 24 °F (−4 °C). Record lows stretched as far west as Youngstown, Ohio where a record low of 14 °F (−10 °C) occurred.

=== Canada ===
Hamilton, Ontario had its coldest high on March 28 since 1923, with a high of only −4.7 °C (23.5 °F).

== Season effects ==
This is a table of all of the events that have occurred in the 2021–22 North American winter. It includes their duration, damage, impacted locations, and death totals. Deaths in parentheses are additional and indirect (an example of an indirect death would be a traffic accident), but were still related to that storm. All of the damage figures are in 2022 USD.

Regional snowfall index scale
C0	C1	C2	C3	C4	C5

2021–22 North American winter season statistics
Event name	Dates active	RSI category	RSI value	Highest gust mph (km/h)	Minimum pressure (mbar)	Maximum snow in (cm)	Maximum ice in (mm)	Areas affected	Damage (2022 USD)	Deaths
October 2021 Northeast Pacific bomb cyclone	October 24 – 26	N/A	N/A	159 (256)	942	42 (110)	N/A	Alaska, Western United States, Western Canada	>$400 million	2
Pre-Halloween nor'easter	October 25 – 28	N/A	N/A	113 (182)	983	N/A	N/A	Southern United States, East Coast of the United States, Canada	$200 million	2
December tornado outbreak and winter storm	December 9 – 12	N/A	N/A	Unknown	974	36 (91)	N/A	Western United States, Central United States, Midwestern United States, Eastern United States, Eastern Canada	Unknown	None
January 3-4 nor'easter	January 3-4	Category 1	2.325	N/A	N/A	15.5 (39)	N/A	Mid-Atlantic United States	$495 million	5
January 4-7 nor'easter	January 4-7	Category 1	1.466	N/A	968	17.7 (45)	N/A	Tennessee, Kentucky, Northeastern United States	Unknown	1
Mid-January winter storm	January 13 – 17	Category 2	3.407	91 (146)	981	27.5 (70)	0.50 (12.7)	South-central Canada, Northwestern United States, High Plains, Central, Southeastern United States, Northeastern United States	$600 million	5
Late January blizzard	January 27 – 30	Category 1	2.295	99 (159)	969	35.7 (91)	N/A	Southeastern United States, Northeastern United States, Atlantic Canada	$50 million	4
Early February winter storm	February 1 – 5	Category 2	5.476	Unknown	1004	37 (94)	0.80 (20)	Central United States, Eastern United States, northern Mexico, Atlantic Canada	$250 million	7
Late February winter storm	February 22 – 26	N/A	N/A	Unknown	Unknown	12 (30)	Unknown	Southwestern United States, Southeastern United States, Midwestern United States, Northeastern United States	Unknown	6
Mid-March winter storm	March 9 – 13	N/A	N/A	Unknown	Unknown	20 (51)	N/A	Western United States, Central United States, Eastern United States, Atlantic Canada	Unknown	0
Mid-April blizzard	April 11 – 14	N/A	N/A	Unknown	982	47 (120)	N/A	Western United States, Atlantic Canada	Unknown	1
April 2022 nor'easter	April 18 – 19	N/A	N/A	N/A	990	18 (46)	N/A	Northeastern United States	$25 million	1
Late May winter storm	May 20 – 21	N/A	N/A	Unknown	Unknown	24 (61)	N/A	Western United States	Unknown	Unknown
Season aggregates
4 RSI storms	October 24 – May 21				942	60 (150)	0.80 (20)		≥ $1.97 billion	26 (10)

== See also ==
- List of major snow and ice events in the United States
- Winter storm
- 2021–22 European windstorm season
- Tornadoes of 2021
- Weather of 2021
- Weather of 2022

Preceded by 2020–21	North American winters 2021–22	Succeeded by 2022–23
