= February 2016 North American winter storm =

Climate phenomenon in North America

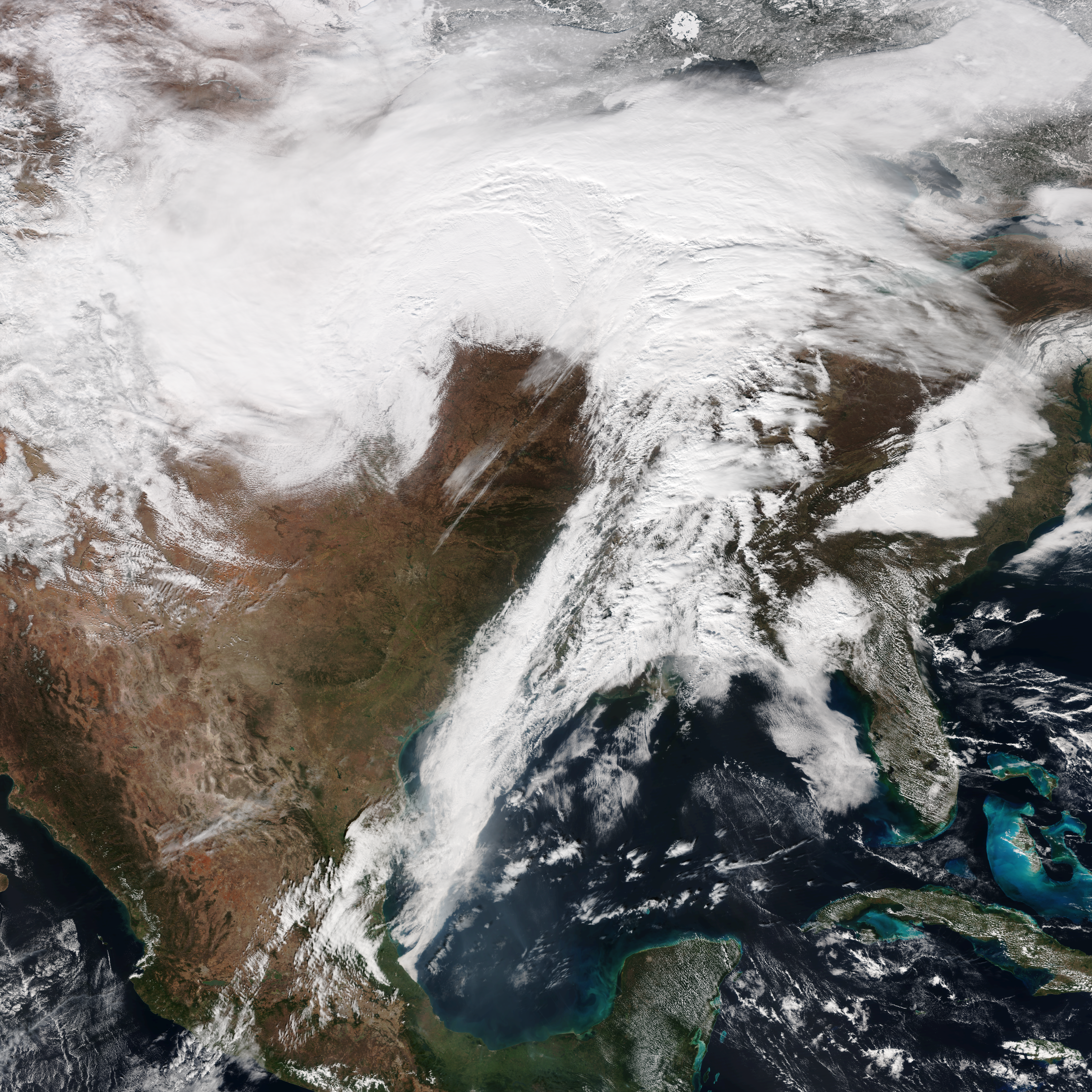
- The extratropical cyclone responsible for the winter storm at 16:00 UTC (11:00 a.m EDT) on February 2, 2016 over the Upper Midwest

Meteorological history
- Formed: January 29, 2016
- Dissipated: February 7, 2016 (moved out to sea)

Category 2 "Minor" winter storm
- Regional snowfall index: 4.68 (NOAA)
- Max. snowfall: 41 in (100 cm) in Coal Bank Pass, Colorado

Tornado outbreak
- Tornadoes: 14
- Max. rating: EF2 tornado
- Duration: 1 day, 1 hour, 23 minutes

Overall effects
- Fatalities: 7
- Damage: $7.472 million (Tornadoes only)
- Areas affected: Western United States, Central United States, Southeastern United States, Northeastern United States
- Power outages: 100,000
- Part of the 2015–16 North American winter and Tornadoes of 2016

The February 2016 North American winter storm was a strong winter storm that caused more than 70,000 people in southern California to lose their electricity, with many broken trees and electrical lines in that area, with the Southern Rocky Mountains having the potential to receive some of the greatest snowfall from the system. One person in San Diego, California area died when a tree fell on their car. Another person in Minnesota died after being struck by a car while crossing a street.

== Meteorological history ==
Map plotting the storm's track and intensity, according to the Saffir–Simpson scale Map key Saffir–Simpson scale Tropical depression (≤38 mph, ≤62 km/h) Tropical storm (39–73 mph, 63–118 km/h) Category 1 (74–95 mph, 119–153 km/h) Category 2 (96–110 mph, 154–177 km/h) Category 3 (111–129 mph, 178–208 km/h) Category 4 (130–156 mph, 209–251 km/h) Category 5 (≥157 mph, ≥252 km/h) Unknown Storm type Tropical cyclone Subtropical cyclone Extratropical cyclone, remnant low, tropical disturbance, or monsoon depression

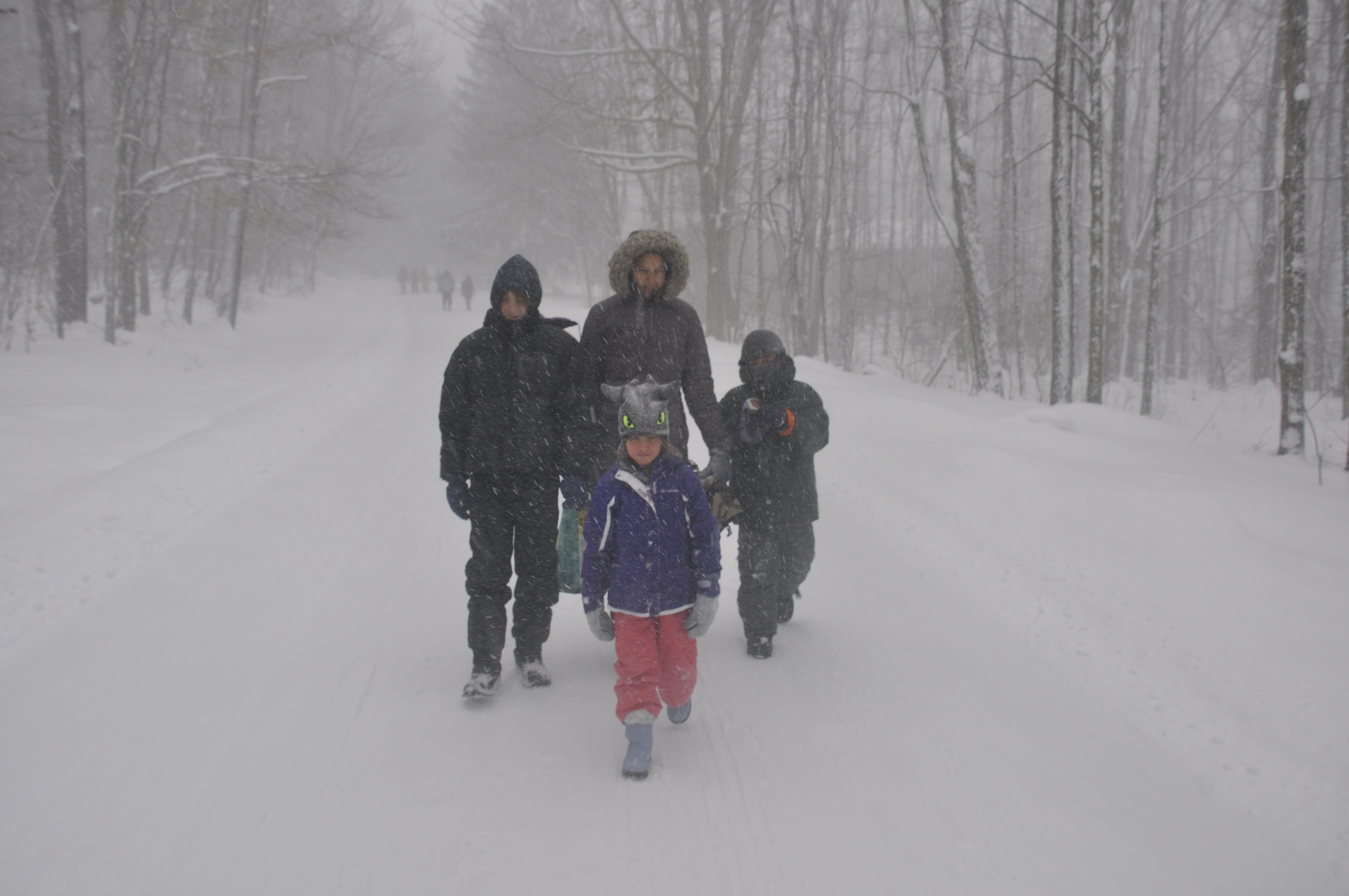
Blizzard in Pennsylvania.

The storm first developed late on January 29 near California and started to track east and brought heavy snow and wind to parts of the Southwest. Late on February 1, the storm started to track northeastward towards Canada, bringing with it blizzard conditions and up to 18 inches (0.46 m) of snow in parts of the Midwest. It also brought severe weather to parts of the South on February 2. As the system tracked northeast into Canada, it brought rain to most of the Mid-Atlantic, Northeast, and New England, which had already been hit by a previous historic storm about a week prior to this. After the storm complex had moved into Canada, the cold front associated with it stalled over the East Coast late on February 4. A new low pressure developed off North Carolina that night and started to track up the coast. It impacted areas already hit hard by the previous blizzard about two weeks prior, and caused messy travel along Interstate 95 in the Mid-Atlantic and Northeast areas. The storm brought a quick but moderate-to-heavy burst of fresh snow, with some areas in New England receiving up to 1 ft (0.30 m) of the wintry precipitation.

== Impact ==
Wolf Creek Pass got more than 23 in (58 cm) of snow in 24 hours as of the morning of February 1, with multiple feet of snow expected in the mountains of Utah and Colorado.

On February 1, over 500 airplane flights were canceled at Denver Airport.

A blizzard watch was issued for February 2 north and west of Des Moines.

Along with the aforementioned deaths, on February 5 two people were killed in Canton, Massachusetts when hit by heavy tree branches covered in heavy snow. In New York City, a person was killed when a huge construction crane, in the midst of being moved and secured due to the weather, collapsed and fell on him. While only 2.5 in (6.4 cm) of snow fell in Central Park, amounts totaled much higher in parts of the metro area, including as high as 13 in (33 cm) in Woodbridge, Connecticut. In Broomall, Pennsylvania, a 90-foot beech tree fell down on a house, killing an elderly couple.

=== Severe weather in the South ===
The storm also produced severe weather across the South on the evening of February 2, including 11 tornadoes, some of which were strong and caused considerable damage in and around Alabama and Mississippi towns of Collinsville, Scooba, and McMullen. More storms had affected the southeast region on February 3. Flooding also impacted the south including Georgia. On the 3rd, an EF0 tornado occurred near Columbia, South Carolina, and an EF1 tornado caused damage in Fort Stewart, Georgia. The tornadoes resulted in no fatalities, although two people were injured. A tornado emergency was issued during the storm for Carrollton, Alabama.

== Confirmed tornadoes ==
Confirmed tornadoes by Enhanced Fujita rating
EFU	EF0	EF1	EF2	EF3	EF4	EF5	Total
0	3	8	3	0	0	0	14

=== February 2 event ===
List of confirmed tornadoes – Tuesday, February 2, 2016 (Note: All dates are based on the local time zone where the tornado touched down; however, all times are in Coordinated Universal Time for consistency.)
EF#	Location	County / Parish	State	Start Coord.	Time (UTC)	Path length	Max width	Damage (2016 USD)
EF1	S of Newton to WSW of Hickory	Newton	MS	32.2441°N 89.1570°W	2048–2052	7.13 mi (11.47 km)	150 yd (140 m)	$120,000
EF1	Three site-built homes and a mobile home were damaged, two chicken houses were destroyed, and numerous trees and power poles were snapped along the path.							
EF2	SW of Collinsville to S of De Kalb	Lauderdale, Kemper	MS	32.4685°N 88.8749°W	2119–2149	21.23 mi (34.17 km)	880 yd (800 m)	$1,485,000
EF2	A strong wedge tornado damaged numerous homes and other structures in subdivisions in and around Collinsville, heavily damaged or destroyed a couple mobile homes, and caused extensive damage to buildings at Collinsville Baptist Church. Moving to the northeast, the tornado downed many trees, damaged outbuildings, and caused minor roof and fencing damage at West Lauderdale High School before dissipating in Kemper County.							
EF2	ESE of De Kalb to W of Panola, AL	Kemper, Noxubee	MS	32.7303°N 88.5776°W	2153–2223	18.52 mi (29.81 km)	300 yd (270 m)	$270,000
EF2	A multiple-vortex tornado impacted the west side of Scooba, downing many trees and power lines and damaging the baseball field, fence, and field-house buildings at East Mississippi Community College, as well as two mobile buildings and the roofs of several homes in the area. Moving away from Scooba, the tornado mowed down groves of trees, completely destroyed a well-constructed barn, a carport, and a metal shed, caused minor roof damage to another home, and damaged several other sheds. More trees were downed as the tornado dissipated near the Noxubee River.							
EF2	NNW of Panola to SW of Reform	Pickens	AL	33.0273°N 88.3177°W	2234–2309	26.2 mi (42.2 km)	1,200 yd (1,100 m)	$0
EF2	A strong wedge tornado was caught on camera by local media moved north-northeastward through Pickens County, causing minor damage to a building at a campground in Cochrane and to another building at the Aliceville federal prison. Multiple mobile homes and frame homes were heavily damaged or destroyed in the Sapp community northwest of Aliceville and McMullen, and trees blown over onto homes and other structures on the west side of Carrollton. Thousands of trees were snapped and uprooted along the path, and one person was injured.							
EF1	W of Alamo	Crockett	TN	35.7673°N 89.1677°W	2255–2303	2.64 mi (4.25 km)	100 yd (91 m)	$150,000
EF1	A mobile home, a site-built structure, several houses, and several buildings at Crockett County High School sustained roof damage as a result of this rain-wrapped tornado. Numerous sheds were damaged and many trees were downed, especially at the Crockett County Golf Club. Two tractor-trailers were overturned on US 412. The driver of one of the overturned trucks was injured.							
EF1	Shuqualak to SE of Macon	Noxubee	MS	32.9828°N 88.5732°W	2327–2336	6.59 mi (10.61 km)	150 yd (140 m)	$170,000
EF1	A large portion of the roof was removed from a gas station in Shuqualak, a 60-foot (18 m) section of the roof was taken off and windows were blown out of an old school building, and many trees were downed.							
EF1	SE of Kennedy	Fayette	AL	33.5399°N 87.9153°W	2336–2345	6.12 mi (9.85 km)	500 yd (460 m)	$0
EF1	A house sustained minor roof and porch damage, and numerous trees were downed.							
EF1	SW of Neshoba	Neshoba	MS	32.6071°N 89.1547°W	0039–0041	0.68 mi (1.09 km)	50 yd (46 m)	$22,000
EF1	A house had its tin roof torn off, an outbuilding was destroyed, and several trees were snapped or uprooted.							
EF1	SE of Beaverton	Lamar	AL	33.8779°N 88.0210°W	0210–0216	4.13 mi (6.65 km)	400 yd (370 m)	$0
EF1	One home sustained major roof damage, another sustained minor roof damage, and many trees were downed.							

=== February 3 event ===
List of confirmed tornadoes – Wednesday, February 3, 2016
EF#	Location	County / Parish	State	Start Coord.	Time (UTC)	Path length	Max width	Damage (2016 USD)
EF0	E of Ethelsville	Pickens	AL	33.3956°N 88.1635°W	0502–0508	4.18 mi (6.73 km)	1,400 yd (1,300 m)	$0
EF0	A weak wedge tornado downed several trees.							
EF0	SW of Lexington	Davidson	NC	35.7989°N 80.3185°W	1802–1804	1.03 mi (1.66 km)	50 yd (46 m)	$25,000
EF0	Numerous trees were snapped or uprooted, some of which fell onto and damaged homes and vehicles. Other homes sustained damage to shingles, gutters, and siding.							
EF1	NE of Lexington	Davidson	NC	35.8451°N 80.1522°W	1814–1816	1.67 mi (2.69 km)	100 yd (91 m)	$100,000
EF1	Numerous trees were snapped or uprooted, some of which fell onto and damaged homes and vehicles. Other homes sustained damage to shingles, gutters, and siding. Six to eight farm outbuildings were severely damaged or destroyed, including a few that had collapsed walls and major loss of roof panels.							
EF0	ESE of Pine Ridge	Lexington	SC	33.9033°N 81.0696°W	1928–1929	0.69 mi (1.11 km)	75 yd (69 m)	$50,000
EF0	A brief tornado either damaged or destroyed several cars in a storage lot and downed a few trees.							
EF1	Fort Stewart	Liberty	GA	31.8717°N 81.6247°W	2200–2212	5.7 mi (9.2 km)	300 yd (270 m)	$5,080,000
EF1	A high-end EF1 tornado touched down near Gate 7 on Fort Stewart and moved slowly northeast, causing heavy damage to six to ten homes in one neighborhood, mainly as a result of falling pine trees. However, one home had approximately 75 percent of its poorly-attached roof removed by the tornado itself. Three cars were moved/rolled-over in the parking lot at Diamond Elementary School, and one corner of the gymnasium sustained roof damage. Many trees and several power lines were downed along the path, which totaled damage to approximately 42 homes, 150 to 200 vehicles, and 8 storage unit facilities.							

== See also ==
- January 2016 United States blizzard
- Early January 2017 North American winter storm
- Mid-January 2017 North American ice storm
- February 9–11, 2017 North American blizzard
- February 12–14, 2017 North American blizzard
