= February 2017 North American blizzard =

The name February 2017 North American blizzard may refer to any of two blizzards that impacted North America in February 2017.

- February 9–11, 2017 North American blizzard – a powerful, fast-moving blizzard and nor'easter that impacted the Northeastern United States with snow and high winds
- February 12–14, 2017 North American blizzard – a slow-moving and intense blizzard that impacted much of New England with feet of snow
