= February 6–8, 2021 nor'easter =

Storm which affected the US

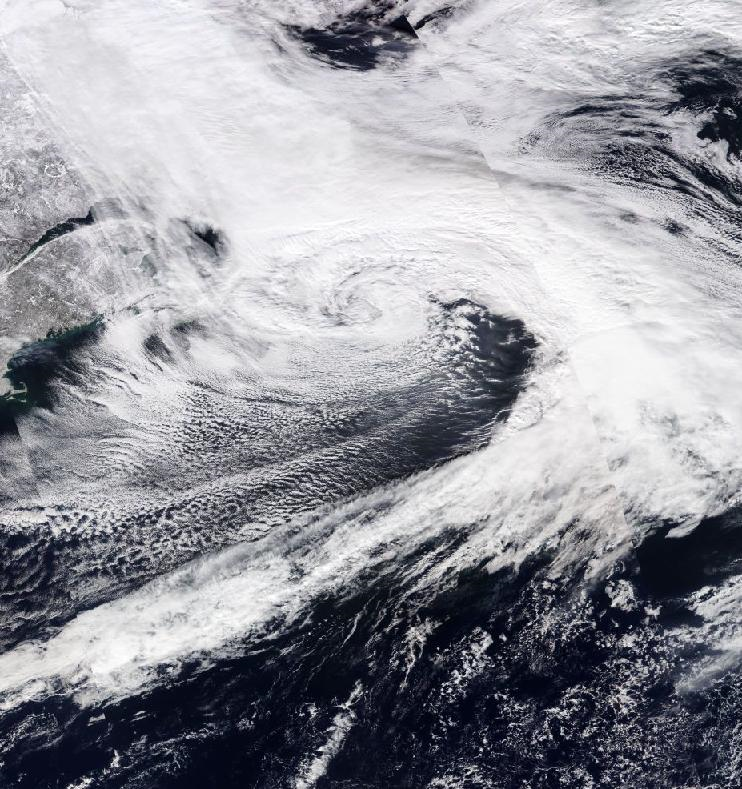
- Satellite imagery from GOES-16 of the nor'easter at peak intensity on February 8 near Nova Scotia

Meteorological history
- Formed: February 6, 2021
- Exited land: February 8, 2021
- Dissipated: February 16, 2021

Nor'easter
- Highest winds: 130 km/h (80 mph) (1-minute sustained winds)
- Lowest pressure: 960 hPa (mbar); 28.35 inHg
- Maximum snowfall or ice accretion: Snow – 20 in (50 cm) in Halifax, Nova Scotia

Overall effects
- Fatalities: 1 indirect
- Damage: Unknown
- Areas affected: Southern United States, Mid-Atlantic states, Northeastern United States, Bermuda, Atlantic Canada, Southern Greenland, Iceland
- Power outages: > 16,000
- Part of the 2020–21 North American winter

From February 6–8, 2021, a strong and fast-moving nor'easter, sometimes known as the 2021 Super Bowl Sunday nor'easter, and unofficially named Winter Storm Quade by The Weather Channel, impacted the Mid-Atlantic and New England states on Super Bowl Sunday, just days after another significant nor'easter impacted the same general regions. Developing on February 6 along a stationary front in the Southern United States and moving northeastward, the imminent impacts from the nor'easter forced several vaccination sites in the Northeast to temporarily close again for the following days. The storm caused one indirect death, and damage estimates are currently undetermined.

== Meteorological history ==
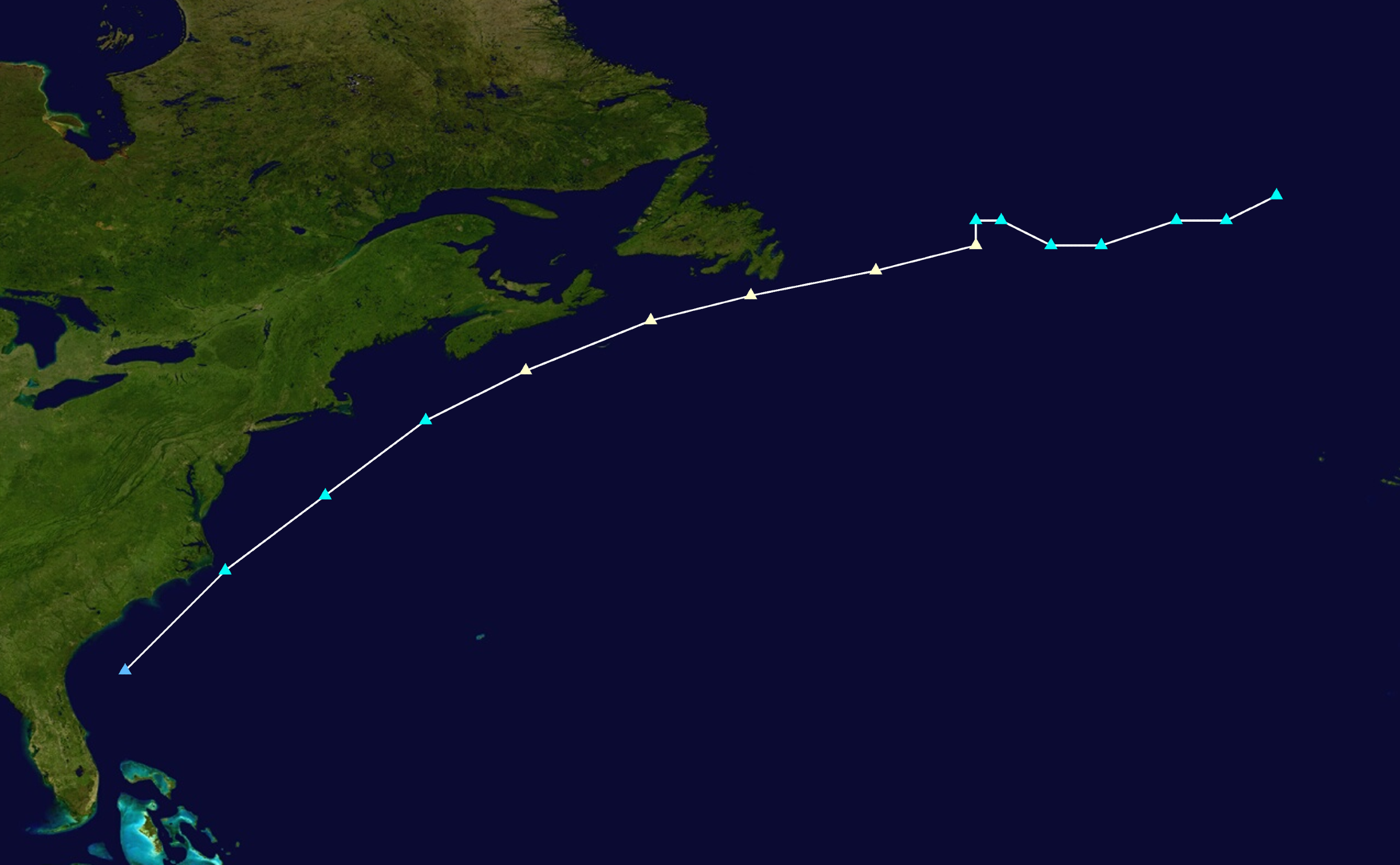
Map plotting the storm's track and intensity, according to the Saffir–Simpson scale Map key Saffir–Simpson scale Tropical depression (≤38 mph, ≤62 km/h) Tropical storm (39–73 mph, 63–118 km/h) Category 1 (74–95 mph, 119–153 km/h) Category 2 (96–110 mph, 154–177 km/h) Category 3 (111–129 mph, 178–208 km/h) Category 4 (130–156 mph, 209–251 km/h) Category 5 (≥157 mph, ≥252 km/h) Unknown Storm type Tropical cyclone Subtropical cyclone Extratropical cyclone, remnant low, tropical disturbance, or monsoon depression

An upper-level disturbance moved eastwards through the Tennessee Valley on February 6, leading to the development of a weak area of low pressure along a stationary front off the coast of Florida later that night. As the storm was expected to strike the Northeastern United States around the day of the Super Bowl, the storm was given the nickname "Super Bowl Sunday Nor'easter". On February 7, the storm emerged into the Atlantic and developed into a nor'easter. The system grew more powerful as it moved northeastward, with the storm's central pressure reaching 994 millibars (29.4 inHg) at 21:00 UTC that day. On the same day, the nor'easter developed strong mesoscale banding from New Jersey to southeastern Massachusetts, resulting in much higher snowfall rates in those areas than initially forecasted.

The nor'easter proceeded to undergo explosive intensification while moving away from the U.S. coastline, with the storm's central pressure dropping from 999 millibars (29.5 inHg) to 968 millibars (28.6 inHg) over a 24-hour period, by 15:00 UTC on February 8. A few hours later, the storm had deepened further, reaching an initial peak intensity of 965 millibars (28.5 inHg) at 18:00 UTC, as the center of the storm passed near Nova Scotia. Afterward, the storm gradually began to weaken as it began moving away from the Canadian coastline. On the next day, the system received the name Wolfram from the Free University of Berlin. Over the next couple of days, the storm slowly out into the open Atlantic, before stalling briefly on February 12. On the same day, the storm spawned two new low-pressure systems and strengthened even further, reaching a peak intensity of 960 millibars (28 inHg). On the next day, the storm began moving northeastward towards Iceland, before stalling for another two days, while another storm, Xanthos, began approaching from the south. On February 16, Xanthos absorbed the cyclone, between Greenland and Iceland.

== Preparations and impact ==
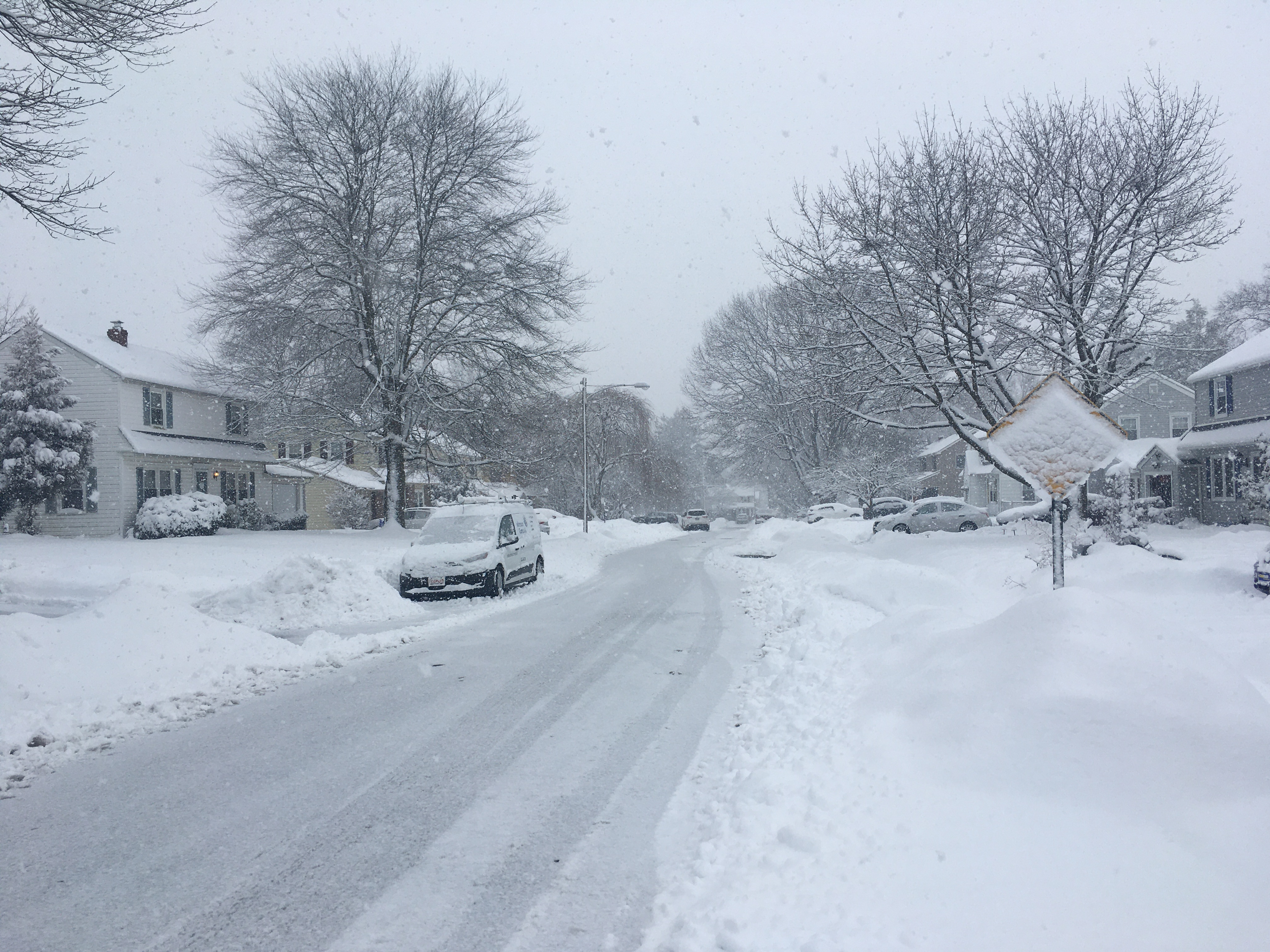
Snow from the nor'easter in Hatboro, Pennsylvania

Early on February 5, Winter Storm Watches were issued in the southern and central Appalachians, due to the upcoming storm. As the day progressed, these watches were extended from south to north along the Mid-Atlantic and New England coast, including Washington, D.C., Philadelphia, New York City, and Boston. The next day, Winter Storm Watches were upgraded to Winter Storm Warnings along the southern and central Appalachians, as well as along the Mid-Atlantic coast. Watches were expanded up into southern New England as well.

=== Northeastern United States ===
In Philadelphia, a snow emergency was declared ahead of the storm. PECO Energy Company activated their emergency response team and brought in additional crews to handle potential power outages. The heaviest snow from the storm in the Philadelphia area fell in the northern and western suburbs, with 9.3 inches (24 cm) in Chalfont, 8.0 inches (20 cm) in Hilltown Township, and 7.6 inches (19 cm) in Doylestown.

In New Jersey, Governor Phil Murphy announced on February 6 that three COVID-19 vaccine megasites, in Burlington, Morris, and Middlesex Counties would be closed the following day, with appointments to be rescheduled to the following week. In New York City, the NYMTA grounded articulated buses for Sunday, February 7, 2021. Areas in Massachusetts prepared for the storm and issued parking bans on Sunday, February 7, ahead of the storm. On February 7, a 16-year-old girl was killed in Upstate New York, and a toddler was injured, in a sledding accident. Following the storm, Sherwood Island State Park was closed to remove snow.

=== Atlantic Canada ===
Over 50 centimetres (20 in) of snow fell in Halifax, Nova Scotia, causing widespread disruption in the city. Similarly disruptive amounts of snowfall were recorded across Nova Scotia, Prince Edward Island, and southern New Brunswick. Newfoundland saw a mix of rain, freezing rain, sleet, and snow. Municipal garbage collection was delayed, Canada Post had to postpone delivering packages, classes were cancelled, businesses and government offices closed and over 10,000 customers of Nova Scotia Power were affected by outages.

== See also ==
- March 6–8, 2018 nor'easter
- January 2–4, 2014 North American blizzard
- February 9–11, 2017 North American blizzard
- February 12–14, 2017 North American blizzard
