= January 2014 North American blizzard =

January 2014 North American blizzard can refer two storms that affected North America in January 2014.

- January 2–4, 2014 North American blizzard – brought a large swath of heavy snow across the Ohio Valley and the Northeastern United States at the start of 2014, and was followed by extremely cold temperatures in its wake.
- January 20–22, 2014 North American blizzard – focused itself on the Interstate 95 corridor and brought over a foot of snow and near-or-at blizzard conditions from Philadelphia, Pennsylvania to Boston, Massachusetts. Also brought very cold temperatures in its wake.
