= January 20–22, 2014 North American blizzard =

Blizzard that affected the Northeast United States in January 2014

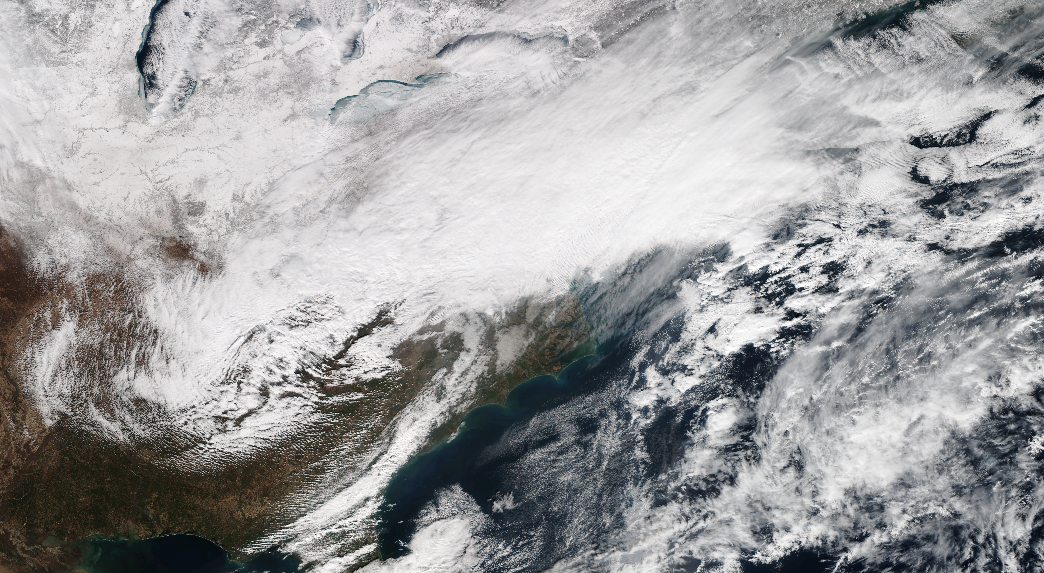
- Satellite image of the developing system responsible for the blizzard affecting the Mid-Atlantic states on January 21, 2014

Meteorological history
- Formed: January 19, 2014
- Exited land: January 22, 2014
- Dissipated: January 24, 2014

Category 1 "Notable" blizzard
- Regional snowfall index: 1.29 (NOAA)
- Highest gusts: 60 mph (97 km/h) in Nantucket, Massachusetts
- Lowest pressure: 962 mbar (hPa); 28.41 inHg
- Max. snowfall: 18.3 in (46 cm) in Norwell, Massachusetts

Overall effects
- Fatalities: 1
- Damage: Unknown
- Areas affected: Midwestern and Northeastern United States, Atlantic Canada
- Power outages: >6,800
- Part of the 2013–14 North American winter

From January 20–22, 2014, a disruptive blizzard, unofficially named Winter Storm Janus by The Weather Channel and other media, affected much of the Mid-Atlantic states and New England, bringing near-or-at blizzard conditions to many and heavy snow accumulations. Originating on January 19 as an Alberta clipper in Canada, the system moved east into the Ohio Valley, dropping light snowfall before moving offshore the East Coast of the United States and soon after strengthening into a powerful winter storm on January 21. The winter storm brought widespread gusty winds and snowfall totals of over 1 foot (12 in) to populated cities, before winding down and moving away from the coast the following day.

Near-blizzard conditions occurred up and down the Interstate 95 corridor, with blizzard warnings issued for southeastern New England. The system, which was not well-forecast in advance and was stronger than anticipated by many, also struck at or near rush hour, which created hazardous conditions and impacts from Washington D.C. to Boston, Massachusetts. States of emergencies were declared in the states of New Jersey, Maryland and more due to the blizzard, which also caused thousands of flights nationwide to be either cancelled or delayed. At least one death was confirmed due to the storm, in Maryland.

== Meteorological history ==
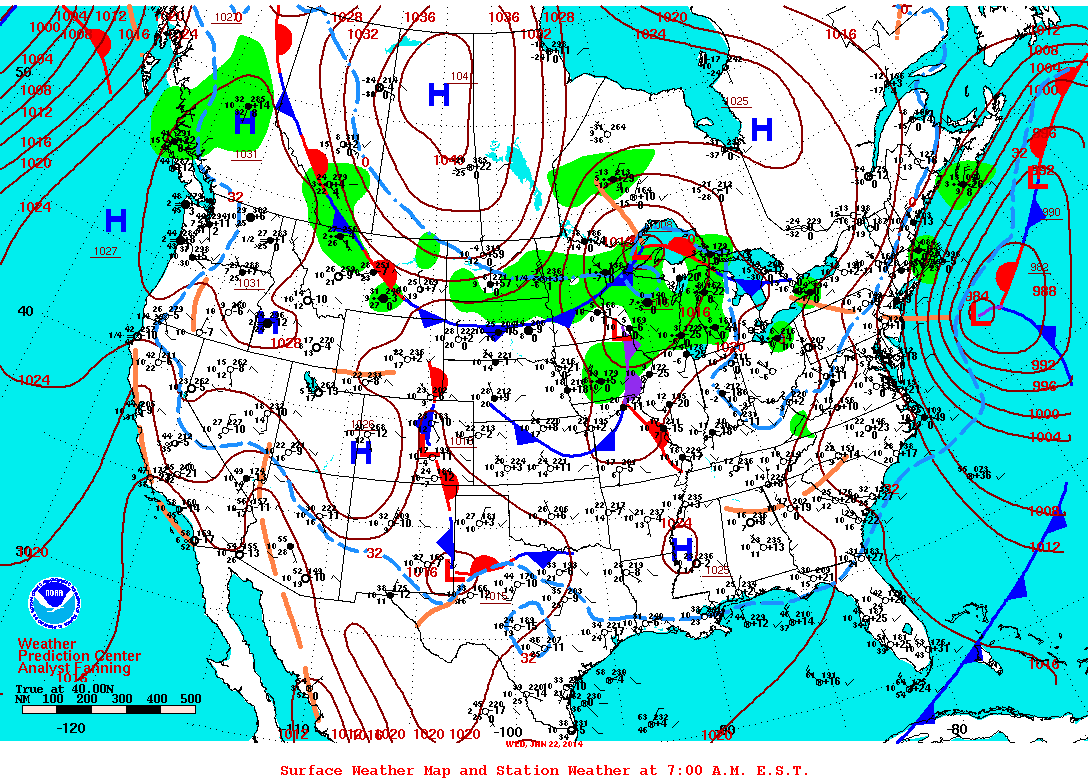
Surface weather map of the blizzard moving off the Northeastern United States coastline on January 22

On January 19, a weak Alberta clipper exited out of Canada, and quickly moved through the Upper Midwest on January 20, dropping little to no accumulations of snowfall. As it moved eastward early on January 21, frontogenesis occurred, and precipitation expanded from Indiana to western Pennsylvania. Then, as it neared the coast, a new area of low pressure developed off the Outer Banks and began to move northwards, as snowfall expanded into parts of the Mid-Atlantic; consequently, by 15:00 UTC on January 21, the Weather Prediction Center (WPC) initiated storm summary bulletins for the developing winter storm. A heavy band of precipitation set up from the cities of Philadelphia to New York City as a result of rapid deepening, leading to high snowfall rates along this corridor and the heaviest accumulations of the event.

The rapid intensification of the system continued with the pressure dropping from 1,004 mb (29.6 inHg) at 15:00 UTC January 21, to 979 mb (28.9 inHg) at 15:00 UTC January 22, a drop of 25 millibars (0.74 inHg) in 24 hours. This created near-blizzard or actual blizzard conditions across the Mid-Atlantic and New England overnight into the following day. The WPC terminated storm summary bulletins as snow gradually tapered off throughout the day on January 22, and system continued to then slowly intensify up to its peak intensity of 962 mb (28.4 inHg) later that day, after which it moved into Atlantic Canada and Nova Scotia regions, gradually weakening before dissipating on January 24.

== Preparations and impact ==
=== United States ===
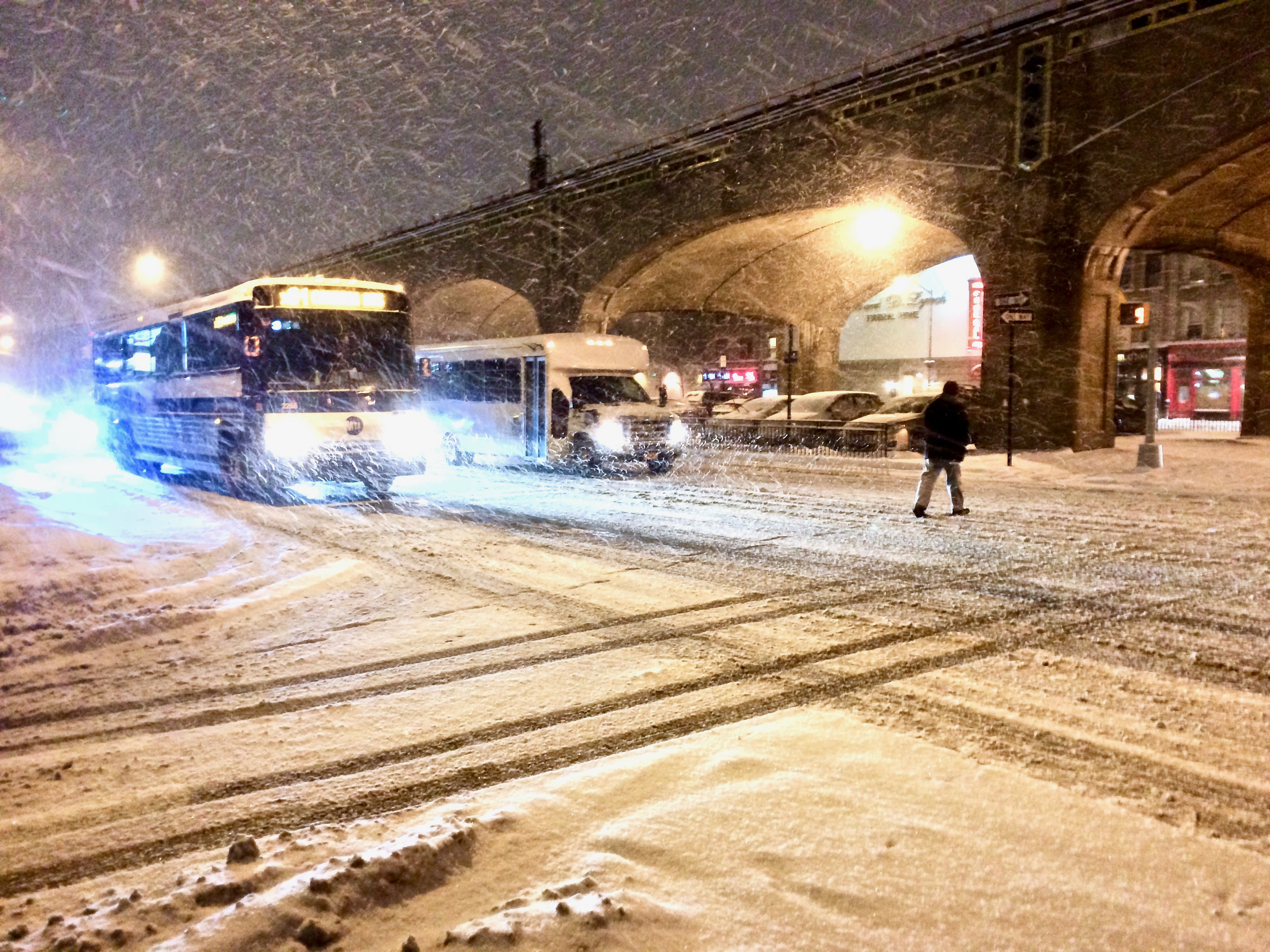
Snowfall in Sunnyside, Queens, New York City on January 21.

Nationwide, approximately 4,000 flights were cancelled, the majority concentrated in the Mid-Atlantic and New England where the worst impacts occurred. Winter storm warnings were issued from the Ohio Valley to much of the Mid-Atlantic and New England, with blizzard warnings issued for the southeastern parts of the latter.

==== Ohio Valley ====
As the developing winter storm moved eastward through the Ohio Valley on January 20–21, snowfall accumulations were generally light, with 1–3 inches (2.5–7.6 cm) generally falling across the region, although isolated amounts of higher totals came as a result of lake-effect snow enhanced by the wind direction following the storm's passage.

==== Mid-Atlantic states ====
===== New Jersey and New York =====
In New Jersey, the blizzard forced Governor Chris Christie to delay his second inauguration ceremony on Ellis Island after winning re-election in the October 2013 gubernatorial election, instead declaring a state of emergency for the entire state as a result. Schools and works allowed early dismissals on January 21, but ended up contributing to gridlock on major roadways as the snow intensified throughout the afternoon; and the Port of New Jersey was also closed which stranded trucks for hours during the night. The Motor Vehicle Commission closed all 39 of its offices in New Jersey as of noon on January 21. By the evening, state police reported hundreds of crashes. Courthouses across New Jersey also closed for the day due to the storm. The heaviest totals in the state were focused across a region stretching from Philadelphia to New York City, with many locations receiving over a foot of snow, the highest being 15.2 inches (39 cm) in the town of Manalapan.

The metro regions of New York were also put under a state of emergency by Governor Andrew Cuomo, who advised residents in the affected cities, specifically New York City, to hunker down and avoid travel. Mayor Bill de Blasio activated emergency preparations and implemented alternate-side parking rules, while approximately 1,700 snow plows were mobilized to clear snow from roadways. Despite forecasts of heavy snow, the Broadway theatre remained open on January 21. New York City received approximately 11.2 inches (28 cm) of snow from the blizzard, with slightly higher totals in the suburban areas of the city.

===== Pennsylvania =====
A snow emergency was declared in the city of Philadelphia by officials due to expected heavy snow accumulations, and also caused an NHL game scheduled between the Philadelphia Flyers and Carolina Hurricanes to be postponed. Dozens of crashes were reported by police near the peak of the storm after travel restrictions had been implemented on most of the major roadways in the city. The city recorded a total of 14 inches (36 cm) of snow, which aside from a daily record for January 21, was the third time during the 2013–14 winter that Philadelphia was impacted by a winter storm that dropped at least 6 inches (15 cm) or more of snow, a record at the time.

===== Delaware, Maryland and Virginia =====
Delaware declared a state of emergency by mid-day on January 21. School districts closed mid-day, and the Delaware General Assembly was forced to end early. Governor Jack Markell stated that the state's Department of Transportation was actively working to clear the roads and urged residents to stay home. 400 pieces of equipment were deployed to clear roadways, and some of the Delaware National Guard was deployed to assist in support efforts during the storm. Approximately 6,800 people lost power from the blizzard as estimated by the Delaware Electric Cooperative (DEC).

One person was confirmed to have died in Maryland after being ejected from their car in a deadly car crash that occurred near Baltimore on a snow-covered roadway. As of late January 21, 40 accidents had been reported in Montgomery County. Schools in other counties in the state also announced that they would be closed January 22. In Washington D.C., public schools closed and the federal government opted to delay opening for at least two hours on January 22.

In Virginia, many schools closed for January 22 due to the storm. Snow accumulations across the state were fairly light, except for the northernmost portions of the state, where heavier totals fell closer to the cities.

==== New England ====
===== Connecticut and Rhode Island =====
Metro-North Railroad in Connecticut told residents that delays were likely on several of the railroad lines due to snow covering some of the tracks. Additionally, schools closed for January 22 in the major cities, including Hartford and New Haven.

Schools were closed in Rhode Island due to forecasts of heavy snowfall accumulation of up to a foot of snow. By late on January 21, police had responded to over 40 car crashes on major roadways.

===== Massachusetts =====
Due to the storm, Governor Charlie Baker cancelled his State of the State address that was scheduled for the evening of January 21. Schools were also cancelled for the following day in Boston, while state employees were sent home for the day.

=== Atlantic Canada ===
Following the departure of the system from the Northeastern United States, the storm tracked northeastwards into Atlantic Canada, dumping as much as 1.5–2 feet (18–24 in; 46–61 cm) of snow there.

== See also ==
- January 2–4, 2014 North American blizzard – the previous winter storm that impacted similar areas.
- January 2015 North American blizzard – a stronger blizzard that impacted nearly the same areas with a very similar origin.
- January 2016 United States blizzard – crippling and historic blizzard that dropped up to 3 feet (36 in) in nearly the same exact areas.
