= February 9–11, 2017 North American blizzard =

Winter weather event

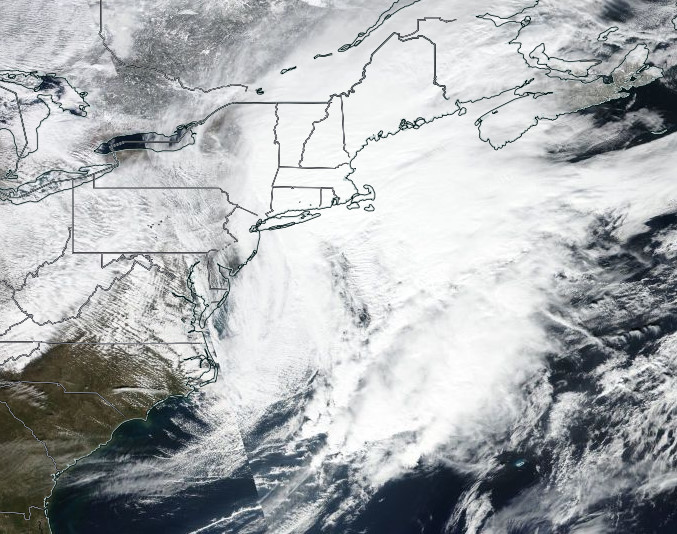
- The blizzard rapidly deepening just offshore of the Northeastern United States on February 9

Meteorological history
- Formed: February 6, 2017
- Exited land: February 10, 2017
- Dissipated: February 11, 2017

Category 1 "Notable" blizzard
- Regional snowfall index: 2.15 (NOAA)
- Highest gusts: 70 mph (110 km/h) near Hyannis, Massachusetts
- Lowest pressure: 969 mbar (hPa); 28.61 inHg
- Max. snowfall: 24.0 in (61 cm) near Cooper, Maine

Overall effects
- Fatalities: 1 total
- Damage: Unknown
- Areas affected: Central Plains, Midwest, Ohio Valley, Northeast (Mid-Atlantic states, especially the New England states), Atlantic Canada, Greenland
- Power outages: 80,000+
- Part of the 2016–17 North American winter

From February 8–9, 2017, a fast-moving but powerful blizzard, unofficially named Winter Storm Niko by The Weather Channel, affected the Northeastern United States with winter weather and very heavy snowfall. Forming as an Alberta clipper in the northern United States, the system initially produced light snowfall from the Midwest to the Ohio Valley as it tracked southeastwards. It eventually reached the East Coast of the United States and began to rapidly grow into a powerful nor'easter. Up to 18 inches (46 cm) of snow as well as blizzard conditions were recorded in some of the hardest hit areas before the system moved away from the coastline early on February 10.

Prior to the blizzard, unprecedented and record-breaking warmth had enveloped the region, with record highs of above 60 °F (16 °C) recorded in several areas, including Central Park in New York City. Some were caught off guard by the warmth and had little time to prepare for the snowstorm, with some meteorologists calling the extreme weather changes "unprecedented".

== Meteorological history ==
On February 6, an Alberta clipper developed near the Canada–United States border and dove southeastwards. With relatively little moisture to supply it, initial snowfall totals in the Plains and Midwest were light, ranging from 1–3 inches (2.5–7.6 cm). The system quickly advanced eastwards through the heart of the country, and by 18:00 UTC on February 8, a surface low had developed over the Arkansas–Tennessee state border. This low would become the dominant low of the system as it continued towards the Northeastern United States, while also producing light to moderate snow across the Ohio Valley since there was enough cold air in place from a departing storm system. As the clipper system neared the tri-state area, it began to steadily intensify and produce more moderate and heavy snow while beginning to make the transition into a nor'easter.

By 09–12:00 UTC on February 9, the low had begun to move just offshore near the Delaware coastline. As very heavy snow bands (with snowfall rates of 2–4 inches (5.1–10.2 cm) in some spots) set up offshore, forecasters noted that the low was likely to rapidly deepen – or in meteorological terms, bomb out – due to the temperature contrast between the cold air to its north and moisture feeding into the storm from the warm waters of the Gulf Stream. Indeed, the storm had undergone this process, meeting the criteria for bombogenesis, with the central pressure dropping from 1,005 millibars (29.7 inHg) at 18:00 UTC on February 8 to 977 millibars (28.9 inHg) by 18:00 UTC on February 9 while it was offshore the New Jersey coastline. Snow slowly began to subside in areas such as eastern Pennsylvania and western New Jersey. The storm system was absorbed by another system forming off the coast of Greenland on February 11.

== Preparations and impact ==
=== United States ===
On February 8, winter storm warnings were issued for much of the Northeast, including a blizzard warning for parts of Long Island. More than 2,400 flights were cancelled across the affected regions.

==== New York and New Jersey ====
On February 8, Mayor Bill de Blasio announced that schools in New York City would be closed the following day, due to the impending snowstorm. Advising residents to stay indoors and stay off the roads, Sanitation Commissioner Kathryn Garcia stated, "This will be a very dangerous storm. Luckily it’s not likely to last very long, only a few hours, but during the period of time that it’s coming down it’ll be extraordinarily difficult to drive. So I want to encourage everyone who can take mass transit to please do that." To also avoid a disaster that had happened the year before where several residents were trapped even after the snow subsided due to plows being unable to access certain roads, several smaller equipment and trucks were bought in order to plow the streets in the aftermath. About 2,300 salt spreaders and plows were prepared to plow the streets as of early February 9. Regarding the sudden change from record-high temperatures to a snowstorm, Mayor Bill de Blasio cited that it was "unlike anything [I've] seen in my life. What almost feels like a summer day almost, now, and tomorrow a blizzard."

Slick roads were responsible for two jackknifed MTA buses early on February 9 in Manhattan, however no injuries were reported. In Long Island, a tractor trailer was involved in an accident with multiple vehicles. No injuries were reported. Blizzard-like conditions were also observed in areas mainly near the freeways such as Interstate 95. One death was confirmed when a 59-year old doorman slipped and fell through a glass door in New York City on East 93rd Street, causing injuries to his face and neck. He was rushed to the hospital where he was pronounced dead.

Late on February 8, New Jersey Governor Chris Christie announced that all state offices would be closed due to the snowstorm, advising workers to stay home. Many schools were also closed as well. By mid-day on February 9, state police had informed news outlets that they had responded to around 145 crashes since midnight. A 45 mph (72 km/h) speed limit was implemented on the Garden State Parkway from exit 125 to the northern state line. Transit services were also suspended.

==== Connecticut ====
Interstate 95 was shut down in both directions on February 9 due to reports of several vehicles stuck on both sides of the road. The Connecticut State Police advised residents on Twitter to "please stay home if possible". Bradley International Airport also closed due to the snowstorm, as well as several transit services being temporarily suspended. Bradley International Airport realized their 4th snowiest calendar day on record with 15.5 inches (39 cm) of snow.

On Interstate 95, multiple sections were also closed due to one report of a jackknifed tractor trailer in West Haven early on February 9. The cause of the crash has not yet been determined. Another section was closed due to a three-vehicle accident on the southbound lanes of the Pearl Harbor Memorial Bridge.

==== Rhode Island and Massachusetts ====
A state legislative meeting between Representatives and Senators was reportedly cancelled as well as all legislative meetings on February 9. Travel and parking bans were also put into place in many towns, including Providence, as well as the cancellations of most schools. Blizzard conditions were recorded in at least four locations in Rhode Island, including Block Island, North Smithfield, Providence, and Westerly. The criteria for blizzard conditions are met when falling and/or blowing snow drops visibility to 0.25 mi (0.40 km) or less, and sustained winds reach at least 35 mph (56 km/h) for at least three hours.

Schools in Boston, Massachusetts were closed because of the storms. Governor Charlie Baker announced on February 8 a two-hour delay for any non-emergency state employees, in order for crews to quickly treat roads and respond to any crashes that occur. Blizzard conditions were recorded in at least eight locations in Massachusetts, including Beverly, Boston, Chatham, Hyannis, Marshfield, Martha's Vineyard, New Bedford, and Provincetown.

==== Pennsylvania ====
In Philadelphia, a snow emergency was declared late on February 8, stating that all parked cars had to be moved off the affected areas. Snow across the Philadelphia metropolitan area was less than anticipated.

=== Canada ===
In Atlantic Canada, accumulations of snow were reported between 10 and 30 centimetres (4 and 12 in) on February 9 and 10th with the maximum axis along Nova Scotia, Prince Edward Island and Western Newfoundland.

== See also ==
- January 2014 North American blizzard
- January 2015 North American blizzard
- Early January 2017 North American winter storm
- February 12–14, 2017 North American blizzard
