= February 12–14, 2017 North American blizzard =

Blizzard affecting Northeastern United States and Eastern Canada

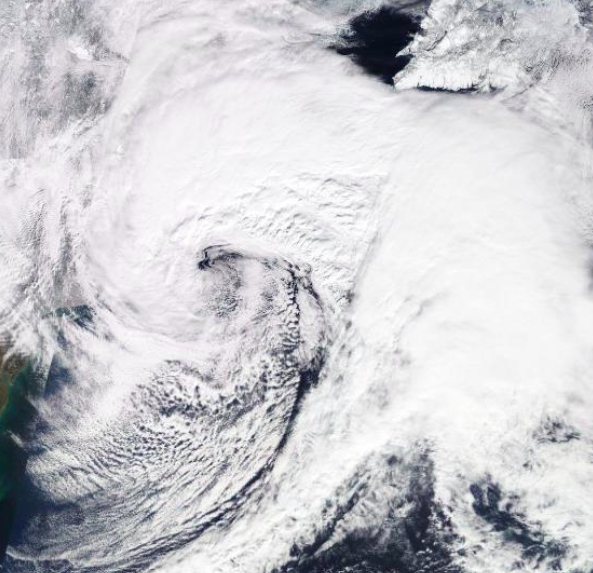
- Satellite imagery of the blizzard impacting the Northeastern United States on February 13

Meteorological history
- Formed: February 12, 2017
- Dissipated: February 17, 2017

Blizzard
- Highest gusts: 72 mph (116 km/h) at Westchester County Airport, New York
- Lowest pressure: 968 hPa (mbar); 28.59 inHg
- Max. snowfall: 40 in (100 cm) at Glenburn, Maine

Overall effects
- Fatalities: 2
- Damage: ≥ $3.9 million (2017 USD)
- Areas affected: Great Lakes, Mid-Atlantic states, Northeastern United States, Eastern Canada
- Power outages: >6,000
- Part of the 2016–17 North American winter

The February 12–14, 2017 North American blizzard was a strong and historic nor'easter that affected the Northeastern United States and Eastern Canada from February 12–14. It impacted the Northeastern United States less than a week after the February 9–11, 2017 North American blizzard. This blizzard was more localized and less widespread than the previous storm, but snow totals were higher in some areas, including portions of Maine and Vermont. The system caused two fatalities and is estimated to have caused over $3.9 million (2017 USD) in damages. It was unofficially named Winter Storm Orson by The Weather Channel.

== Meteorological history ==
The system originated as a weak low-pressure system over the Great Lakes region early on February 12, which quickly began to strengthen due to abundant moisture. It quickly moved eastwards into the Mid-Atlantic states by 18:00 UTC, with precipitation bands developing by that time. The system then underwent bombogenesis off the Mid-Atlantic coast on February 13, deepening to a peak intensity of 968 millibars (28.6 inHg) at 18:00 UTC on February 13. The system then slowed its movement down, stalling out in the Gulf of Maine and resulting in prolonged periods of heavy snow. It began moving again on February 14, moving into Canada and beginning to weaken. The low-pressure continued slowly weakening before dissipating early on February 15.

== Preparations and impact ==
=== Northeastern United States ===
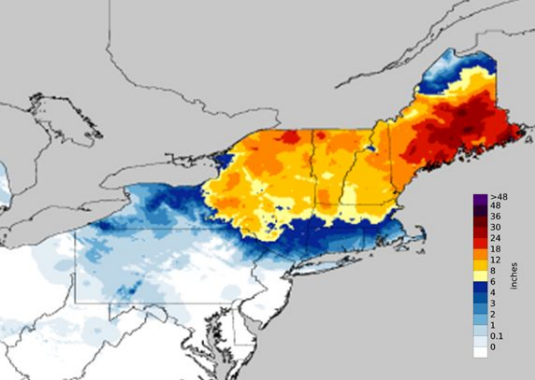
Map of observed snowfall accumulations in the Northeastern United States from the storm

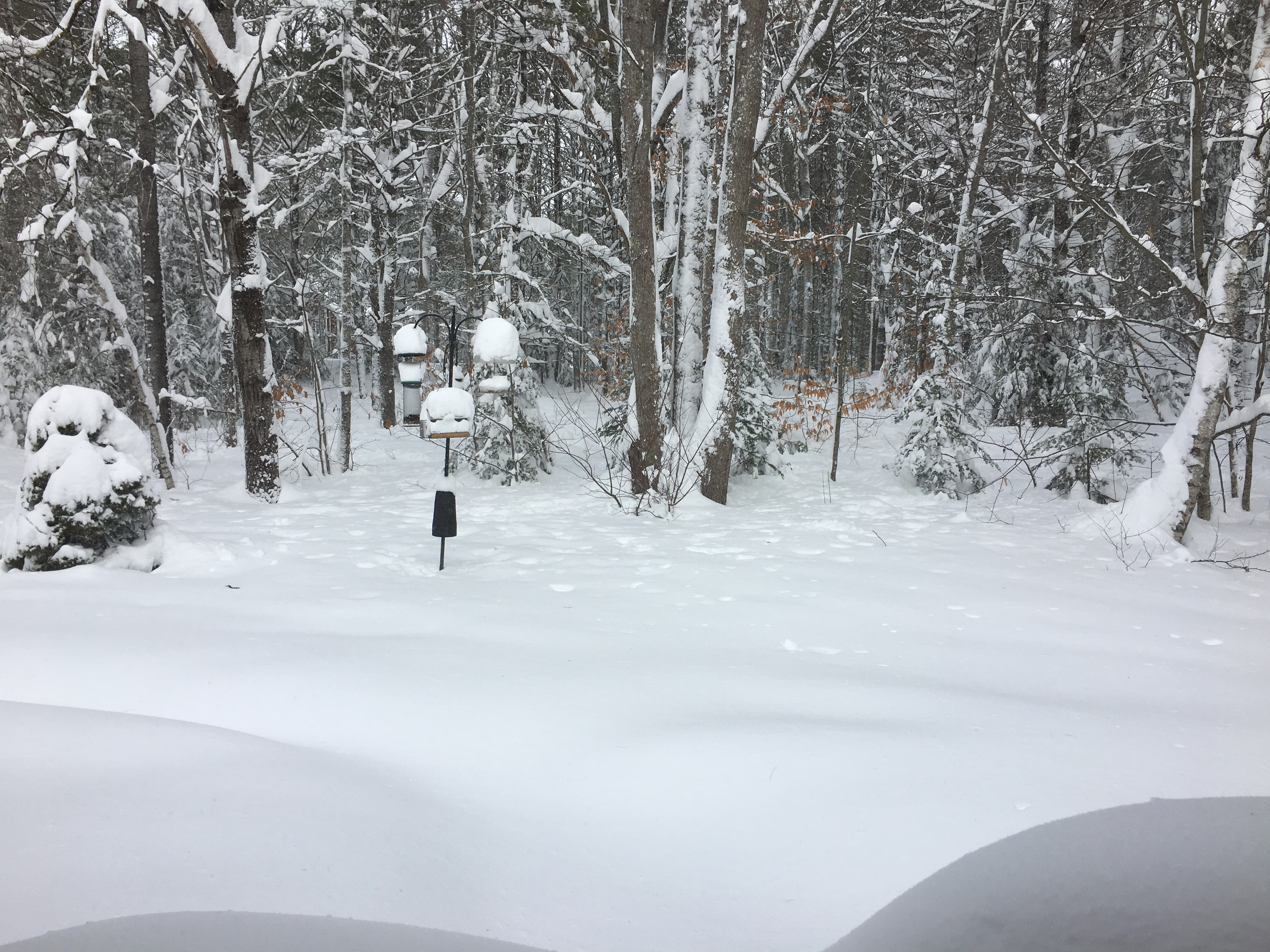
Over 25 inches (64 cm) of snow in the Mid Coast of Maine after the storm

There were heavy snowfall amounts across New England with a large swath of 1–2 feet (0.30–0.61 m) from Upstate New York to Eastern Maine. The snow caused widespread travel problems, such as numerous automobile accidents, and other hardships such as a collapsed roof in Millinocket, Maine. The strong wind gusts downed trees and power lines with some trees crushing houses. Schools, businesses, medical offices, public transportation and government offices were shut down in a large part of the Northeast while flights and events were cancelled, such as courses at the University of Maine and the University of Southern Maine.

One man was killed in by a falling large tree branch through the windshield of his vehicle in Mechanicsburg, Pennsylvania, and a 60-year-old died in an accident with a snowplow in Massachusetts. Winds resulted in a tree falling down on the Metro-North Railroad in Westchester, causing major delays. Property damages was estimated at $3.9 million, mainly due to winds.

Maine was among the hardest states hit from this storm, the highest snowfall total of 36 inches (91 cm) was recorded near Jonesboro. In Bangor, a 24-hour snowfall record was broken, with 21.5 in (54.6 cm) falling in one day. The storm was also Bangor's fourth largest snow event on record, and many other locations including Waterville and Lewiston received over 18 inches of snow. New Hampshire was also one of the hardest hit states from the storm, where many locations received over two feet of snow. The snow highest total in New Hampshire was in Jefferson, which received 29 inches (74 cm).

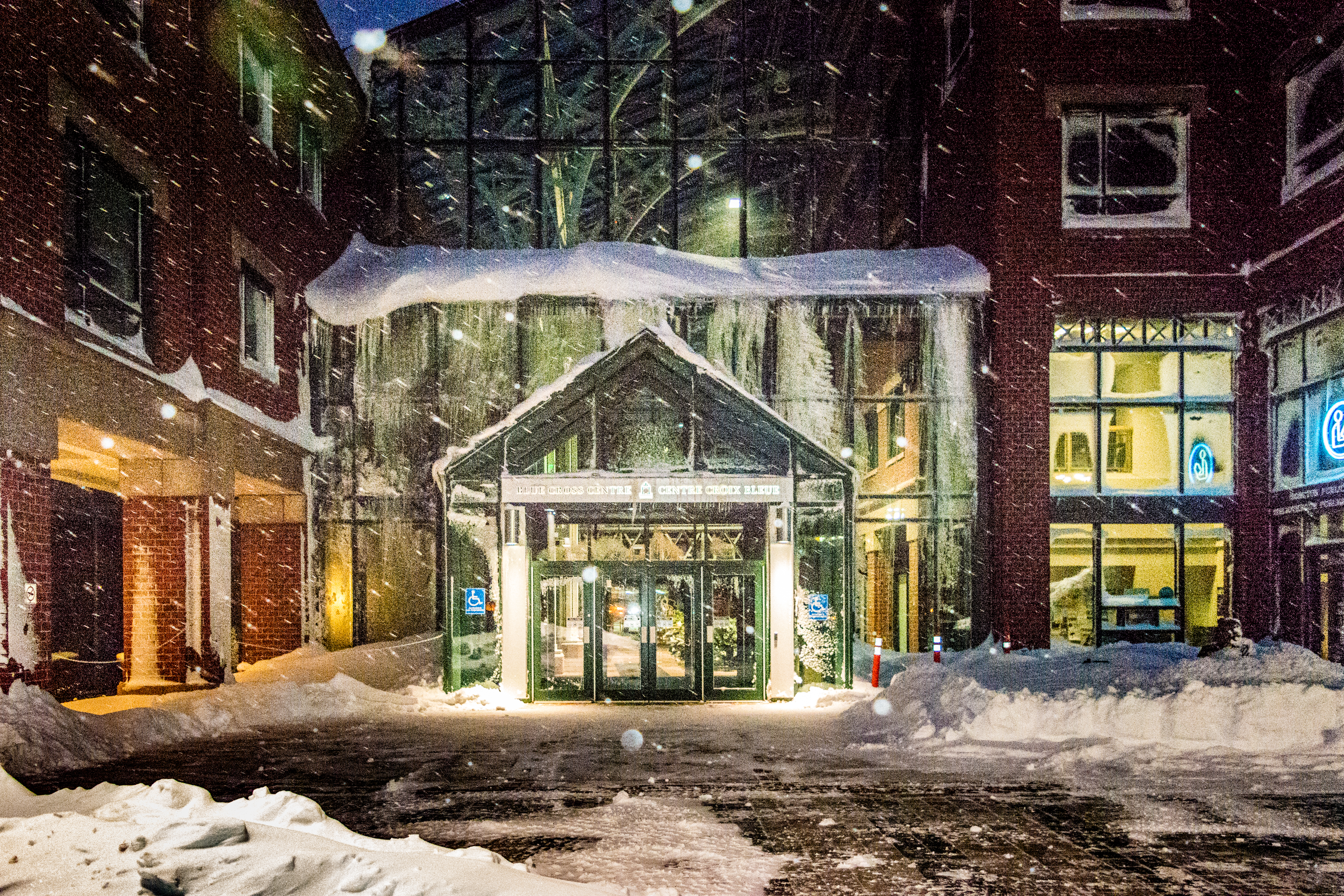
The public library in Moncton, New Brunswick, before dawn on February 14, 2017

Wind gusts of 50–65 mph (80–105 km/h) were recorded from West Virginia to Maine with a peak gust of 72 mph (116 km/h) at Westchester County Airport, New York. In Washington, D.C., parts of a three-story apartment building's roof was blown off by the 66 mph (106 km/h) gusts in the area. A fallen tree on the tracks just north of New York City, was struck by a commuter train with around 100 passengers on board, stopping service for hours.

=== Eastern Canada ===
In Southern Quebec and Eastern Ontario, most observed snowfall totals were 10–30 centimetres (3.9–11.8 in) with the highest totals in the Montreal–Eastern Townships corridor.

The Meteorological Service of Canada issued winter weather warnings for northern Nova Scotia, New Brunswick, the east and south coasts of Newfoundland, and all of Prince Edward Island. School districts in most of these areas closed schools. Vast areas of the Maritimes received high snowfall totals with over 70 centimetres (28 in) in Fredericton, New Brunswick and 60 centimetres (24 in) in St. John's, Newfoundland and Labrador. Wind gusts reaching 120 km/h (75 mph) were recorded along the coast near Halifax. All public transit in the area was cancelled. Nova Scotia Power and NB Power reported over 6,000 customers without electricity after the storm.

== See also ==
- January 2014 United States blizzard
- January 2015 North American blizzard
- Early January 2017 North American winter storm
- February 9–11, 2017 North American blizzard
