= January 2015 North American blizzard =

2015 snowstorm in eastern North America

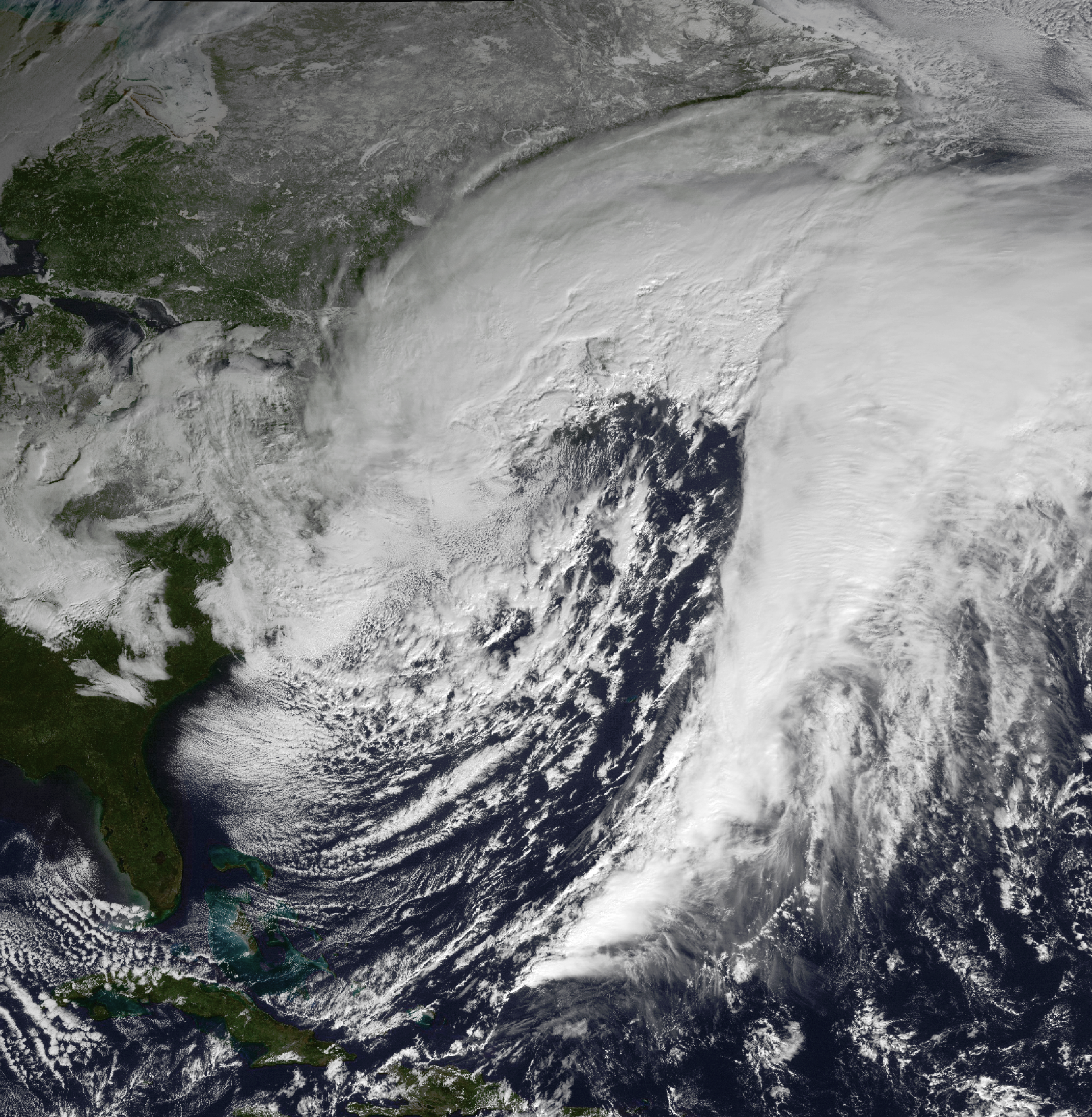
- Satellite image of the blizzard at peak intensity at 14:45 UTC (9:45 a.m. EST) on January 27, 2015

Meteorological history
- Formed: January 23, 2015
- Exited land: January 28, 2015
- Dissipated: January 31, 2015

Category 3 "Major" blizzard
- Regional snowfall index: 6.16 (NOAA)
- Highest winds: 75 mph (120 km/h) (1-minute sustained winds)
- Highest gusts: 153 km/h (95 mph)
- Lowest pressure: 970 mbar (hPa); 28.64 inHg
- Max. snowfall: 36.0 in (91 cm) in Lunenburg, Milford, Auburn, and Hudson, and Oxford, Massachusetts

Overall effects
- Fatalities: 3 total
- Damage: $500 million (2015 USD)
- Areas affected: Pacific Northwest, Central United States, Eastern United States, Atlantic Canada, Southern Greenland, Portugal, Spain, France
- Part of the 2014–15 North American winter

From January 24–28, 2015, a powerful and severe blizzard, unofficially named Winter Storm Juno by The Weather Channel and other media, or more commonly the Blizzard of 2015, dumped up to 3 feet (910 mm) of snowfall in parts of New England. Originating from a disturbance just off the coast of the Northwestern United States on January 23, it initially produced a light swath of snow as it traveled southeastwards into the Midwest as an Alberta clipper on January 24–25. It gradually weakened as it moved eastwards towards the Atlantic Ocean, however, a new dominant low formed off the East Coast of the United States late on January 26, and rapidly deepened as it moved northeastwards towards southeastern New England, producing pronounced blizzard conditions over the following day. It slowly weakened afterwards, moving into Nova Scotia on January 28 before dissipating in the northern Atlantic on January 31.

The blizzard disrupted transportation, with snow emergencies declared in six states and travel bans enacted in four of these states – Connecticut, New Jersey, Massachusetts, and Rhode Island – as well as in New York City. Additionally, blizzard warnings were issued for much of the I-95 corridor from Philadelphia, Pennsylvania to Boston, Massachusetts, with meteorologists and experts the potential for "historic" and "record-breaking" snowfall totals of up to 2–3 feet (24–36 in; 61–91 cm) in the major metropolitan areas, including New York City. Most passenger rail service was suspended, and thousands of flights were cancelled. Schools and activities saw weather-related cancellations for one or more days. In a first for New York City, New York Governor Andrew Cuomo made the decision to shut down the city's subway system; it had never previously been closed due to snow.

Very gusty winds were reported from the storm, especially in New England, peaking close to 100 mph (160 km/h) in Atlantic Canada. of which the storm began a month-long period in which the city of Boston would accumulate record amounts of seasonal snowfall. However, snowfall fell significantly short of what was anticipated, mainly due to a shift of the storm's track. After the storm had passed, a number of New York City residents criticized Cuomo's decision to shut down the subway; the blizzard dropped much less snow in the city than originally expected, totaling 9.8 inches (25 cm) in Central Park. The models were 50 miles off; the storm failed to bring moisture back to New York City and New Jersey. At least 3 people died as a result of the storm and damages were estimated to be US$500 million (2015 USD).

== Meteorological history ==
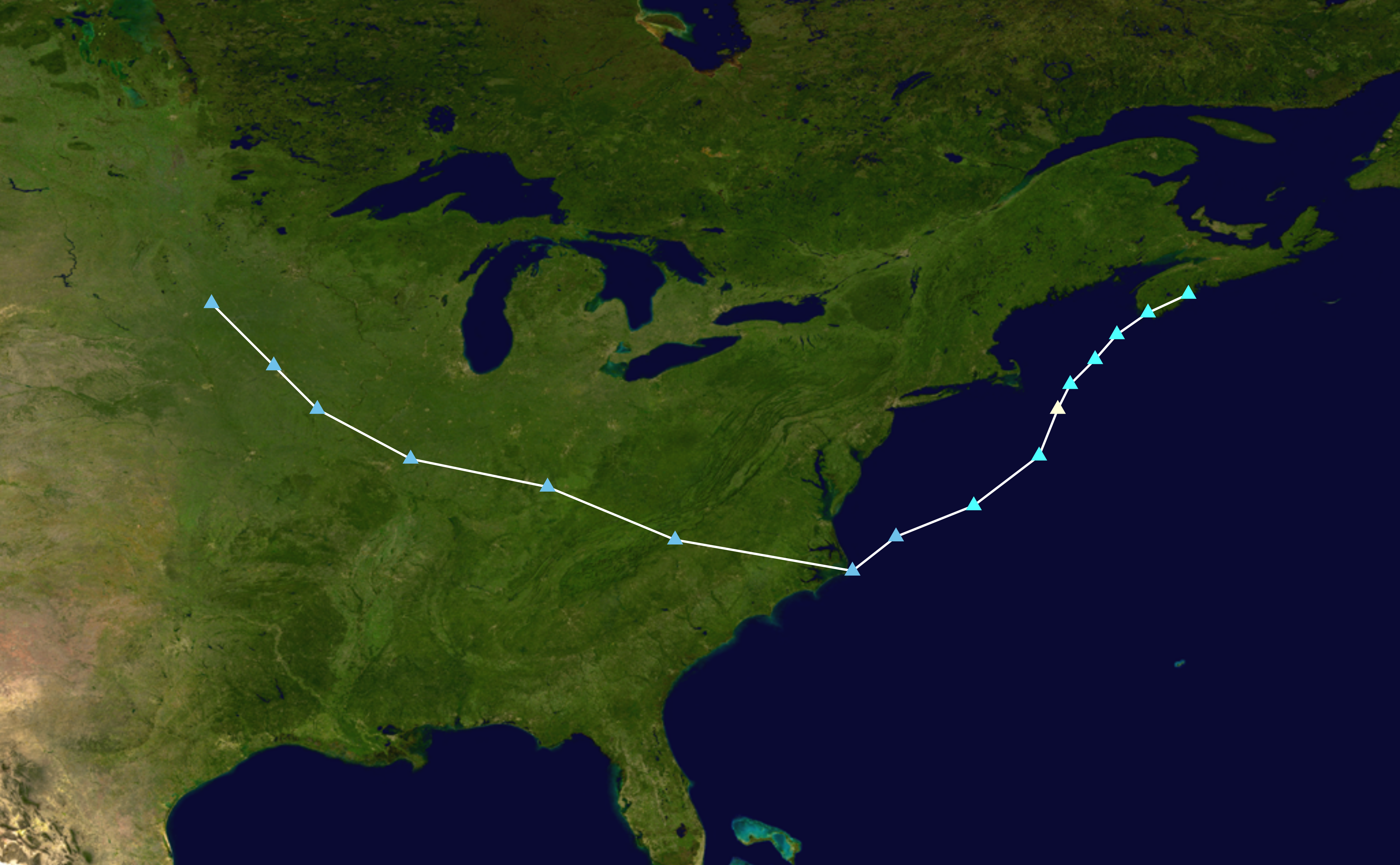
Map plotting the storm's track and intensity, according to the Saffir–Simpson scale Map key Saffir–Simpson scale Tropical depression (≤38 mph, ≤62 km/h) Tropical storm (39–73 mph, 63–118 km/h) Category 1 (74–95 mph, 119–153 km/h) Category 2 (96–110 mph, 154–177 km/h) Category 3 (111–129 mph, 178–208 km/h) Category 4 (130–156 mph, 209–251 km/h) Category 5 (≥157 mph, ≥252 km/h) Unknown Storm type Tropical cyclone Subtropical cyclone Extratropical cyclone, remnant low, tropical disturbance, or monsoon depression

On January 23, a low-pressure area developed off the Pacific Northwest, before moving over the Canadian Prairies by January 24. The storm system quickly moved southeastward into the Upper Midwest during the evening of January 24, taking a path typical of an Alberta clipper. As it progressed southward, the storm intensified, with frontogenesis occurring the next day. By noon on January 25, the upper-level low was centered near the border between Iowa and Missouri in correlation with a weak shortwave trough. Moisture from the Gulf of Mexico wrapped around the system from the south, resulting in widespread rainfall and snow over portions of the Midwest. Throughout the day, the system traversed eastward along the Kentucky-Tennessee border. Snowfall remained concentrated along a cold front north of the Ohio River.

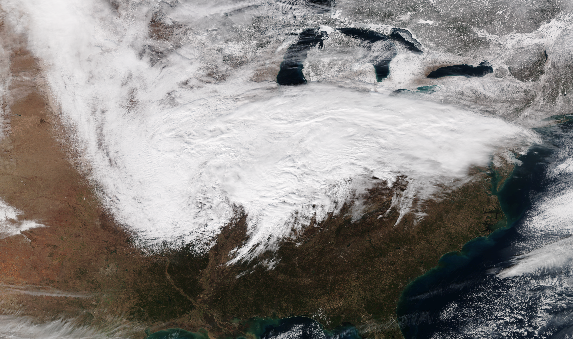
The precursor to the blizzard tracking across the Ohio Valley, as an Alberta clipper on January 25, 2015.

At 09:00 UTC on January 26, the Weather Prediction Center (WPC) began issuing storm summaries on the developing disturbance while the low-pressure system was centered near Bluefield, West Virginia. At the time, mixed precipitation was occurring over northern Appalachia. As this system tracked eastward, it gradually weakened; however, at the same time, a new low-pressure system formed off the coast of North Carolina and began to track north-northeastward. The new center began rapidly strengthening, eventually becoming the dominant low of the storm, peaking at hurricane-force winds and a central pressure of 970 mb (29 inHg) early on January 27. Early on January 30, the nor'easter left the East Coast, even as another winter storm began to impact the region. During the next day, the former nor'easter continued to accelerate eastward across the North Atlantic, even as it rapidly weakened. On January 31, the winter storm was absorbed by a much more powerful extratropical cyclone developing over Western Europe.

== Preparations ==
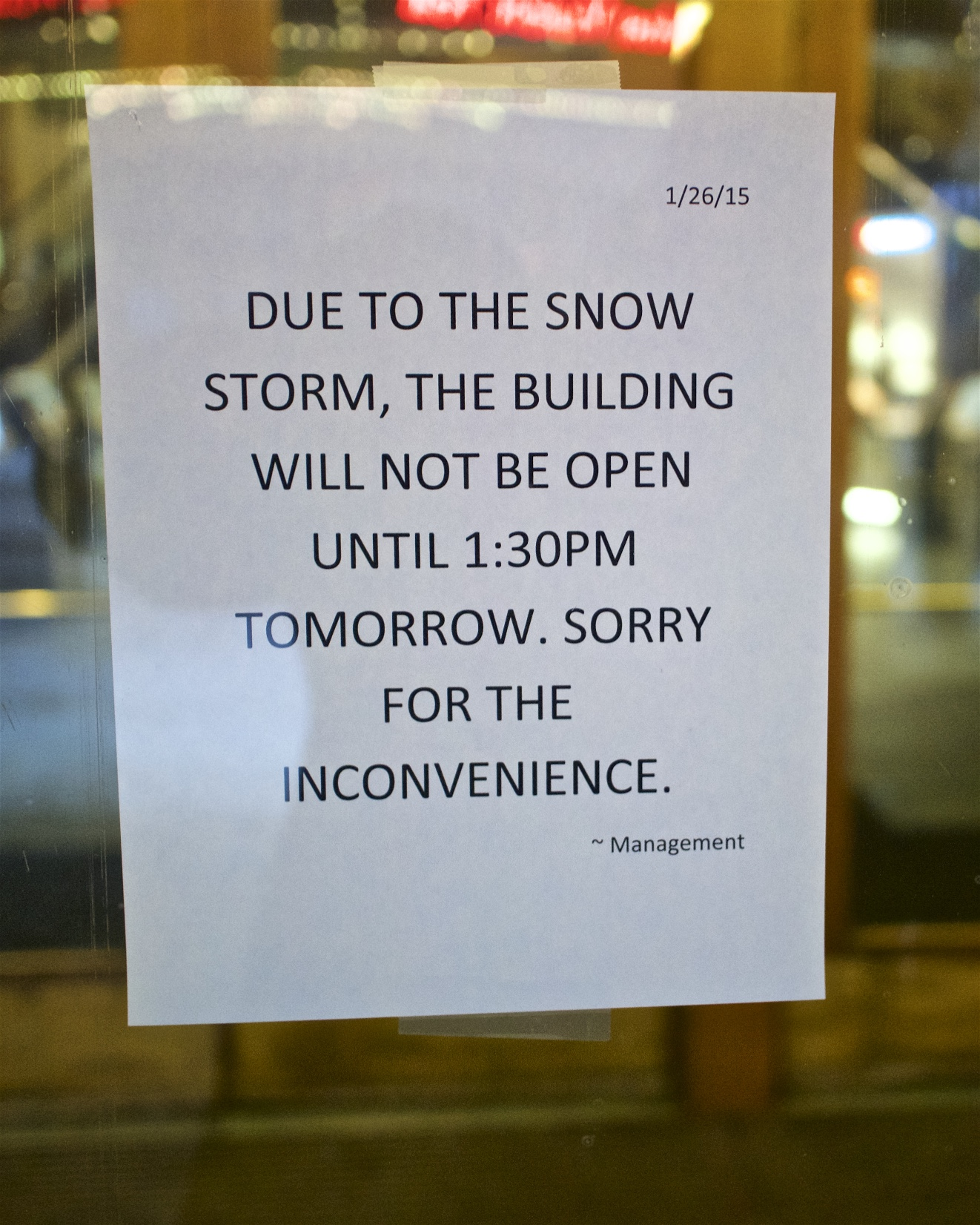
A sign on doors at the AMC Empire 25 multiplex in Times Square, New York City, advising customers that the theater had closed in advance of the storm.

On January 25, 2015, blizzard warnings were issued for areas of coastal New England, New York and New Jersey. High winds and heavy snow were forecast for the evening of January 26 and all day January 27, impacting a 250-mile area from New York City to Boston. On January 26, many roads in New York and New England were closed to all vehicles except emergency vehicles due to life-threatening conditions on area roadways.

Many churches and other houses of prayer remained open to those in need of a warming center.

At the height of the storm, a 300-mile (480 km) stretch of Interstate 95 from northern New Jersey to the Massachusetts/New Hampshire border was closed in conjunction with travel bans in the impacted areas. Portions of Interstates 78, 80, 84, 87, 90, 91 and 93 were also shut down by the storm.

=== Northeastern United States ===
==== Mid-Atlantic states ====
===== Pennsylvania, New Jersey, New York =====
In preparation for the winter storm, the Pennsylvania Department of Transportation deployed approximately 350 salting trucks to treat major roadways. On January 26, Pennsylvania Governor Tom Wolf signed a disaster emergency proclamation in an attempt to distribute state resources as quickly as possible. Philadelphia Mayor Michael Nutter closed municipal offices and schools for January 27 and cancelled trash collection for the day. Meanwhile, SEPTA's bus lines closed while its train system ran 24 hours a day for Monday and Tuesday. According to the Philadelphia Office of Emergency Management, the snow emergency declaration was lifted at 6:00 a.m. Tuesday morning.

In New Jersey, the South Brunswick Police Department said in a press release on January 25 that additional officers and public works staff would be on duty throughout the storm. The department urged residents to make preparations in anticipation that travel would be impossible for several days. The Monroe Township Office of Emergency Management released a guideline to ensure residents were safe and prepared for the nor'easter. New Jersey Governor Chris Christie declared a state of emergency for the duration of the storm; in a morning press conference, Christie also urged all nonessential personnel to remain off roadways. A travel ban was issued later that day, to be put in effect on January 26 at 11 pm; Amtrak and New Jersey Transit services were also suspended.

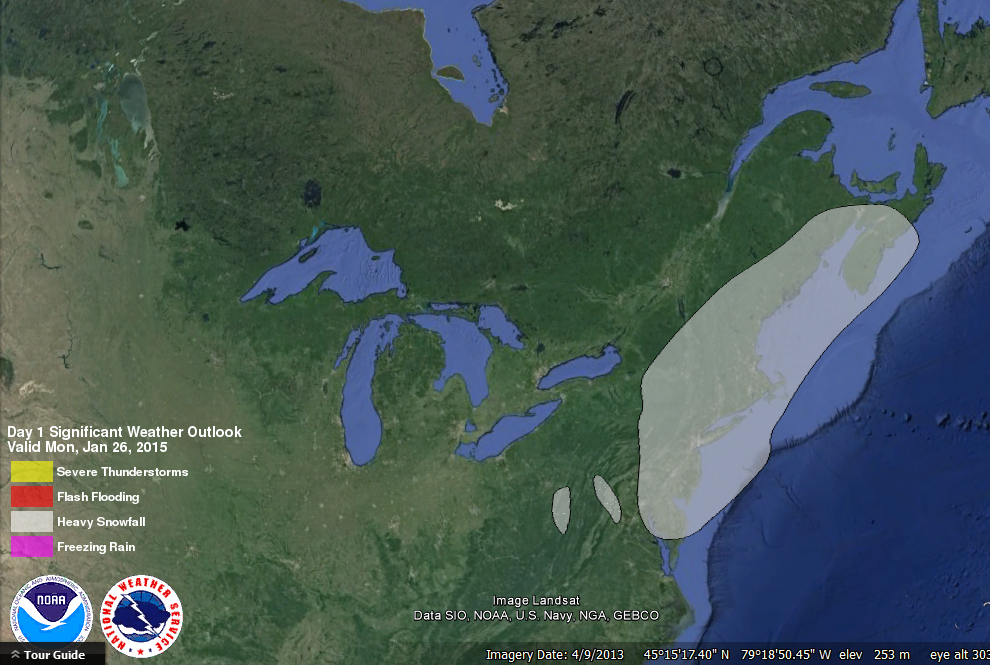
Significant Weather Outlook issued for the Northeast on January 26

In a statement on January 25, New York Governor Andrew Cuomo urged residents to take their necessary safety precautions and prepare for the possibility of disrupted commute on Monday and Tuesday. The Metropolitan Transportation Authority deployed extra crews, salting trucks, and chained tires. Delta Air Lines promised full refunds for flights significantly delayed. The State Emergency Operations Center in Albany was expected to be staffed beginning early on January 26 to coordinate with all affected counties. At least 1,806 plows and 126,000 tons of salt were expected to be divided across the region, and the National Guard was expected to deploy more than six dozen personnel and 20 vehicles throughout the region. New York State Police were expected to bring in additional personnel, as well as supply at least 50 4x4 vehicles, 8 all-terrain vehicles, and 8 snowmobiles. At its major transportation facilities, the Port Authority of New York and New Jersey readied more than 200 piece of snow equipment at its airports, more than 60 pieces of snow equipment for its bridges and tunnels, hundreds of thousands of gallons of liquid anti-icer chemicals and thousands of tons of solid de-icers, plow-equipped trains, liquid snow-melting agent trains, and a "jet engine" plow. The New York State Thruway Authority activated its emergency operations ahead of the winter storm and was expected to supply 338 snowplows, 18 snowblowers, 55 front-end loaders, and approximately 126,000 tons of salt. The New York State Department of Transportation also activated its emergency operations, mobilizing 162 snow plows and nearly 338 operators to Long Island and the Hudson Valley, totaling to approximately 600 plows and 1,300 operators and supervisors across downstate New York. A total of 1,444 snow plows and 3,629 operators and supervisors would be available statewide. New York City Mayor Bill de Blasio warned of 2 to 3 feet (0.61 to 0.91 m) of snow, and said, "Prepare for something worse than we have seen before." De Blasio ordered all vehicles off the streets by 11 pm on January 26, and declared that, with the exception of emergency and government vehicles, anyone driving in New York City after 11 pm on January 26 would be fined. Services on the New York City Subway, Long Island Rail Road, Metro-North Railroad, and Amtrak were also suspended.

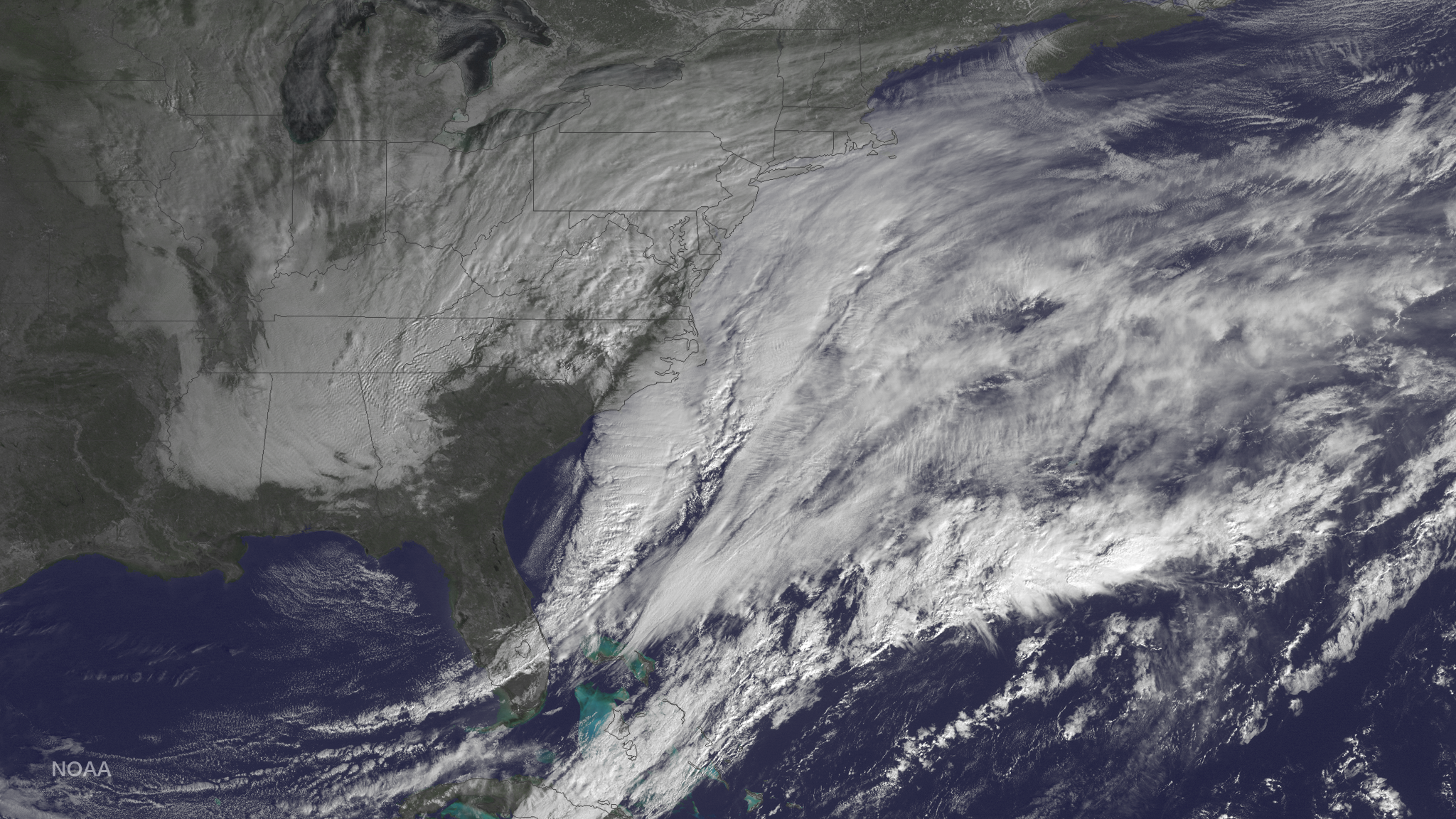
The blizzard developing off the Southeastern U.S. early on January 26

==== New England ====
===== Connecticut, Rhode Island, Massachusetts =====
Connecticut Governor Dannel Malloy announced in a press conference early on January 26 that Connecticut Transit services would be suspended and a statewide travel ban would be effective beginning at 9 p.m. EST; he also urged all residents to leave work early and shelter in their homes. The Metropolitan Transportation Authority announced that it would be adding additional trains to accommodate for those who travel by rail. The governor announced that more than 600 crews would be working to pre-treat major roads, while he issued a declaration of civil preparedness emergency to coordinate resources during the storm. Connecticut Light and Power and United Illuminating prepared for a "Level 1" emergency and summoned outside tree and line crews. Later that day, the governor declared a state of emergency. The travel ban was lifted for Fairfield and Litchfield Counties in western Connecticut at 8 a.m. on the 27th, and for the remainder of the state at 2 p.m. that afternoon.

Rhode Island Governor Gina Raimondo urged people to ensure that they had enough food, water, and fuel to last several days for what could be a "very severe and dangerous weather event". She asked residents to keep fire hydrants uncovered and asked that generators used for electricity were located outside of homes and in well-ventilated locations. On January 26, the governor declared a state of emergency and announced that a statewide travel ban would go into effect at midnight. National Grid gathered approximately 1,000 crews to help restore power after the storm passed.

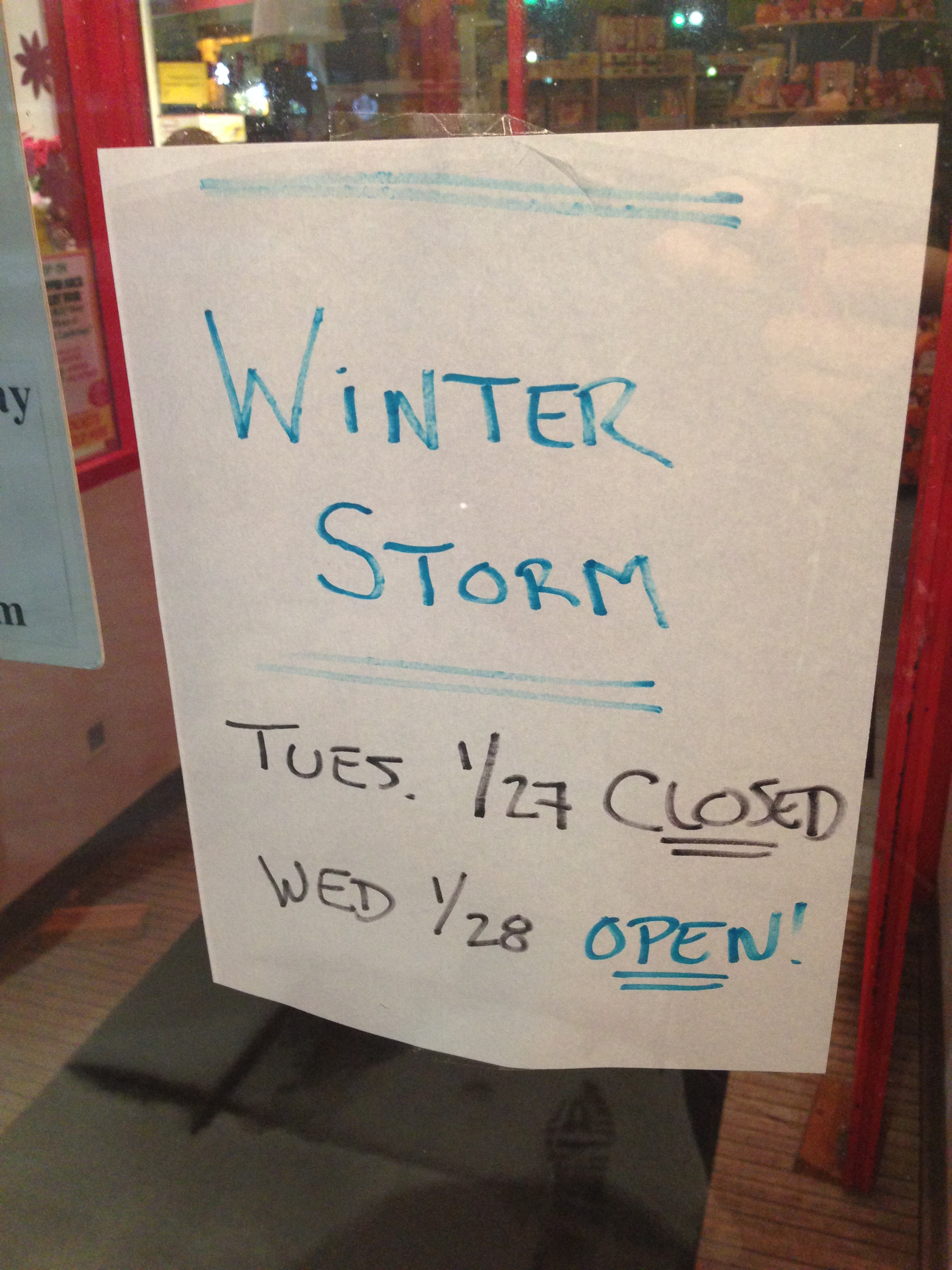
Harvard Square store closed in preparation for blizzard

Massachusetts Governor Charlie Baker declared a state of emergency and asked residents to remain safe and off roadways. A statewide travel ban was issued effective at midnight on January 27, and the Massachusetts Bay Transportation Authority announced that it would be closed that day. In Boston, up to 35,000 tons of salt were prepared and snow farms were readied to store the removed snow following the passage of the storm. Electric companies brought in extra crews. The Fall River, Massachusetts Department of Public Works gathered more than 800 tons of salt and began to treat major roadways in advance of the storm.

=== Atlantic Canada ===
Environment Canada issued special weather statements to all of the Maritime provinces on January 23, warning of the future developing storm. On January 26 Environment Canada issued Winter Storm Warnings for all of Nova Scotia, Prince Edward Island, and central to southern New Brunswick. These warnings were later upgraded to Blizzard Warnings. Between 6 and 20 inches (15 and 51 cm) of snow was forecast across the Maritimes. On January 27, snow started early in the morning in southwestern Nova Scotia and continued northeastward. A large wind gust of 80 mph (130 km/h) was measured in Baccaro Point, NS. Meanwhile, in Sluice Point there were gusts exceeding 70 mph (110 km/h) in the afternoon. In Moncton snow totaled near 11.8 inches (30 cm) the most out of all four provinces. The strong winds and blowing snow caused poor traveling conditions across Atlantic Canada.

== Impact ==
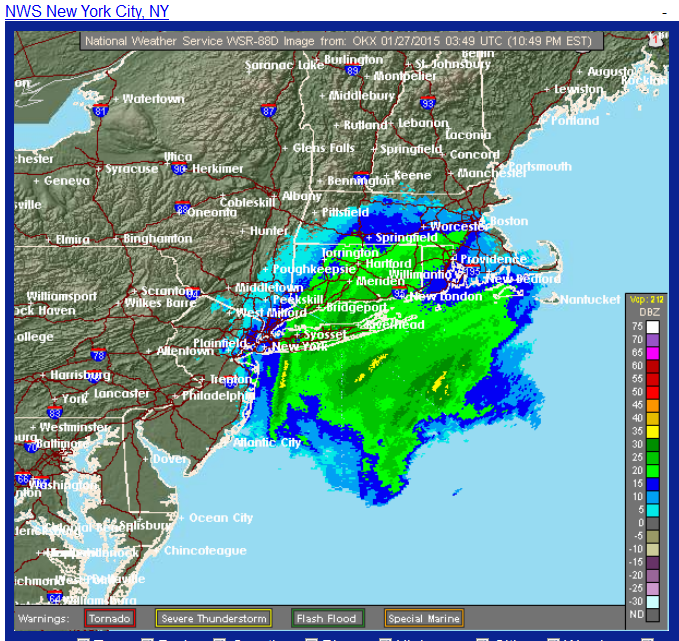
Radar image of the blizzard at 03:49 UTC on January 27

=== Northeastern United States ===
==== Mid-Atlantic states ====
FlightAware reported that 1,200 flights were expected to be cancelled on January 26. Delta pre-emptively cancelled 600 flights; furthermore, a dozen flights from London Heathrow to New York, Philadelphia and Boston were cancelled on the same date.

At least two deaths related to the nor'easter occurred on Long Island, New York. Sean Urda, a 17-year-old student from John Glenn High School, was killed when he struck a light pole while snow tubing with two other people in Huntington. An 83-year-old man with dementia was found dead in his backyard in Bay Shore.

The National Basketball Association postponed two games scheduled to take place on January 26, both in New York City. The game between the Portland Trail Blazers and the Brooklyn Nets was rescheduled for April 6, while the game between the Sacramento Kings and the Manhattan-based New York Knicks was rescheduled for March 3.

Snow from the storm fell as far south as parts of North Carolina, southern Virginia, Washington, D.C., and the Washington, D.C. metropolitan area, where trace amounts were reported beginning on January 26. Schools in some Virginia counties were closed due to the weather.

==== New England ====
===== Massachusetts and Rhode Island =====
A record-breaking 22.1 inches of snow fell in Boston on January 27.

WWE had events scheduled to take place in Hartford, Connecticut, and in Boston, Massachusetts, but had to cancel them, instead choosing to air Royal Rumble highlights.

Significant flooding was reported in Scituate, Massachusetts, where National Guardsmen were sent to rescue people from the high waters and power was cut to some areas of the town to prevent fires from breaking out. Elsewhere in the state, eighty feet of seawall in Marshfield was washed away by the storm, and a number of houses in the town were condemned. "Virtually all" utility customers lost power on the island of Nantucket and in Provincetown on Cape Cod during the storm.

A replica of the USS Providence, maintained by the Providence Maritime Heritage Foundation and designated in 1992 as the flagship and tall ship ambassador of the state of Rhode Island, was toppled and severely damaged by high winds during the storm while in drydock for the winter.

=== Gallery ===
Images of snowfall accumulated during the blizzard
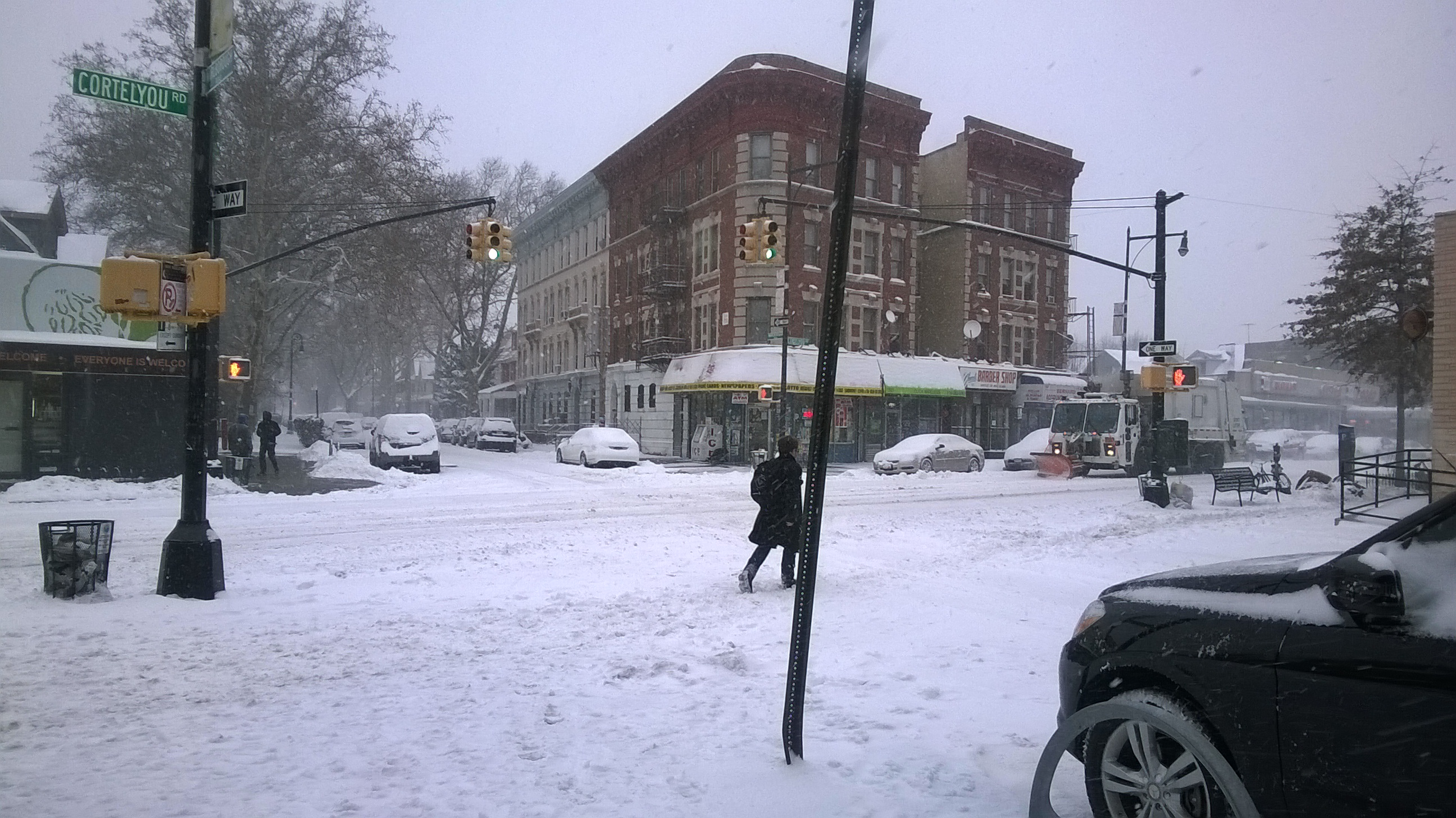
Snowfall in Brooklyn, New York on January 26

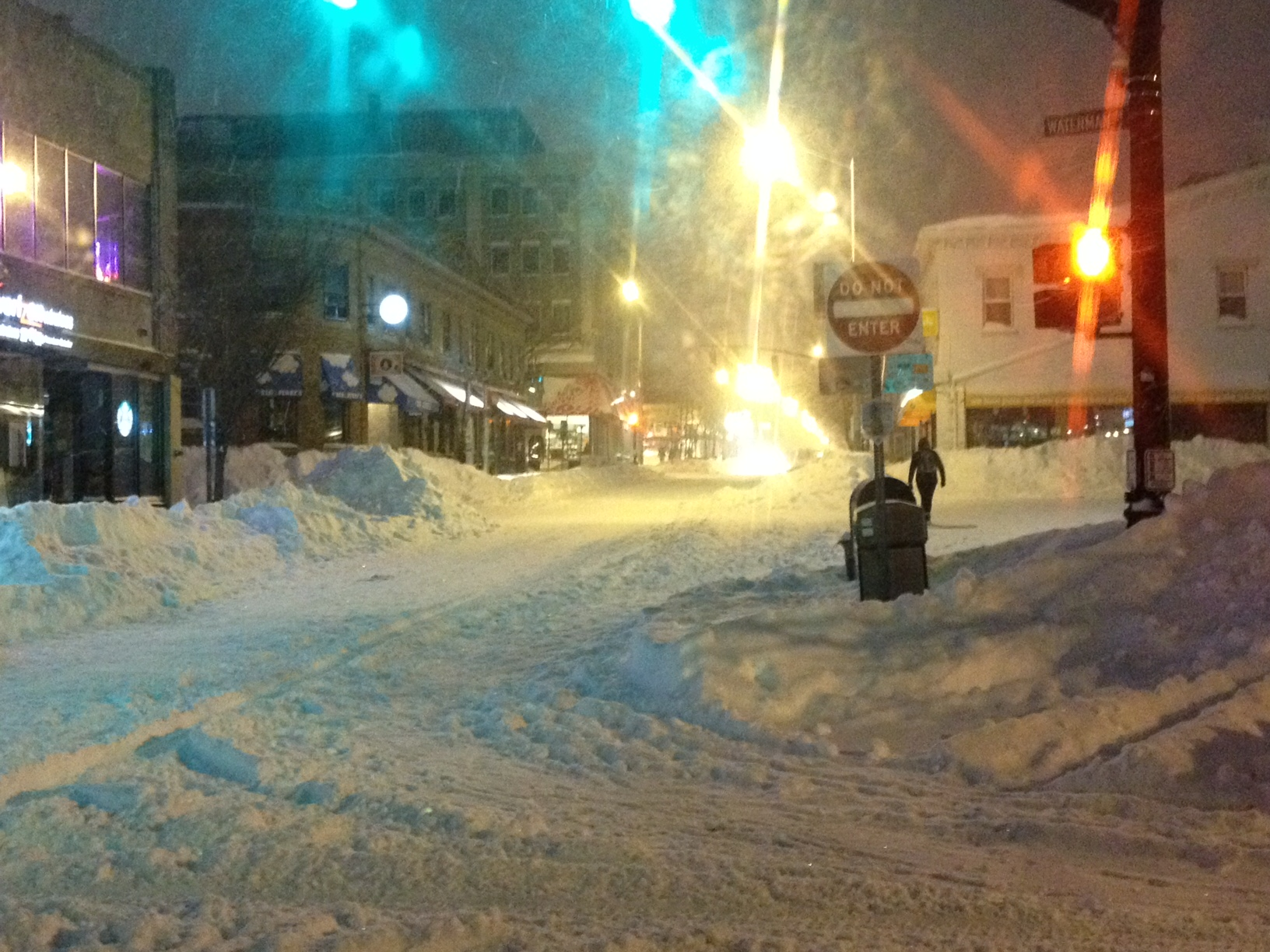
Snowfall in Providence, Rhode Island, on January 27

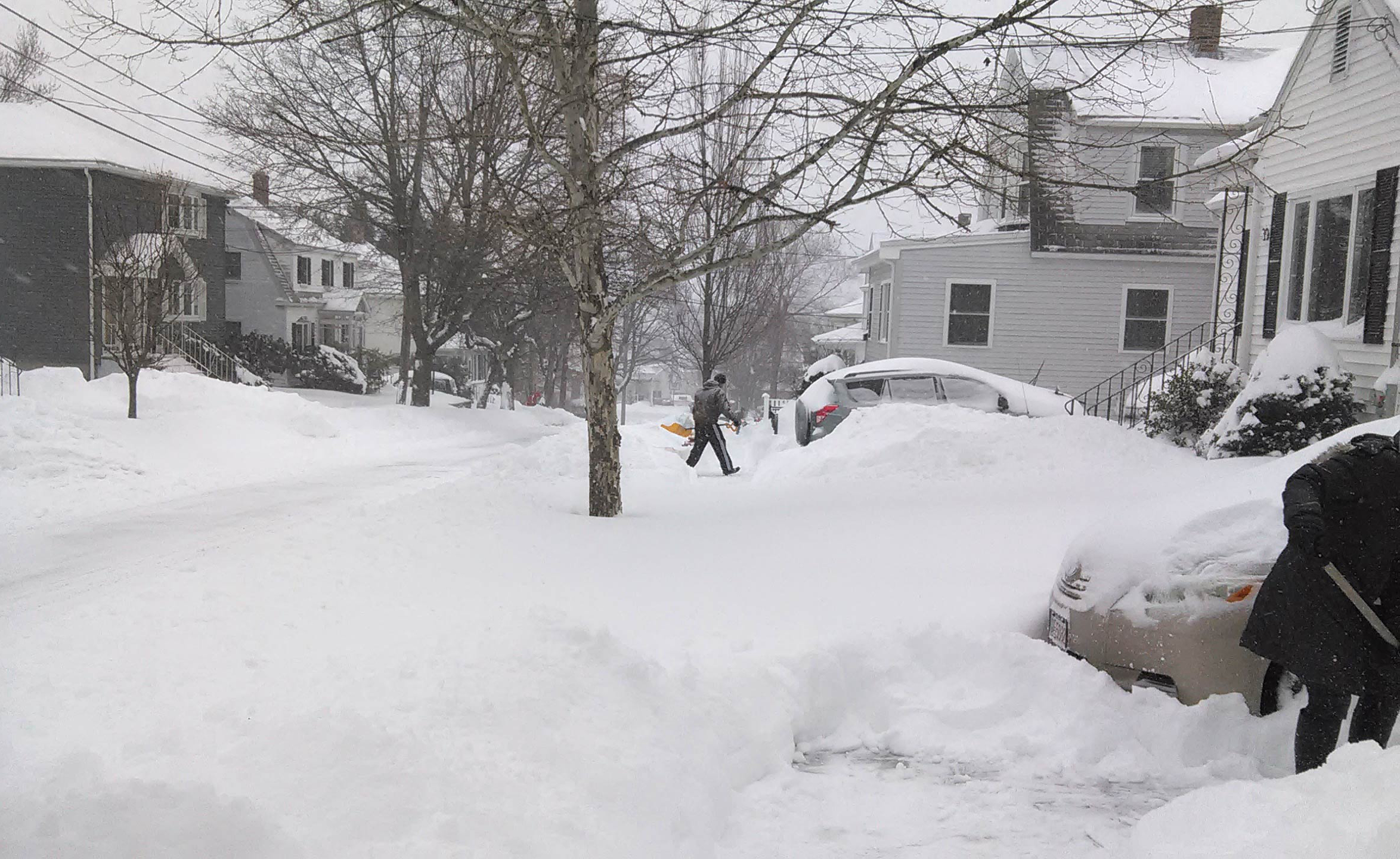
Snowfall in Watertown, Massachusetts, on January 27

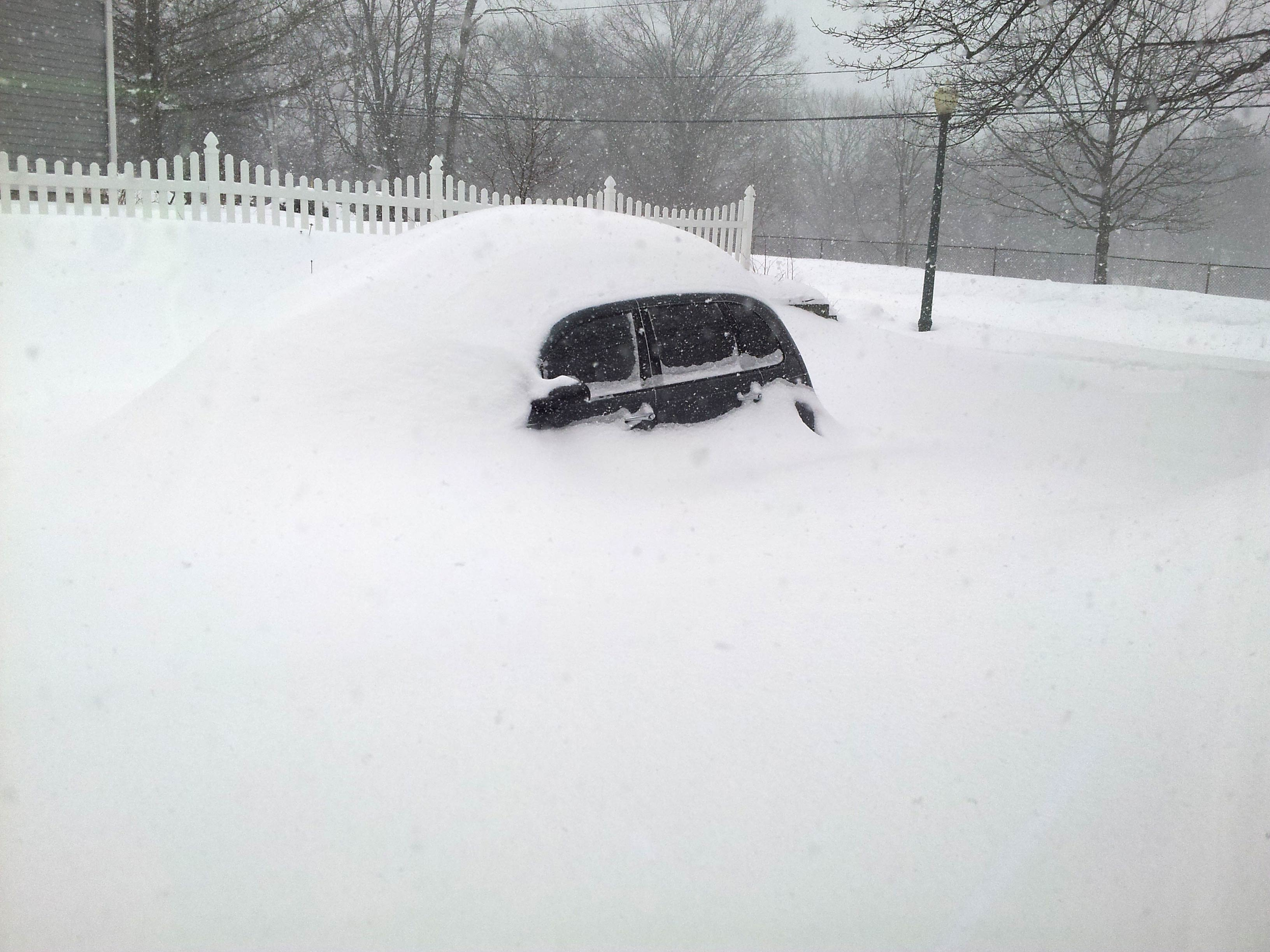
Snowfall at the Massachusetts-New Hampshire border before noon on January 27

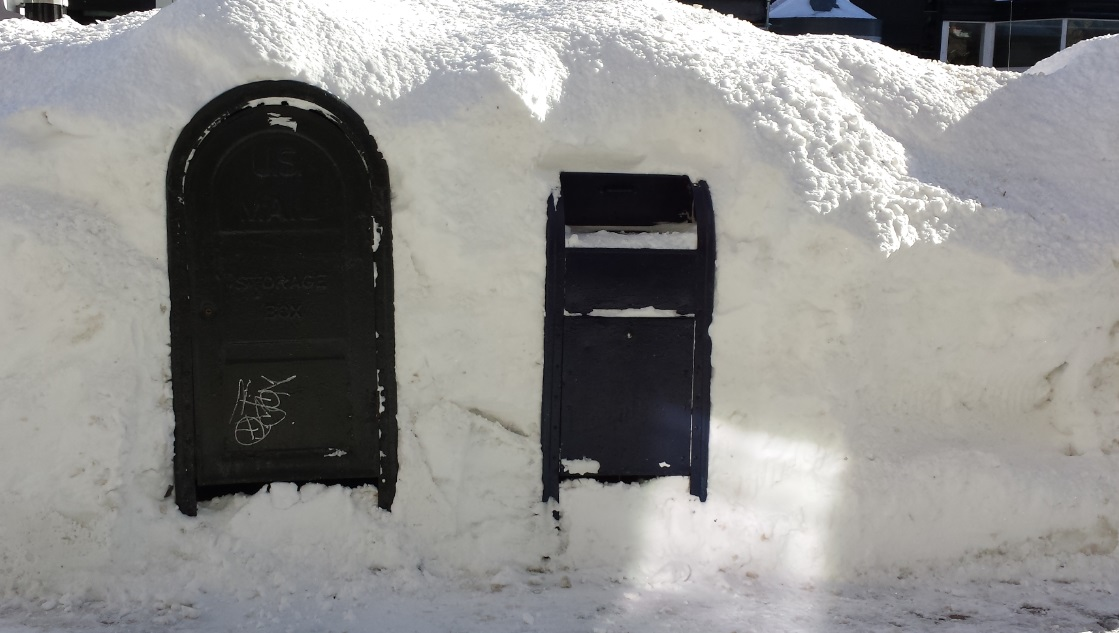
Snow covered mailboxes in Boston's Back Bay neighborhood after the January 2015 blizzard

=== Records ===
Up to 34.5 in (88 cm) of snow fell in Worcester, Massachusetts, marking the city's largest storm total accumulation on record. The Blue Hill Observatory in Massachusetts observed 30.8 in (78 cm), or the second-largest storm total accumulation on record, while both Providence, Rhode Island and Portland, Maine recorded their fourth-largest storm total accumulations on record, at 19.1 in (49 cm). Boston observed 24.6 in (62 cm) of snow, its largest January storm total accumulation and its sixth largest storm total accumulation on record.

=== Snowfall totals ===
The following is a list of storm totals above 24 inches (61 cm). Click "hide" to collapse table.

Amount	City/location	State
36.0 inches (91 cm)	Lunenburg	MA
36.0 inches (91 cm)	Auburn	MA
36.0 inches (91 cm)	Hudson	MA
36.0 inches (91 cm)	Milford	MA
36.0 inches (91 cm)	Oxford	MA
34.5 inches (88 cm)	Worcester	MA
34.4 inches (87 cm)	East Sandwich	MA
34.1 inches (87 cm)	Clinton	MA
34.1 inches (87 cm)	0.2 Miles North of Winthrop	CT
33.8 inches (86 cm)	Chelmsford	MA
33.5 inches (85 cm)	Thompson	CT
33.5 inches (85 cm)	West Boylston	MA
33.5 inches (85 cm)	Framingham	MA
33.2 inches (84 cm)	Nashua	NH
33.1 inches (84 cm)	Dracut	MA
33.0 inches (84 cm)	Acton	MA
32.8 inches (83 cm)	1.3 Miles Southwest of Acton	CT
32.5 inches (83 cm)	Brewster	MA
32.3 inches (82 cm)	0.6 Miles East of Southbridge	CT
32.0 inches (81 cm)	Hudson	NH
32.0 inches (81 cm)	Holden	MA
31.5 inches (80 cm)	West Harwich	MA
31.5 inches (80 cm)	Methuen	MA
31.5 inches (80 cm)	1.2 Miles Northeast of North Waterboro	ME
31.0 inches (79 cm)	South Boston	MA
31.0 inches (79 cm)	Sharon	MA
31.0 inches (79 cm)	Gloucester	MA
31.0 inches (79 cm)	Milford	MA
30.7 inches (78 cm)	Plymouth	MA
30.0 inches (76 cm)	Orient	NY
30.0 inches (76 cm)	Putnam	CT
29.0 inches (74 cm)	Southampton	NY
28.5 inches (72 cm)	Burrillville	RI
27.1 inches (69 cm)	Hyannis	MA
27.0 inches (69 cm)	Oak Bluffs	MA
26.9 inches (68 cm)	Mattituck	NY
26.2 inches (67 cm)	Shrewsbury	MA
26.0 inches (66 cm)	East Freetown	MA
25.6 inches (65 cm)	Medford	NY
25.6 inches (65 cm)	Tewksbury	MA
25.0 inches (64 cm)	Cumberland	ME
24.6 inches (62 cm)	1 Mile North of East Boston (Airport)	MA
24.5 inches (62 cm)	Quincy	MA
25.6 inches (65 cm)	West Gloucester	RI
24.1 inches (61 cm)	Fall River	MA
24.0 inches (61 cm)	Groton	CT
24.0 inches (61 cm)	West Babylon	NY
24.0 inches (61 cm)	Hanover	MA
24.0 inches (61 cm)	Marshfield	MA
24.0 inches (61 cm)	Wells	ME
24.0 inches (61 cm)	Auburn	NH

=== Disaster relief funds ===
In April 2015, President Obama made a federal disaster declaration for the January 26–27 snow, allowing some reimbursement for damages. Massachusetts distributed an extra $30 million to cities and towns for repairs from the winter overall.

== See also ==
- North American blizzard of 2003 – A crippling blizzard that struck the Mid-Atlantic and Northeast in February 2003
- North American blizzard of 2006 – A blizzard that delivered a record-breaking snowfall total of 26.9 in (68 cm) to New York City
- December 2010 North American blizzard
- February 2013 North American blizzard – A significant winter storm that affected the Northeastern United States in February 2013
- January 2016 United States blizzard
