= January 4–8, 2017 North American winter storm =

North American winter storm

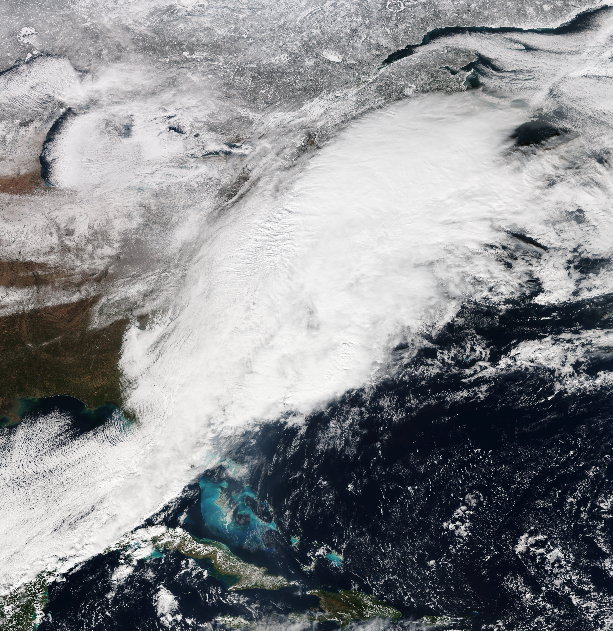
- The winter storm intensifying off the East Coast of the United States on January 7

Meteorological history
- Formed: January 4, 2017
- Dissipated: January 13, 2017

Category 2 "Minor" winter storm
- Regional snowfall index: 3.50 (NOAA)
- Lowest pressure: 987 mbar (hPa); 29.15 inHg
- Max. snowfall: 56 inches (140 cm) at Boreal and Soda Springs, California

Overall effects
- Fatalities: 6
- Areas affected: Western United States, Northeast (Mid-Atlantic, New England), Southeast (especially Mississippi, Alabama, Georgia, South Carolina, North Carolina and Virginia), Canada (Nova Scotia), Southern Greenland, Iceland
- Power outages: 35,000+
- Part of the 2016–17 North American winter

The January 4–8, 2017 North American winter storm was a major snow and ice storm that affected the Lower 48 of the United States with winter weather. Moving ashore on the West Coast on January 3, the system produced heavy snowfall in the Sierra Mountains, with nearly 4 feet of snowfall falling in the highest elevations. After impacting the Northwest and Southwest, the winter storm went on to strike the Southeast on January 5–6 with snow and ice, with snowfall accumulations up to 4 inches (10 cm). Afterwards, it began to morph into a nor'easter as it moved off the Southeast coast late on January 6, while producing blizzard conditions in the Carolinas. It then began to affect the Northeastern United States as it tracked northwards early on January 7. It produced a swath of moderate snowfall accumulations up the East Coast, with easternmost areas such as parts of Massachusetts receiving up to 1.5 feet (18 in) of snow.

Fearful of another disaster reminiscent of that from late January 2014, residents of states such as Louisiana, Mississippi, Alabama, and Georgia prepared in advance for the storm. Multiple advisories were issued in advance for winter weather in the affected areas. The storm caused nearly 35,000 or more power outages in the south, with at least six fatalities confirmed.

== Meteorological history ==
On January 4 around 00:00 UTC, an area of low pressure associated with an atmospheric river moved onshore on the West Coast of the United States. With cold air in place, heavy snow began to fall in parts of Montana, Oregon, and in the Sierra Mountains, with maximum accumulations of nearly 4 feet. As it dived southeastwards, the low dissipated because of interaction with the mountains of areas such as Arizona, New Mexico, and Nevada. However, leftover energy from the dissipating system continued to move south towards the Southeast.

At the same time, a stationary front formed within the northeastern part of the Gulf of Mexico, and once this energy reached the front with cold air in place, snow, sleet, and ice began to break out in areas such as Louisiana, Mississippi, Arkansas, and Alabama as a new area of low pressure formed along the stationary front late on January 5. The aforementioned low then quickly moved onshore and continued to produce more wintry precipitation, as it tracked eastwards throughout the day on January 6. By 06:00 UTC on January 7, a new low developed just offshore the South Carolina coastline, and this low eventually became the dormant low as the system tracked offshore.

The winter storm then began to intensify as it began tracking north-northeast, hugging the East Coast of the United States, while transitioning into a nor'easter. As it did so, snowfall began to spread all into parts of the Northeast, including New Jersey, New York, and Connecticut during the course of January 7. Further deepening of the winter storm occurred as snowfall began to end in parts of New England, and by 15:00 UTC on January 8, the cyclone had finally moved away from the coastline as an arctic airmass of high pressure began to settle in behind the storm. For the next two days, the storm system moved through Atlantic Canada and Southern Greenland, before being absorbed by a frontal system, forming to the west of Iceland on January 13.

== Preparations and impact ==
=== Southeast ===
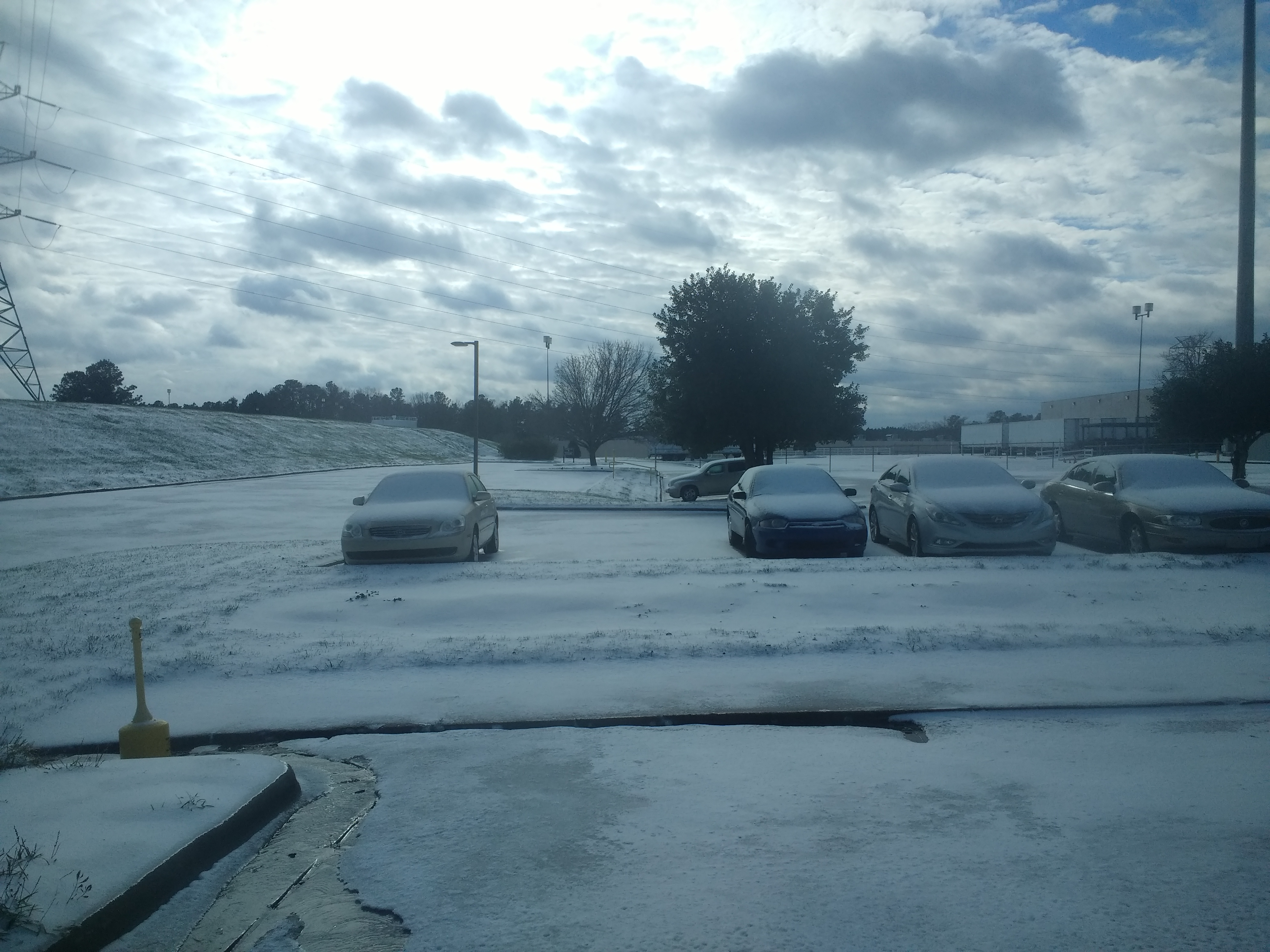
Snow in central North Carolina brought by the storm

On January 6, 2017, North Carolina Governor Roy Cooper declared a state of emergency. 10 inches of snow fell in Greensboro, High Point, Lewisville and Lenoir, and at one point 25,000 were without power. 700 traffic accidents were reported.

The winter storm laid a thin layer of ice across parts of the state of Mississippi, causing multiple road closures. Portions of Interstate 20 and Interstate 55 were also closed because of the ice, as multiple bridges and overpasses had ice on them. 62 accidents were reported, but there were no injuries reported from the Magnolia State.

In Alabama, governor Robert J. Bentley declared a state of emergency on January 5, in advance of the storm, deploying 300 soldiers of the Alabama National Guard for assistance. Roads were closed in Alabama as the winter storm moved through, with officials urging residents to stay inside. Multiple portions of interstates were closed, with the climax being Interstate 59 becoming impassable early on January 8. Curfews were also put in place as conditions deteriorated quickly, advising travel would not be a good idea.

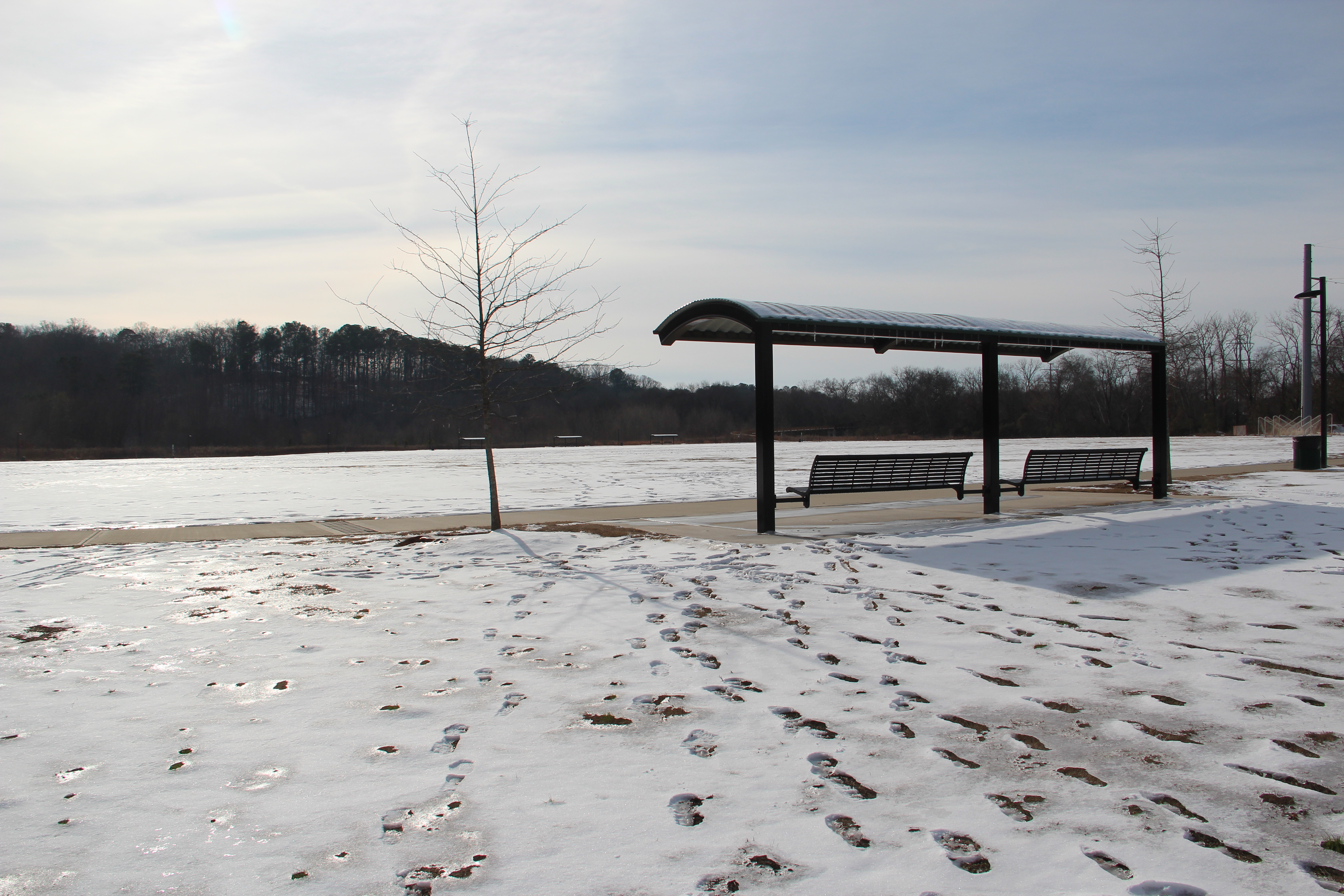
Snow in Canton, Georgia

Early on January 7, travel was nearly impassable in the northern portion of Georgia, with 10,000 customers reporting power outages. 700 flights were cancelled at the Hartsfield-Jackson International Airport on January 6–7. Multiple cars were also reported to have slid off roads because of the treacherous conditions.

In Tennessee, a school bus was reported to have slid off the road early on January 7 as the storm caused impacts. No injuries were reported. Schools were also let out earlier because of the deteriorating conditions. By 9:30 a.m, there was about 53 reported crashes.

At least four people died in traffic accidents in Arkansas as the system moved through. In response to slick roads caused by the storm, numerous schools closed. On January 6, governmental offices were closed, including all state nonessential offices. A speech Arkansas Governor Asa Hutchinson was scheduled to give to the Northeast Arkansas Political Animals was canceled.

In Kentucky, a fatal crash was reported early on January 5 after a man's car struck a tree after sliding on the slippery roads. He died after being rushed to the hospital.

An EF0 tornado touched down near Live Oak, Florida causing roof damage and fallen trees and tree limbs.

=== Mid-Atlantic and Northeast ===
A blizzard warning was issued on January 5 for the eastern coast of the state of Virginia, an extremely rare event. The heaviest accumulations of the storm reached 13 inches (33 cm). Slick roads lead to nearly 500 crashes, one of which claimed a life. On January 7, the stretch of roads from Interstate 664 to Interstate 64 in Hampton, was closed because of heavy snowfall, as well as every flight being cancelled at the Norfolk International Airport. The Port of Virginia was also closed at midnight on January 7 because of the possibility of white-out conditions. Vessels were prohibited from entering or leaving, and remaining ones were advised to stay docked.

On January 6, a winter storm warning was issued for parts of New Jersey, as the system was expected to brush the coastline with the heaviest accumulations to the southeast. However, the snowfall totals were later upgraded to be shifted more west as the low was expected to track more to the west then originally thought. A winter weather advisory was also issued for the western parts of New Jersey; however, some of these areas were later included to the warning. Most of the major roads in the state, such as the Garden State Parkway and the New Jersey Turnpike had their speed limits reduced because of the snowfall, although residents were advised across the state to stay inside.

In Delaware, where as much as nearly a foot of snow fell and winds of up to 35 mph (56 km/h), drivers faced extremely poor visibility, which caused dozens of cars to spin out during the day on roadways. As the snowfall ended, Delaware Department Transportation spokesman Jim Westhoff released a statement stating "We've got to get the roads in pretty good shape before that Monday morning.", because of the risk of slippery roads. Governor Jack Markell issued a limited state of emergency for the county of Sussex, advising residents to stay off the roads. In other areas such as Claymont, a car collided with a snowplow early on January 6. In total, roughly 94 crashes and 23 disabled vehicles were responded to by the Delaware State Police.

In New York, as much as 6 inches (15 cm) of snowfall fell in parts of the state, with New York City picking up their first measurable snow of the season.

=== New England ===
A multi-car collision was reported on January 7 along a snow-covered portion of Interstate 91 near Middletown, Connecticut. No injuries or fatalities were reported; however, it gave authorities to warn residents about traveling on treacherous roads. It also resulted in the road being shut down near the crash for over five hours.

At Boston Logan International Airport in Massachusetts, the location picked up 7.2 inches (18 cm), their heaviest snowfall since a blizzard about two years prior, which dropped nearly 16 inches (41 cm) on parts of the city. A total of 179 cancellations were made at the airport on January 6–7. Officials also warned residents to stay off the roadways of Cape Cod, with whiteout conditions being cited as the likely cause. Governor Charlie Baker had reported that minor crashes were reported in and around the state, none of which were injurious or fatal. He also stated that 3,000 snow plows or other equipment had been dispatched to clear off the major highways for travel.

In Maine, the stretch of the Maine Turnpike (I-95) from the New Hampshire state line to exit 53 had the speed limits reduced to 45 mph (72 km/h).

=== Central United States ===
Frontier Airlines, centered in Denver, canceled roughly two dozen flights in advance of the storm's arrival. Ski lifts were shut down at Steamboat Springs, Colorado, and an Avalanche Warning was issued for the Gunnison area.

Between two and three inches of snow fell across the state of Oklahoma, with higher totals occurring in the Panhandle and locally. Oktaha, in the eastern part of the state, measured five inches. Some highways closed while state crews treated them and dealt with accidents. Dozens of accidents were reported by the Oklahoma City Fire Department, with nine of them involving injuries, and many schools canceled classes in the Oklahoma City metropolitan area.

== See also ==
- Weather of 2017
- January 2014 Gulf Coast winter storm
- Mid-February 2014 North American winter storm – Very similar storm that produced nearly the same conditions in the same areas
- Mid-January 2017 North American ice storm
- February 5–6, 2010 North American blizzard
