= February 15–20, 2021 North American winter storm =

Category 3 winter storm and ice storm in the United States

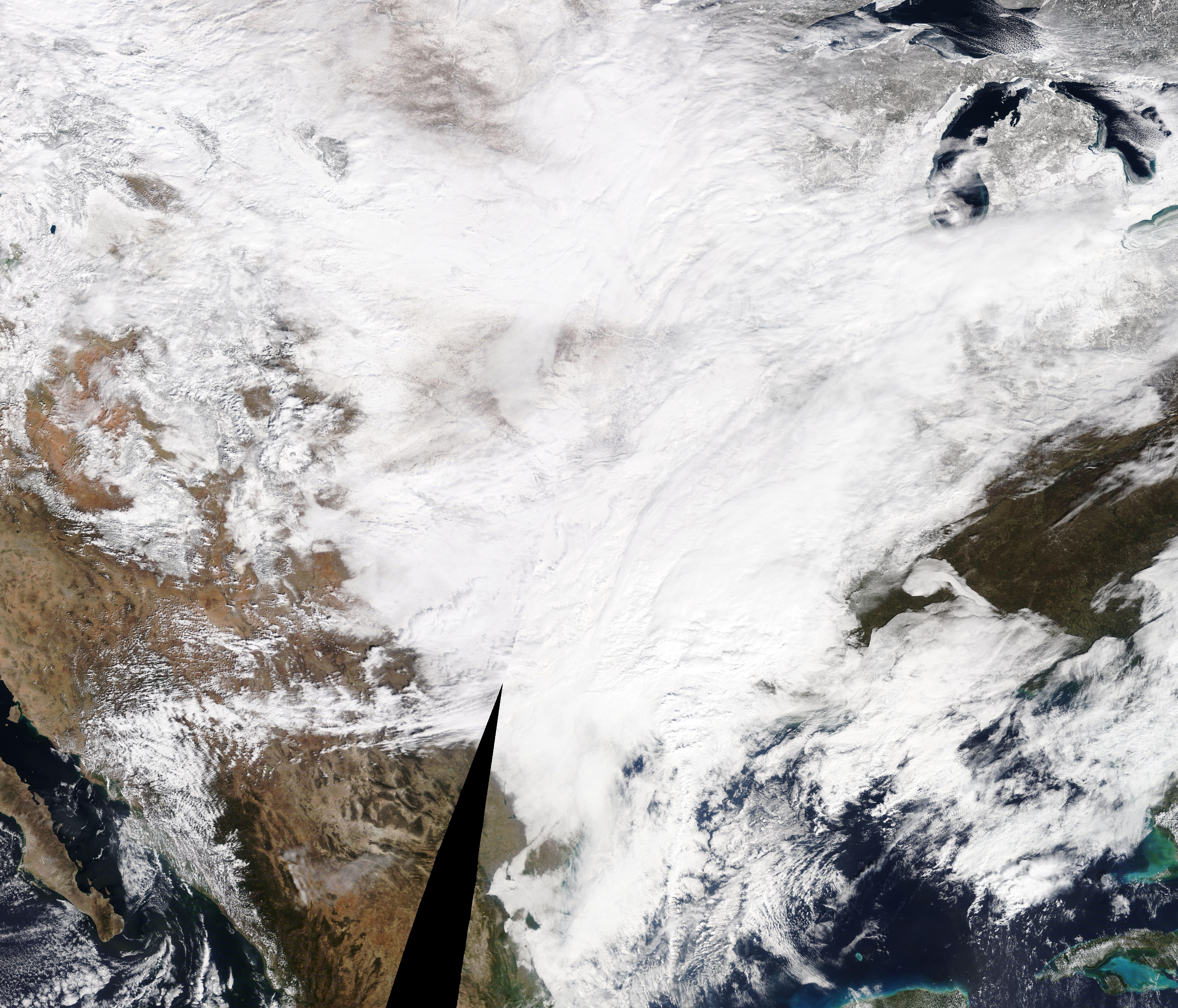
- Satellite imagery of the winter storm impacting the Southern United States on February 17

Meteorological history
- Formed: February 14, 2021
- Exited land: February 20, 2021
- Dissipated: February 26, 2021

Category 3 "Major" winter storm
- Regional snowfall index: 7.50 (NOAA)
- Highest winds: 90 mph (150 km/h) (1-minute sustained winds)
- Lowest pressure: 948 mbar (hPa); 27.99 inHg
- Maximum snowfall or ice accretion: Snow – 24 in (61 cm) at Skamania, Washington; Ice – 0.7 in (18 mm) at Harrisonburg, Louisiana

Overall effects
- Fatalities: At least 29 fatalities
- Damage: > $2 billion (2021 USD)
- Areas affected: Western United States, Southern Plains, Deep South, Northeastern United States, Atlantic Canada, British Isles, Iceland, Faroe Islands
- Power outages: > 4 million
- Part of the 2020–21 North American winter

From February 15–20, 2021, a significant and widespread winter storm, also unofficially referred to as Winter Storm Viola by the Weather Channel, or to some as simply The North Texas Freeze, caused major impacts and additional damage across much of the United States, Northern Mexico, and Southern Canada, and worsening conditions already significantly hampered by another destructive winter storm several days prior. The system started out as a winter storm on the West Coast of the United States on February 15, later moving southeast into the Southern Plains and Deep South from February 16–17. It then moved into the Appalachian Mountains and Northeastern United States, before finally moving out to sea on February 20. The storm subsequently became a powerful low pressure system over the North Atlantic, before eventually dissipating on February 26.

The system resulted in over 170 million people being placed under winter weather alerts, stretching from the West Coast to the East Coast. Over 4 million people lost power due to the storm, particularly in areas of the Deep South and interior Southeast. The system worsened the 2021 Texas power crisis, causing additional major damage to the Texas power grid just days after the previous storm came through the area and hampering recovery efforts. It also contributed to a historic cold wave that affected most of the Central United States. In total, the winter storm resulted in at least 29 fatalities, with 23 in the United States and six in Mexico. The system is estimated to have caused at least $2 billion (2021 USD) in damages, mainly due to blackouts and structural damage. Excluding the winter storm a few days previous to this storm, the system was the costliest winter storm in the United States since the March 1–3, 2018 nor'easter, and the deadliest since the Blizzard of 2016.

== Meteorological history ==
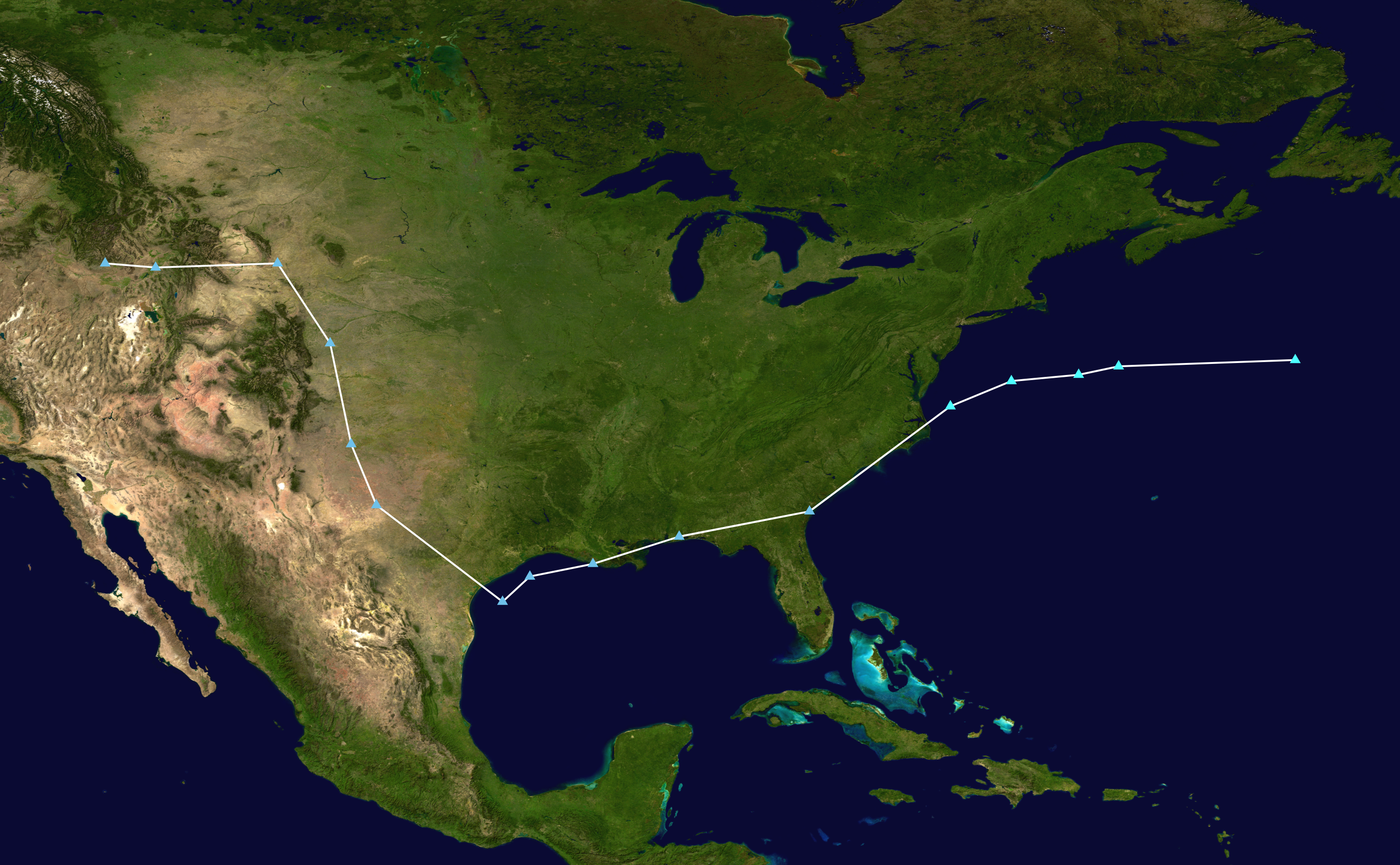
Map plotting the storm's track and intensity, according to the Saffir–Simpson scale Map key Saffir–Simpson scale Tropical depression (≤38 mph, ≤62 km/h) Tropical storm (39–73 mph, 63–118 km/h) Category 1 (74–95 mph, 119–153 km/h) Category 2 (96–110 mph, 154–177 km/h) Category 3 (111–129 mph, 178–208 km/h) Category 4 (130–156 mph, 209–251 km/h) Category 5 (≥157 mph, ≥252 km/h) Unknown Storm type Tropical cyclone Subtropical cyclone Extratropical cyclone, remnant low, tropical disturbance, or monsoon depression

On February 15, a weakening extratropical cyclone in the Pacific Ocean began moving ashore in the Pacific Northwest, with the frontal system having a minimum central pressure of 1,001 mb (29.6 inHg). Precipitation bands began developing with the system in portions of the Pacific Northwest, as well as the Rocky Mountains by 21:00 UTC that day. The frontal system then pushed eastward, and by 18:00 UTC on February 16, the system was crossing the Rocky Mountains, and fronts connected several low-pressures areas associated with the storm from north to south. Simultaneously, the main center of low pressure spawned several other low-pressure areas, while the storm began organizing. On February 17, the system developed a new low off the coast of Texas. A combination of a large trough in place over the Central United States, a large polar airmass being channeled southward, and moisture from the Gulf of Mexico caused snow and freezing rain to fall over the Southern States. For the next couple of days, the storm moved eastward while becoming elongated, before moving off the East Coast of the U.S. on February 19. However, the storm stalled off the East Coast of the U.S. for another day, bringing additional precipitation to the region, before finally beginning to move out to sea on February 20.

The storm organized significantly and strengthened as it moved out into the Atlantic, with the storm's central pressure reaching 990 millibars (29 inHg) at 09:00 UTC on February 20. Afterward, the storm underwent explosive intensification, with the storm's central pressure dropping from 995 millibars (29.4 inHg) to a peak intensity of 948 millibars (28.0 inHg) from February 21 to 22, as the storm moved eastward across the North Atlantic. On February 22, the Free University of Berlin also gave the storm the name Dieter. Then, the cyclone gradually began to weaken, with the storm spawning a new low-pressure system to the northeast on February 24. Over the next couple of days, the storm rapidly weakened as it accelerated towards the northeast, before dissipating on February 26.

== Preparations and impact ==
All warnings and advisories issued in the Central and Eastern United States due to the storm
Winter Storm Warning
Winter Storm Watch
Winter Weather Advisory

=== United States ===
Winter weather alerts were issued from February 14–15 in the Western United States, with Ice Storm Warnings being issued in portions of Oregon, due to a significant freezing rain threat, and Winter Storm Warnings were also issued in some of the mountainous regions. On February 16, Winter Storm Warnings were expanded into much of the Southern Plains and Deep South, and Winter Storm Watches were issued in parts of Mid-Atlantic and the Northeastern United States. On the next day, Winter Storm Watches in parts of the Northeast were upgraded to Winter Storm Warnings. In the entirety of the storm, over 170 million people were placed under some sort of winter weather alert, including over 120 million people under Winter or Ice Storm Warnings. In total, the storm left over 4 million people without power, making it one of the worst blackout events in the United States. In total, it killed at least 23 people in the United States, most of whom were in Texas.

==== Pacific Northwest ====
The system was the third winter storm to impact the Pacific Northwest with wintry weather in a week. Several inches of snow fell in Seattle, Washington, adding on to the totals from the previous storms. Further east in the mountain ranges, even higher totals were reported, with up to 2 feet (0.61 m) falling in some areas. On February 15, I-90 was closed in both directions in Snoqualmie Pass due to heavy snow. Further south in Oregon, heavy freezing rain occurred from February 15–16, resulting in widespread impacts. Portland, Oregon recorded over half an inch of ice from the system, and some areas to the east reported even more. Over 730,000 people were left without power in Oregon, with over 200,000 in the Portland area alone. Some customers remained without power for over a week.

==== Southern Plains and Deep South ====
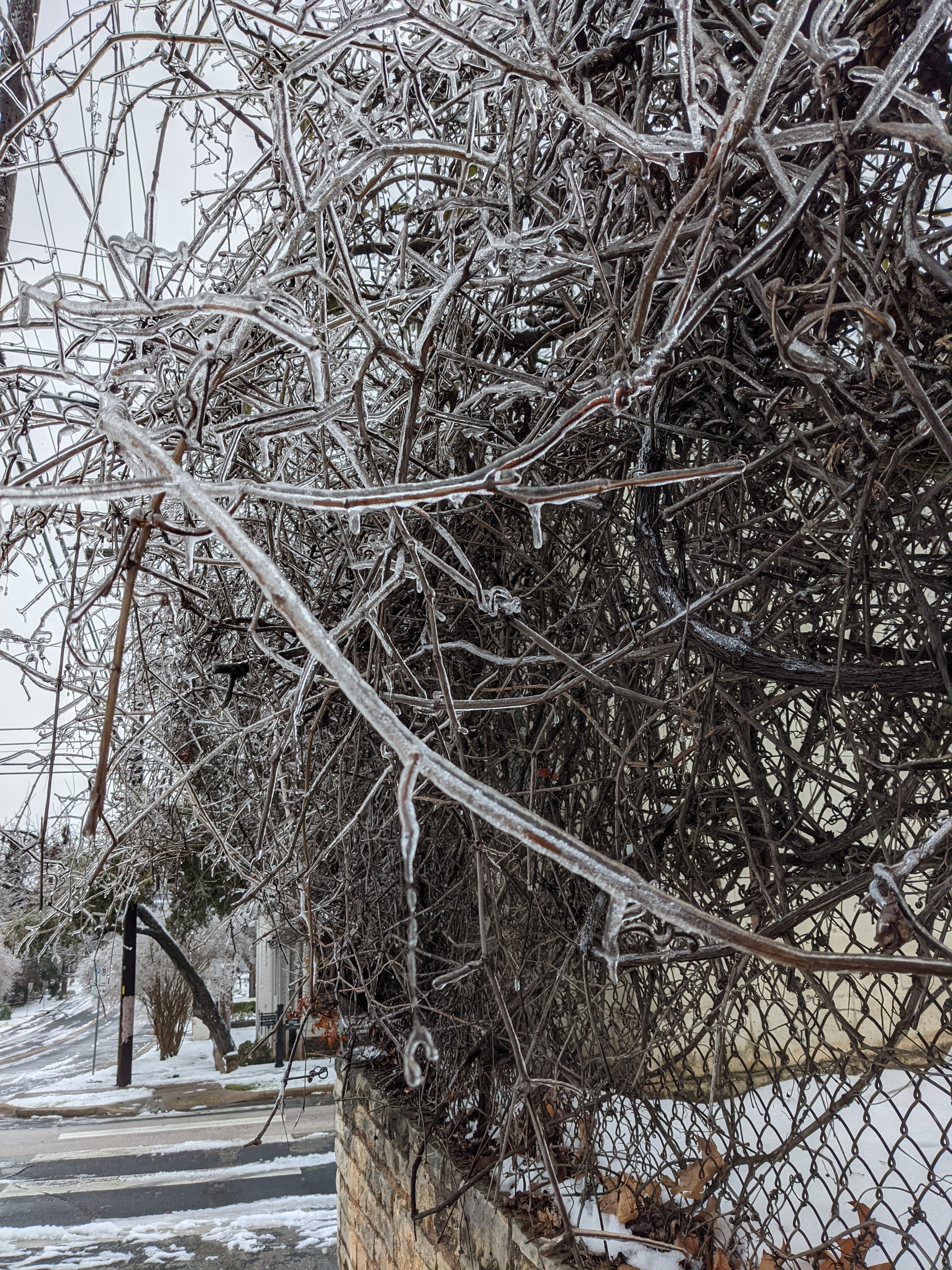
Ice accretion coating vegetation in Austin, Texas during the storm

Due to the storm, Oklahoma City saw 4 inches (10 cm) of snow, Tulsa, Oklahoma picked up 5 inches (13 cm), and Dallas saw 1 inch (2.5 cm). Eastern Texas and much of Louisiana also saw over 0.5 inches (13 mm) of freezing rain accretion. Both the Houston and San Antonio metro areas saw up to 0.1–0.25 inches (2.5–6.4 mm) of ice from the storm. Freezing rain was observed falling in Corpus Christi and Laredo as well. The freezing rain and snow from the system resulted in numerous structural collapses across parts of the Deep South. Also, much of northern Texas and southern Oklahoma picked up over 6 inches (15 cm) of snow, with one location in southern Oklahoma reporting 17 inches (43 cm) of snow depth after the storm. Much of southwestern Arkansas also saw over 10 inches (25 cm) of snow. In Little Rock, 11.8 inches (30 cm) of snow fell, bringing the snow depth up to a record 15 inches (38 cm). Further south, 14 inches (36 cm) of snow fell, with snow depths of over 20 inches (51 cm) after the storm. A band of heavy snow set up on the back edge of the storm in southeastern Texas, with Del Rio picking up 9.7 inches (25 cm) of snow, breaking the 24-hour snowfall record there, which had not been broken since 1985.

Over 2.6 million people were left without power across the Deep South during the storm, adding to damage caused by the previous winter storm. In an animal sanctuary in San Antonio, over a dozen animals died during the storm. The deaths were blamed to heavy snow and extreme cold due to the winter storm. Several states in the Deep South cancelled COVID-19 vaccination shipments. In northwest Louisiana, major highways such as I-20 had to be closed due to heavy snow and ice from the storm. Five people were killed in Houston alone due to the wintry weather. Hundreds of thousands of people in Texas and bordering states were placed under boil water advisories during and right after the storm. Hundreds of crashes occurred on roadways across the region, with injuries and fatalities occurring as well. In Mississippi, lack of snow removal equipment resulted in snow and ice coating roadways for days after the storm. In Dallas, two ice hockey games between the Stars and the Tampa Bay Lightning scheduled for February 18 and 20 were postponed, due to the recent winter storms. The NBA also postponed a game in Houston between the Rockets and the Indiana Pacers.

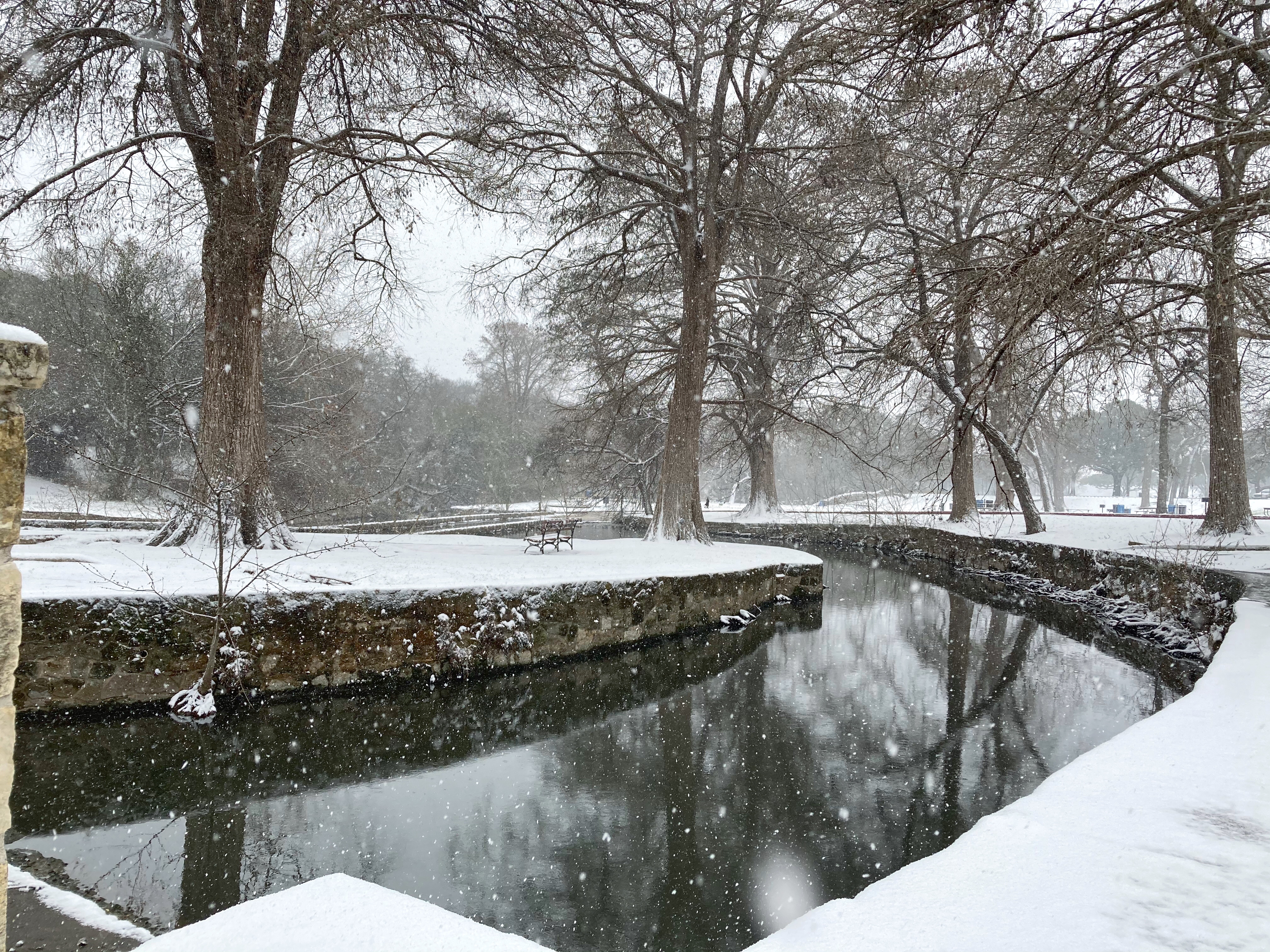
Snow falling in Brackenridge Park in San Antonio on February 18

In Texas, the storm resulted in burst water pipes due to freezing rain, magnifying the damage from the previous winter storm. Further east, several businesses were forced to close in many locations, including Walmart, Publix, CVS, and Walgreens. Postal delivery services, such as UPS and FedEx, were also severely impacted, due to the major winter storm. In Texas, the National Weather Service office in Austin/San Antonio described the snow and ice from the system as the "worst of all winter events over the past week". The Texas government opened 300 warming shelters across the state during the winter storm. In Arkansas, over 1 foot (0.30 m) of snow caused major travel disruption, including many crashes. The heavy snowfall also broke several all-time records in the area, which had not been broken in decades. Despite Arkansas having more snowplows than states to the south, the snow removal vehicles were still unable to keep up with the heavy snowfall rates. The Arkansas Department of Transportation reported that nearly all of the state's roads were snow-covered at the peak of the storm. However, no traffic-related fatalities were reported, although injuries did occur. The government also put into effect rolling power outages after the storm.

Sea turtles being rescued at Texas State Aquarium. Thousands of sea turtles were rescued during the storm.

In Jackson, Mississippi, freezing rain and sleet coated the roadways with ice, and numerous crashes resulted. It also left several drivers stranded for over 12 hours on the side of the roadways, before help arrived. In Louisiana, hundreds of car crashes occurred during the storm, with over 150,000 power outages being reported as well. Also, burst pipes became an issue due to freezing rain during the storm. Mississippi reported over 1,000 traffic accidents due to the system, and the governor reported that nearly the entire state faced issues due to the wintry weather. In northwestern Alabama, heavy snow and freezing rain resulted in roads becoming impassable. Several towns in the area were cut off from the big cities for over 2 days. In Florence, over 100 cars became stuck in a large pileup during the storm. Some of the snowfall and cold due to the storm rivaled similar occurrences during a similar wintry blast in 1989.

On February 18, the San Antonio Water System (SAWS) issue a boil-water notice for San Antonio, due to the power outages in Texas. On the same day, San Antonio firefighters fighting a large apartment fire caused by a water heater explosion were forced to use water trucks, as fire hydrants had become inoperable, due to water shortages. On February 18, the Oklahoma Department of Environmental Quality also issued boil-water recommendations for residents who experienced water service outages from the bitter temperatures and snowpack; Oklahoma City, Tulsa, and other cities (including Shawnee, Blackwell and Spencer) and rural water districts in the state issued temporary residential boil-water advisories or mandatory boil orders between February 18 and February 20.

In Kentucky, a man died after slipping on ice and then succumbing to hypothermia. In Memphis, Tennessee, the city declared a state of emergency on February 17, after the city saw a record daily snowfall accumulation of 7.2 inches (18 cm), bringing the total snowfall since February 15 to 10–12 inches (25–30 cm). The heavy snowfall disrupted FedEx operations at Memphis International Airport as the airport was closed for the entire day. The airport closure hampered COVID-19 vaccine distribution nationally. On February 18, Memphis's public utility MLGW issued its first ever boil water order as water pressure levels dropped, affecting 260,000 households. The boil water order was lifted on February 25.

==== Eastern United States ====
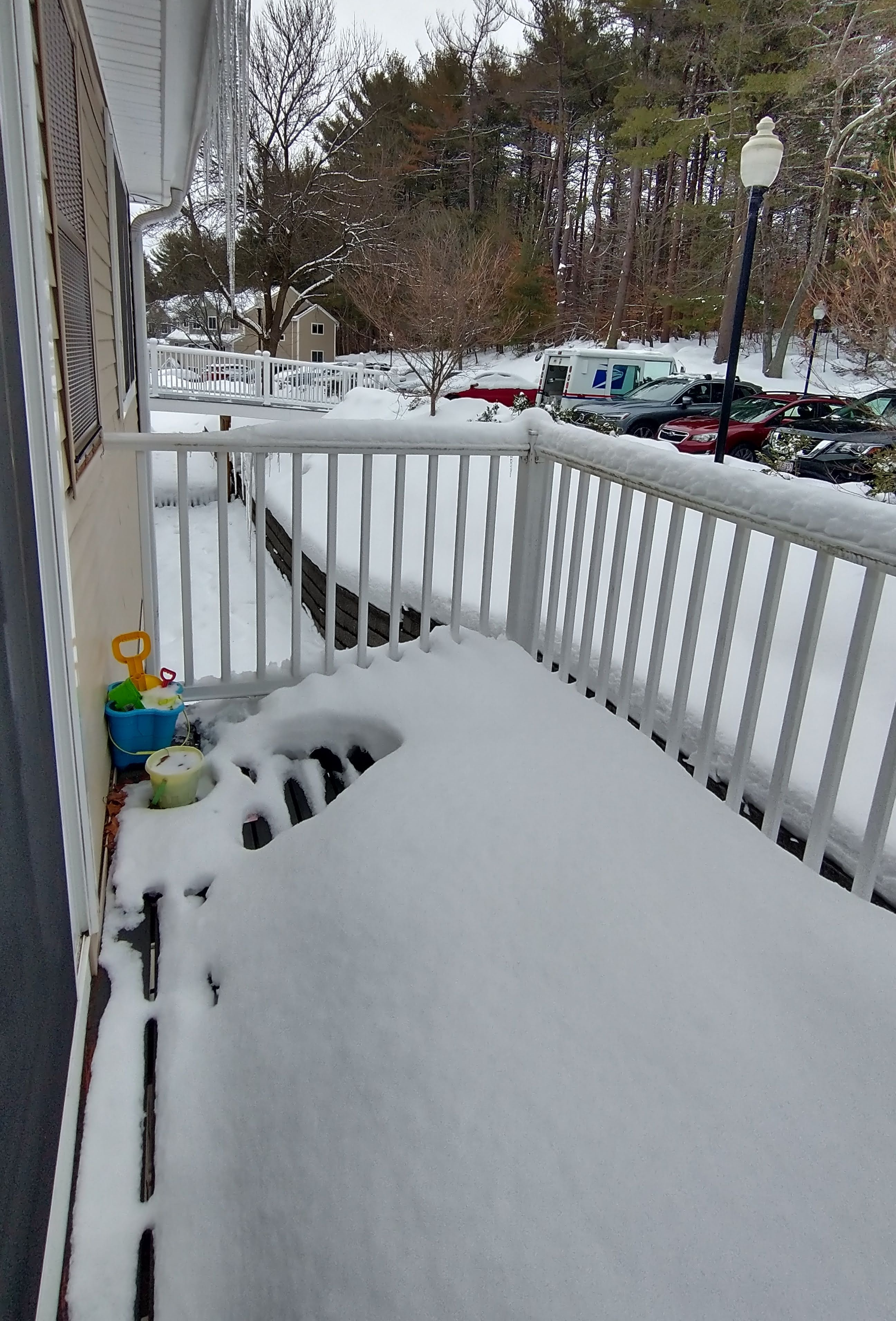
Fresh snow blanketing Lexington, MA on February 20 after the storm

After leaving the Deep South, the winter storm moved up the East Coast, becoming a nor'easter. Up to 0.5 inches (13 mm) of ice accretion was reported in parts of Virginia, West Virginia, and North Carolina. Freezing rain resulted in hundreds of thousands of additional power outages in the area, which was still recovering from the previous week's ice storm. Virginia implemented a winter weather state of emergency effective February 12, due to the previous week's ice storm, which continued through this winter storm. Trees and power lines were downed, and customers who remained without power from the previous storm remained without power for a longer time.

The District of Columbia's snowfall total from the system was 0.5 inches (1.3 cm), while totals in Maryland and Virginia ranged from 6–8 inches (15–20 cm). The high water content of falling sleet and snow resulted in a danger of refreezing slush. Despite road crews working consistently on major highways, Virginia reported 385 crashes and 255 disabled vehicles statewide, and Maryland reported 160 crashes and 90 disabled vehicles. Several area COVID-19 vaccine clinics closed due to the treacherous conditions. The United States Government's Office of Personnel Management announced federal offices in the D.C. area were closed on February 18, and would open with a two-hour delay on February 19, although authorized remote work for the majority of employees continued. During the storm, 10.2 inches (26 cm) of snow fell in Norristown, Pennsylvania, northwest of Philadelphia. The storm brought Philadelphia's total seasonal snowfall total up to 22.5 inches (57 cm), which was exactly average. The snowstorm resulted in many speed restrictions throughout Pennsylvania, with temporarily reductions in speed limit along the Pennsylvania Turnpike from Cranberry to Valley Forge, as well as the entirety of I-83, I-99 and I-283, with restrictions later added on I-84, I-78 I-176 and I-380, as well as extending the Pennsylvania Turnpike restriction to the intersection with I-95. Over 6 inches (15 cm) of snow fell in southeastern Massachusetts, with 7.5 inches (19 cm) being reported in Dartmouth. New York City picked up 4.4 inches (11 cm), pushing their monthly total up to 25.6 inches (65 cm) and making February 2021 their eight-snowiest February on record. Icy roads on New York State Route 27 in North Babylon led to five car crashes resulting in two injuries.

==== Snow and ice totals ====
Highest observed snow totals from each affected state
State	Town	Amount
Arkansas	Sheridan	15 inches (38 cm)
Texas	Lake View	11.2 inches (28 cm)
Pennsylvania	Wayne	11 inches (28 cm)
New Jersey	Freehold	9.7 inches (25 cm)
Oklahoma	Oscar	8 inches (20 cm)
Connecticut	Clinton	7.8 inches (20 cm)
Massachusetts	West Falmouth	7.5 inches (19 cm)
New York	Deer Park	7.5 inches (19 cm)
Rhode Island	North Kingstown	7.5 inches (19 cm)
West Virginia	Shepherdstown	7.2 inches (18 cm)
Tennessee	Memphis	7 inches (18 cm)
New Hampshire	Henniker	6.3 inches (16 cm)
Mississippi	Olive Branch	6.1 inches (15 cm)
Alabama	Leighton	6 inches (15 cm)
Kentucky	Brodhead	6 inches (15 cm)
Maryland	Myersville	6 inches (15 cm)
Virginia	Winchester	5.8 inches (15 cm)
Vermont	Woodford	5.5 inches (14 cm)
Louisiana	Sarepta	4 inches (10 cm)
Maine	Sanford	3.5 inches (8.9 cm)
Missouri	Joplin	3.5 inches (8.9 cm)
Delaware	Wilmington	1.5 inches (3.8 cm)

Highest observed ice totals from each affected state
State	Town	Amount
Louisiana	Harrisonburg	0.7 inches (18 mm)
Mississippi	Collinsville	0.63 inches (16 mm)
Texas	Ingram	0.6 inches (15 mm)
Virginia	Smith River	0.45 inches (11 mm)
North Carolina	Glade Valley	0.4 inches (10 mm)
West Virginia	Beckley	0.35 inches (8.9 mm)
Maryland	California	0.31 inches (7.9 mm)
Pennsylvania	Northeast Philadelphia	0.28 inches (7.1 mm)
Arkansas	Dermott	0.25 inches (6.4 mm)
Delaware	Harbeson	0.25 inches (6.4 mm)
New York	Westhampton	0.18 inches (4.6 mm)
New Jersey	Caldwell	0.14 inches (3.6 mm)

=== Mexico ===
In Acuña, Coahuila, over 20 centimetres (7.9 in) of snow fell during the entirety of the system, mostly from February 17–18. Temperatures of −10 °C (14 °F) with wind chills of −20 °C (−4 °F) accompanied the snow during the event. Heavy snow resulted in numerous road closures on highways, implemented to prevent accidents. Over 170 poor residents were being housed in hotels during the storm, including 70 immigrants. Six fatalities occurred due to the storm in northern Mexico, mostly due to carbon monoxide poisoning. One man died on the street due to exposure to wind, cold, and snow. On February 17, President Andrés Manuel López Obrador said that Mexico would increase usage of oil to produce electricity. He warned that on-and-off power outages from the storm would continue until February 21.

=== Canada ===
From February 18–20, light-to-moderate snow fell across parts of Eastern Canada from the system. A Winter Weather Travel Advisory was issued for parts of Ontario, and a few Snow Squall Warnings were issued for short bursts of heavy snow. Several centimeters of snow fell in much of the region, with up to 10 centimetres (3.9 in) being reported in some areas.

== See also ==
- 2011 Groundhog Day blizzard
- December 2014 North American storm complex
- February 2021 North American ice storm
- February 13–17, 2021 North American winter storm
- List of major power outages
