= Blizzard watch =

Weather advisory in the United States

A blizzard watch was a bulletin issued by the National Weather Service of the United States which meant winds greater than 35 miles per hour (30 kn; 56 km/h), mixed with falling or blowing snow, and visibilities of 1/4 mile (0.4 km) or less is forecast for a period of 3 hours or more. A blizzard watch was issued 12 to 48 hours before an expected blizzard event. As the forecast solidifies, a blizzard watch would be either downgraded to a winter storm warning or winter weather advisory for blowing snow (depending on accumulation amounts) or upgraded to a blizzard warning.

On October 2, 2017, issuance of the blizzard watch has been discontinued. A winter storm watch is now issued in its place. Blizzard warnings continue to be issued, however.

== Example of a blizzard watch ==
URGENT - WINTER WEATHER MESSAGE
NATIONAL WEATHER SERVICE CHICAGO IL
1134 AM CST SUN JAN 30 2011

...MAJOR WINTER STORM TO IMPACT THE REGION TUESDAY INTO WEDNESDAY...

.THE FIRST PHASE OF THE UPCOMING WINTER STORM WILL BEGIN MONDAY
AFTERNOON THROUGH EARLY TUESDAY MORNING FOR NORTHERN ILLINOIS AND
NORTHWEST INDIANA. SNOWFALL TOTALS FROM THE FIRST PHASE APPEARS TO
BE BETWEEN 2 AND 4 INCHES ACROSS NORTHERN ILLINOIS AND NORTHWEST
INDIANA. THE FOCUS TURNS TOWARDS THE LARGER EVENT THAT PUSHES INTO
THE REGION TUESDAY AFTERNOON AND WILL PERSIST THROUGH WEDNESDAY.

A DEVELOPING AREA OF LOW PRESSURE IS EXPECTED TO SLIDE EAST OF THE
ROCKIES INTO EASTERN TEXAS MONDAY NIGHT AND RAPIDLY STRENGTHEN AS
IT SLIDES NORTH TUESDAY. THE PRECISE TRACK OF THE LOW CONTINUES TO
WOBBLE WITH EACH NEW MODEL RUN...HOWEVER RELATIVE CONSISTENCY OF A
TRACK FROM CENTRAL ARKANSAS NORTH TO CENTRAL INDIANA BY WEDNESDAY
MORNING LOOKS TO BE THE MOST PROBABLE TRACK. THIS WOULD PLACE THE
AXIS OF THE HEAVIEST SNOWFALL TO THE NORTHWEST OF THE TRACK OF THE
LOW PRESSURE...OR ACROSS MUCH OF NORTHERN ILLINOIS AND NORTHWEST
INDIANA.

AS THE LOW PRESSURE CONTINUES TO SLIDE NORTH AND STRENGTHEN...NORTHEAST
WINDS OF 30 TO 40 MPH ARE EXPECTED TO DEVELOP AND BRING A FLOW OF
COLD AIR ACROSS LAKE MICHIGAN AIDING IN THE GENERATION OF LAKE
EFFECT SNOW TUESDAY EVENING. WINDS WILL CONTINUE TO RAMP UP WITH
SUSTAINED WINDS TUESDAY EVENING BETWEEN 25 AND 35 MPH WITH GUSTS
UP TO 50 MPH POSSIBLE. NORTHEAST WINDS THEN CONTINUE TO STRENGTHEN
TUESDAY NIGHT INTO EARLY MORNING WEDNESDAY WITH GUSTS UP TO 55 MPH
POSSIBLE. THIS IN COMBINATION WITH THE FALLING SNOWFALL MAY CREATE
BLIZZARD CONDITIONS AND WHITE OUT CONDITIONS. AS THE LOW PRESSURE
CONTINUES TO LIFT NORTH INTO CENTRAL INDIANA WEDNESDAY
MORNING...WINDS WILL BEGIN TO TURN NORTHERLY AND BRING THE LAKE
ENHANCED SNOWFALL TO NORTHWEST INDIANA.

BY LATER WEDNESDAY THE SNOW FROM THE DEPARTING WINTER STORM WILL
BE WINDING DOWN ACROSS THE AREA BUT A BAND OF SIGNIFICANT LAKE
EFFECT SNOW IS EXPECTED IN NORTHWEST INDIANA WHERE SEVERAL
ADDITIONAL INCHES OF SNOW ARE POSSIBLE BEFORE THE LAKE EFFECT
SHIFTS FURTHER OFF TO THE EAST INTO SOUTHWESTERN LOWER MICHIGAN
AND NORTH CENTRAL INDIANA.

BETWEEN THE INITIAL LIGHTER SNOW MONDAY INTO TUESDAY MORNING...
THE HEAVY SNOWFALL FROM THE MAJOR WINTER STORM DURING TUESDAY
AFTERNOON THROUGH WEDNESDAY MORNING...AND THE INCREASINGLY INTENSE
LAKE EFFECT SNOW DEVELOPING DURING WEDNESDAY...IN EXCESS OF A FOOT
AND A HALF OR MORE OF SNOW WILL NOT BE UNCOMMON OVER MUCH OF
NORTHERN ILLINOIS AND FAR NORTHWEST INDIANA. SNOWFALL RATES UP TO
3 INCHES PER HOUR WILL BE PROBABLE AT THE HEIGHT OF THE STORM
TUESDAY NIGHT.

THE STORM SYSTEM WILL BE AFFECTING A LARGE PORTION OF THE
SOUTHERN GREAT LAKES...MIDWEST AND OHIO VALLEY REGIONS. ANYONE
WITH TRAVEL PLANS TUESDAY AND WEDNESDAY...INCLUDING THOSE
TRAVELING THROUGH CHICAGO OHARE AND MIDWAY AIRPORTS...SHOULD
CONTINUE TO MONITOR LATER FORECASTS REGARDING THE DEVELOPMENT OF
THIS WINTER STORM..

ILZ003>006-008-010>014-019>023-032-033-039-INZ001-002-010-011-019-
310145-
/O.CAN.KLOT.WS.A.0001.110201T1800Z-110203T0000Z/
/O.NEW.KLOT.BZ.A.0001.110201T1800Z-110203T0000Z/
WINNEBAGO-BOONE-MCHENRY-LAKE IL-OGLE-LEE-DE KALB-KANE-DUPAGE-COOK-
LA SALLE-KENDALL-GRUNDY-WILL-KANKAKEE-LIVINGSTON-IROQUOIS-FORD-
LAKE IN-PORTER-NEWTON-JASPER-BENTON-
INCLUDING THE CITIES OF...ROCKFORD...BELVIDERE...WOODSTOCK...
WAUKEGAN...OREGON...DIXON...DEKALB...AURORA...WHEATON...CHICAGO...
OTTAWA...OSWEGO...MORRIS...JOLIET...KANKAKEE...PONTIAC...
WATSEKA...PAXTON...GARY...VALPARAISO...MOROCCO...RENSSELAER...
FOWLER
1134 AM CST SUN JAN 30 2011 /1234 PM EST SUN JAN 30 2011/

...BLIZZARD WATCH IN EFFECT FROM TUESDAY AFTERNOON THROUGH
WEDNESDAY AFTERNOON...
...WINTER STORM WATCH IS CANCELLED...

THE NATIONAL WEATHER SERVICE IN CHICAGO HAS ISSUED A BLIZZARD
WATCH...WHICH IS IN EFFECT FROM TUESDAY AFTERNOON THROUGH
WEDNESDAY AFTERNOON. THE WINTER STORM WATCH HAS BEEN CANCELLED.

* TIMING...HEAVY SNOWFALL WILL SPREAD NORTHEASTWARD ACROSS THE
  AREA MIDDAY TUESDAY AND CONTINUE THROUGH TUESDAY NIGHT. AS THE
  SNOWFALL FROM THE STORM SYSTEM STARTS TO WIND DOWN DURING
  WEDNESDAY MORNING AND EARLY AFTERNOON...LAKE EFFECT SNOW WILL
  HAVE DEVELOPED ON THE ILLINOIS SIDE OF THE LAKE. INCREASINGLY
  HEAVY AND MORE CONCENTRATED LAKE EFFECT SNOW WILL SHIFT INTO
  FAR NORTHWEST INDIANA DURING WEDNESDAY AFTERNOON AND PERSIST
  INTO WEDNESDAY EVENING BEFORE SHIFTING FURTHER OFF TO THE EAST
  INTO SOUTHWEST LOWER MICHIGAN AND NORTH CENTRAL INDIANA.

* ACCUMULATIONS...TOTAL ACCUMULATIONS FROM MONDAY MORNING THROUGH
  WEDNESDAY EVENING ARE EXPECTED TO BE IN EXCESS OF 8 INCHES IN
  NORTH CENTRAL ILLINOIS...AND IN EXCESS OF 18 INCHES OVER
  NORTHEAST AND EAST CENTRAL ILLINOIS...AS WELL AS NORTHWEST
  INDIANA. LOCAL AMOUNTS IN EXCESS OF 24 INCHES ARE POSSIBLE IN
  FAR NORTHWEST INDIANA...DEPENDING ON EXACTLY WHERE THE LAKE
  EFFECT SNOW BAND SETS UP AND HOW PERSISTENT IT IS OVER ANY ONE
  LOCATION.

* HAZARDS...BLIZZARD CONDITIONS WITH CONSIDERABLE BLOWING AND
  DRIFTING SNOW AND FREQUENT WHITE OUT CONDITIONS.

* IMPACTS...NEARLY IMPOSSIBLE TRAVEL CONDITIONS AS SNOW WILL BE
  ACCUMULATING AT A RAPID RATE DURING THE PEAK OF THE SNOW STORM
  TUESDAY AFTERNOON AND NIGHT. HEAVY LAKE EFFECT SNOW IN NORTHWEST
  INDIANA LATER WEDNESDAY AND WEDNESDAY EVENING WILL CONTINUE TO
  SNARL TRAVEL THERE.

PRECAUTIONARY/PREPAREDNESS ACTIONS...

A BLIZZARD WATCH MEANS THERE IS A POTENTIAL FOR FALLING AND/OR
BLOWING SNOW WITH STRONG WINDS AND EXTREMELY POOR VISIBILITIES.
THIS CAN LEAD TO WHITEOUT CONDITIONS AND MAKE TRAVEL VERY
DANGEROUS.

$$
TG/KD

== See also ==
- Blizzard warning
- Winter storm watch
- Severe weather terminology (United States)
