= December 2020 nor'easter =

The name December 2020 nor'easter may refer to one of two nor'easters in the Eastern United States in 2020.

- December 5–6, 2020 nor'easter – a strong nor'easter and bomb cyclone that impacted much of New England with heavy snow and strong winds
- December 15–17, 2020 nor'easter – a powerful Category 2 nor'easter that brought widespread heavy snow and ice to much of the Northeastern United States
