= December 5–6, 2020 nor'easter =

North American nor'easter in 2020

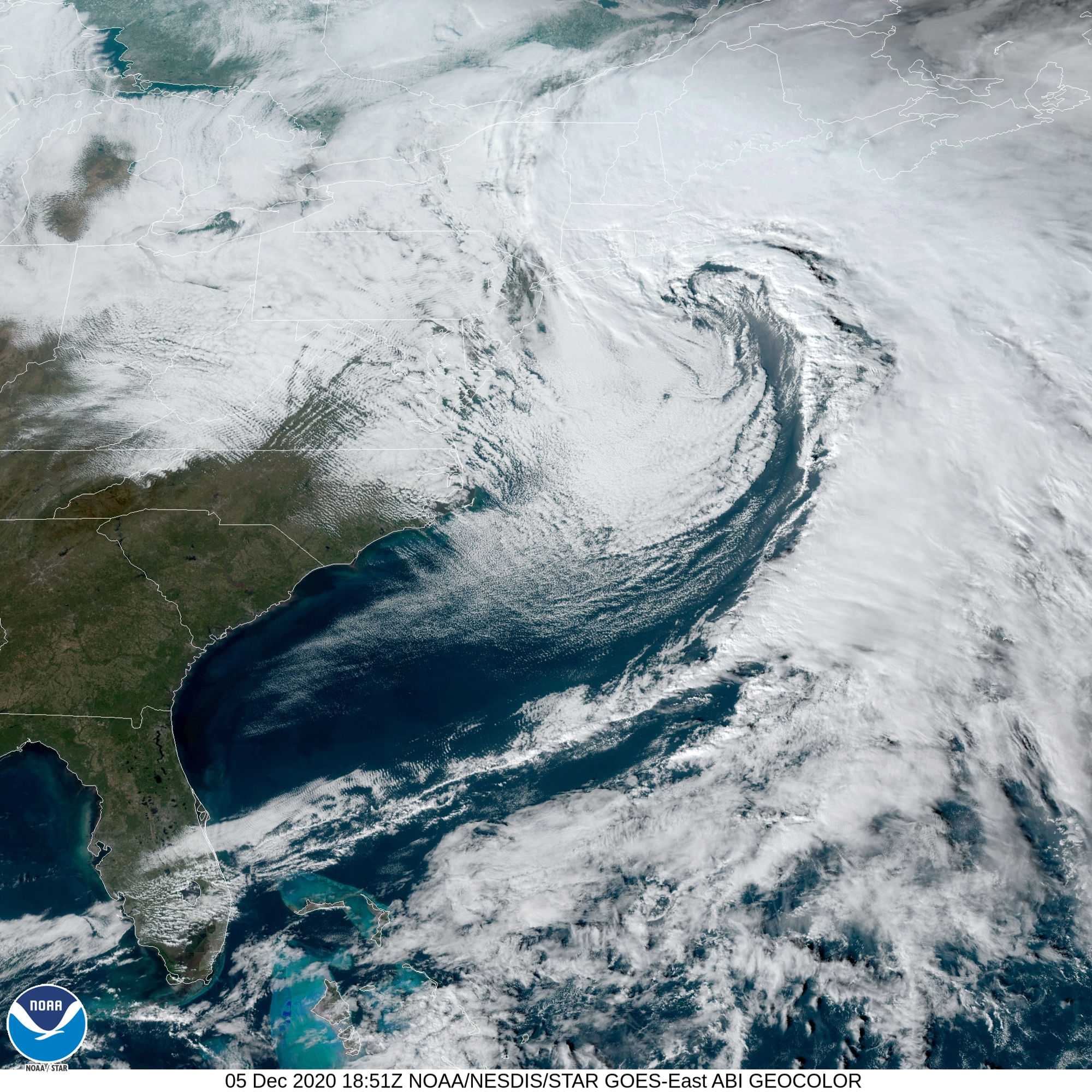
- GOES-16 satellite imagery of the rapidly deepening nor'easter impacting New England at 14:19 UTC (9:19 a.m. EST) on December 5

Meteorological history
- Formed: December 4, 2020
- Dissipated: December 8, 2020

Nor'easter
- Highest winds: 75 mph (120 km/h) (1-minute sustained winds)
- Highest gusts: 105 mph (169 km/h) at Mount Washington, New Hampshire
- Lowest pressure: 976 mbar (hPa); 28.82 inHg
- Max. rainfall: 2.62 in (6.7 cm) at Newport, Rhode Island
- Max. snowfall: Snow – 18 in (46 cm) at Carrabassett Valley, Maine

Overall effects
- Damage: > $25 million (2021 USD)
- Areas affected: Southeastern United States, Northeastern United States, Atlantic Canada
- Power outages: > 280,000
- Part of the 2020–21 North American winter

A quick-moving nor'easter, unofficially named Winter Storm Eartha by The Weather Channel, brought heavy snowfall, hurricane-force wind gusts, blizzard conditions, and coastal flooding to much of New England in the first few days of December 2020. The system originated on the Mid-Atlantic coast late on December 4. It then moved up the East Coast of the United States from December 5–6, bombing out and bringing heavy wet snow to the New England states. It brought up to 18 inches (46 cm) of snow in northern New England, with widespread totals of 6–12 inches (15–30 cm) farther south.

The nor'easter caused over 280,000 power outages, mostly in Maine, in addition to causing several injuries. The system is estimated to have caused at least $25 million (2021 USD) in damage.

== Meteorological history ==
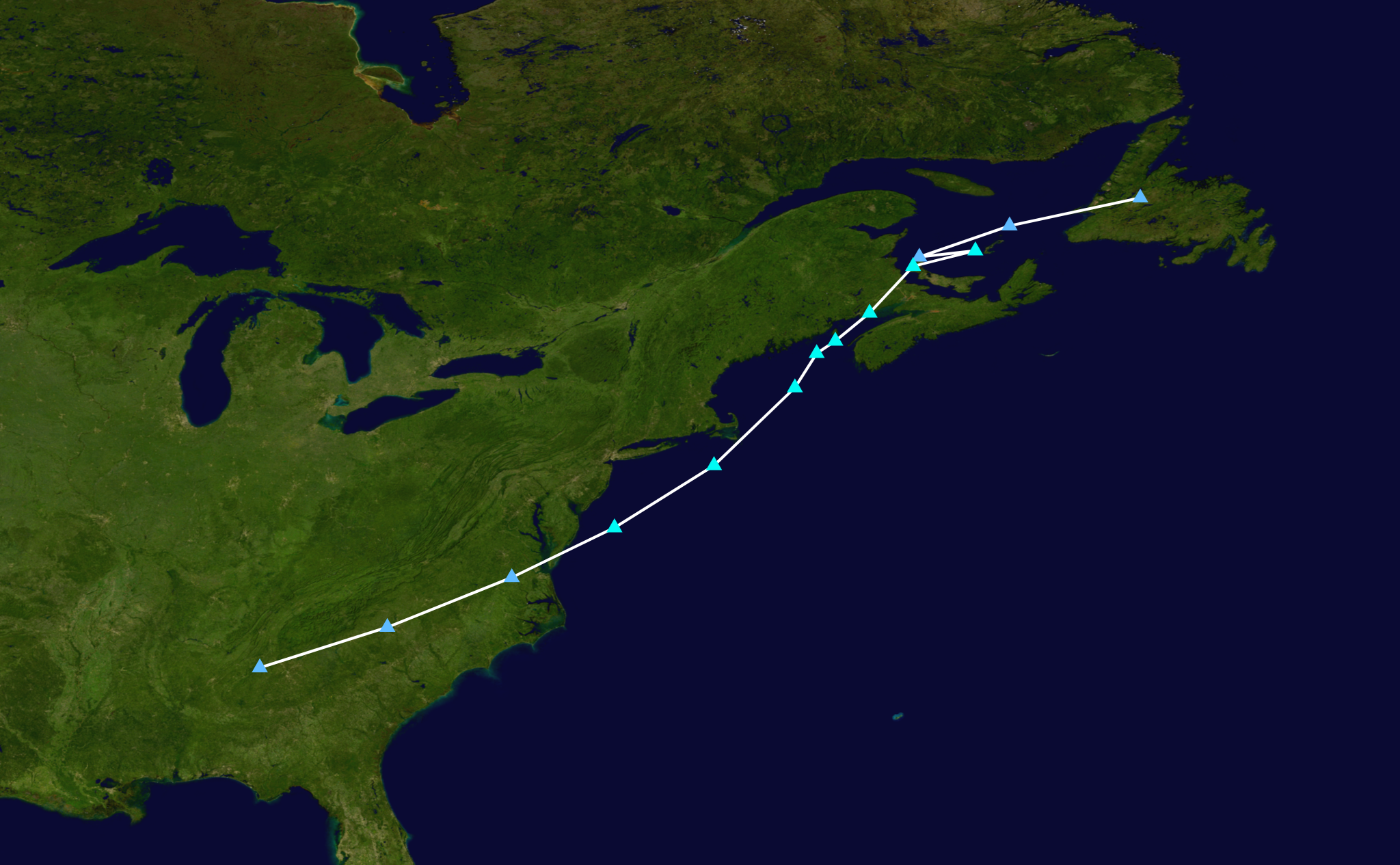
Map plotting the storm's track and intensity, according to the Saffir–Simpson scale Map key Saffir–Simpson scale Tropical depression (≤38 mph, ≤62 km/h) Tropical storm (39–73 mph, 63–118 km/h) Category 1 (74–95 mph, 119–153 km/h) Category 2 (96–110 mph, 154–177 km/h) Category 3 (111–129 mph, 178–208 km/h) Category 4 (130–156 mph, 209–251 km/h) Category 5 (≥157 mph, ≥252 km/h) Unknown Storm type Tropical cyclone Subtropical cyclone Extratropical cyclone, remnant low, tropical disturbance, or monsoon depression

The nor'easter originated as a weak frontal system over Alabama late on December 4. Several hours later, the system began to grow more organized, transitioning into an extratropical cyclone over North Carolina by 03:00 UTC on December 5. The developing low-pressure exited the coast 6 hours later, with a minimum central pressure of 1,000 millibars (30 inHg). After this point, the nor'easter began to undergo bombogenesis, reaching an initial central pressure of 984 millibars (29.1 inHg) off the coast of Rhode Island at 18:00 UTC that day. After making landfall in Nantucket 3 hours later with a central pressure of 981 millibars (29.0 inHg), the low-pressure strengthened further, reaching its peak intensity of 976 millibars (28.8 inHg) at 06:00 UTC on December 6 off the coast of Maine. After slowly weakening for several hours that, it made landfall in New Brunswick at 18:00 UTC with a central pressure of 984 millibars (29.1 inHg). The system weakened slightly over New Brunswick, but began to weaken faster after emerging into the Gulf of Saint Lawrence. At 21:00 UTC on December 7, the weakening nor'easter made landfall in Newfoundland with a central pressure of 992 millibars (29.3 inHg). After this point, the low-pressure began to rapidly weaken, with the system dissipating inland over Newfoundland the next day.

== Preparations and impact ==
Winter Storm Warnings were issued on December 4 and 5 in advance of heavy, wet snow and possible blizzard conditions across New England, including both Boston and Portland. Winter Weather Advisories were issued further south, and High Wind Warnings were placed into effect on Cape Cod in anticipation of hurricane-force wind gusts.

=== Southern New England ===
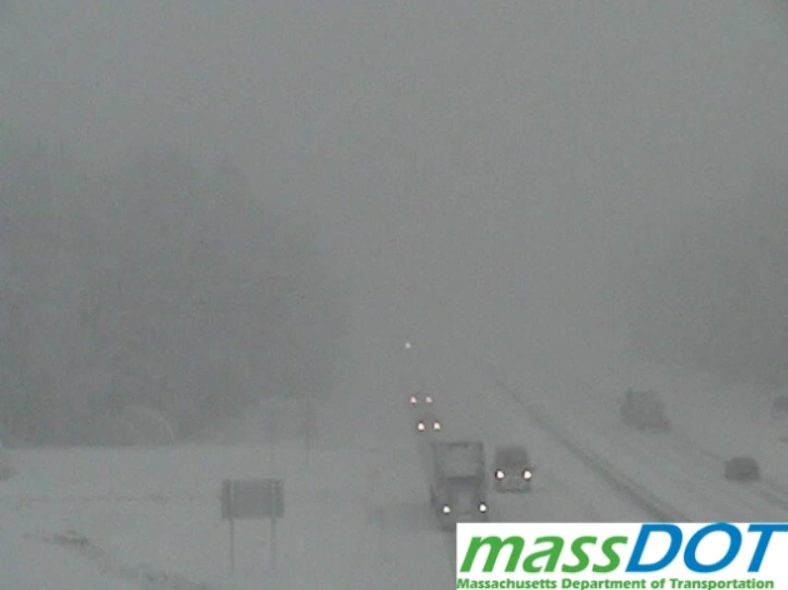
Whiteout conditions and poor road conditions in Warren, Massachusetts, on the afternoon of December 5

In Connecticut, near-whiteout conditions were reported for prolonged periods on December 5, leading to numerous crashes on interstates. I-84 was closed in both directions from Tolland, Connecticut, to the Massachusetts state line for hours as a result of numerous crashes and a lack of snowplows.

Massachusetts State Police lowered the speed limit to 40 mph on I-90 at noon on December 5 due to ongoing whiteout conditions on the roadways. A crash was reported on I-90 in Millbury a few hours later, prompting the closure of two lanes. Over 1,800 snow removal vehicles were deployed in Massachusetts to clear roads of snow and ice. Over 26,000 power outages resulted in Massachusetts, and several thousand of those were not restored until the next day. Dennis recorded a wind gust of 68 mph (109 km/h) on the afternoon of December 5.

=== Northern New England ===
In New Hampshire, Mount Washington recorded the second-highest snow total during the storm with 17.9 inches (45 cm) falling there and the highest wind gust during the storm, with a peak wind gust of 105 mph (169 km/h). The state recorded over 60,000 power outages, and most were not restored until December 6 or 7.

Carrabassett Valley, Maine, recorded the highest snowfall total during the storm, with a total of 18 in (46 cm). Meanwhile, Cranberry Isles reported sustained winds of 70 mph (110 km/h) during the height of the storm. Maine also had the highest number of power outages, with 210,000 customers being put without power and some outages lasting for days. Much of Maine also faced whiteout and near-blizzard conditions for prolonged periods of time, resulting in numerous crashes on roadways.

== See also ==
- December 2009 North American blizzard
- December 17–22, 2012 North American blizzard
- March 2014 nor'easter
- January 2016 United States blizzard
- December 15–17, 2020 nor'easter
- 2021 Super Bowl Sunday nor'easter
