= Freezing rain advisory =

Weather advisory in the United States

A freezing rain advisory was an advisory issued by the National Weather Service in the United States when freezing rain or freezing drizzle was expected to cause significant inconveniences, but did not meet warning criteria (typically greater than 1/4 inch or 6.4 millimetres of ice accumulation).

On October 2, 2017, issuance of the freezing rain advisory was discontinued. A winter weather advisory is now issued when the above criteria are forecast to be met. However, ice storm warnings continue to be issued.

== Example ==
         Freezing Rain Advisory

URGENT - WINTER WEATHER MESSAGE
NATIONAL WEATHER SERVICE GOODLAND KS
248 AM MST THU DEC 18 2008

...FREEZING DRIZZLE AND FREEZING FOG EXPECTED TO DEVELOP
TODAY...

.AN UPPER LEVEL STORM SYSTEM WILL MOVE INTO THE CENTRAL HIGH
PLAINS TODAY. AS WARM AIR ALOFT OVERRIDES COLD AIR AT THE
SURFACE...FREEZING DRIZZLE AND FREEZING FOG WILL DEVELOP. WHILE
WIDESPREAD ACCUMULATIONS OF ICE ARE NOT ANTICIPATED...TRAVEL COULD
BECOME HAZARDOUS AS ICY SPOTS DEVELOP ON THE ROADS AND BRIDGES.

KSZ001>004-013>016-029-NEZ079>081-181800-
/O.EXT.KGLD.ZR.Y.0002.081218T1800Z-081219T0000Z/
CHEYENNE KS-RAWLINS-DECATUR-NORTON-SHERMAN-THOMAS-SHERIDAN-GRAHAM-
GOVE-DUNDY-HITCHCOCK-RED WILLOW-
INCLUDING THE CITIES OF...ST. FRANCIS...ATWOOD...OBERLIN...
NORTON...GOODLAND...COLBY...HOXIE...HILL CITY...QUINTER...
BENKELMAN...TRENTON...MCCOOK
248 AM MST THU DEC 18 2008 /348 AM CST THU DEC 18 2008/

...FREEZING RAIN ADVISORY NOW IN EFFECT FROM 11 AM MST /NOON CST/
THIS MORNING TO 5 PM MST /6 PM CST/ THIS AFTERNOON...

THE FREEZING RAIN ADVISORY IS NOW IN EFFECT FROM 11 AM MST /NOON
CST/ THIS MORNING TO 5 PM MST /6 PM CST/ THIS AFTERNOON.

FREEZING DRIZZLE AND FREEZING FOG WILL DEVELOP THIS AFTERNOON AS
WARM AIR RIDES UP OVER TOP OF COLD AIR TRAPPED AT THE SURFACE.
LATER THIS EVENING THE LOW PRESSURE SYSTEM WILL CONTINUE NORTH
EAST AS COOLER AIR ALOFT MOVES OVERHEAD...CAUSING FREEZING RAIN
AND DRIZZLE TO CHANGE OVER TO SNOW. LESS THAN A HALF OF AN INCH
OF SNOW ACCUMULATION IS EXPECTED.

A FREEZING RAIN ADVISORY MEANS THAT PERIODS OF FREEZING RAIN OR
FREEZING DRIZZLE WILL FORM A GLAZE ON ROADS RESULTING IN
HAZARDOUS TRAVEL. SLOW DOWN AND USE CAUTION WHILE DRIVING BECAUSE
EVEN TRACE AMOUNTS OF ICE ON ROADS CAN BE DANGEROUS.

== See also ==
- Severe weather terminology (United States)
