= December 15–17, 2020 nor'easter =

North American nor'easter in 2020

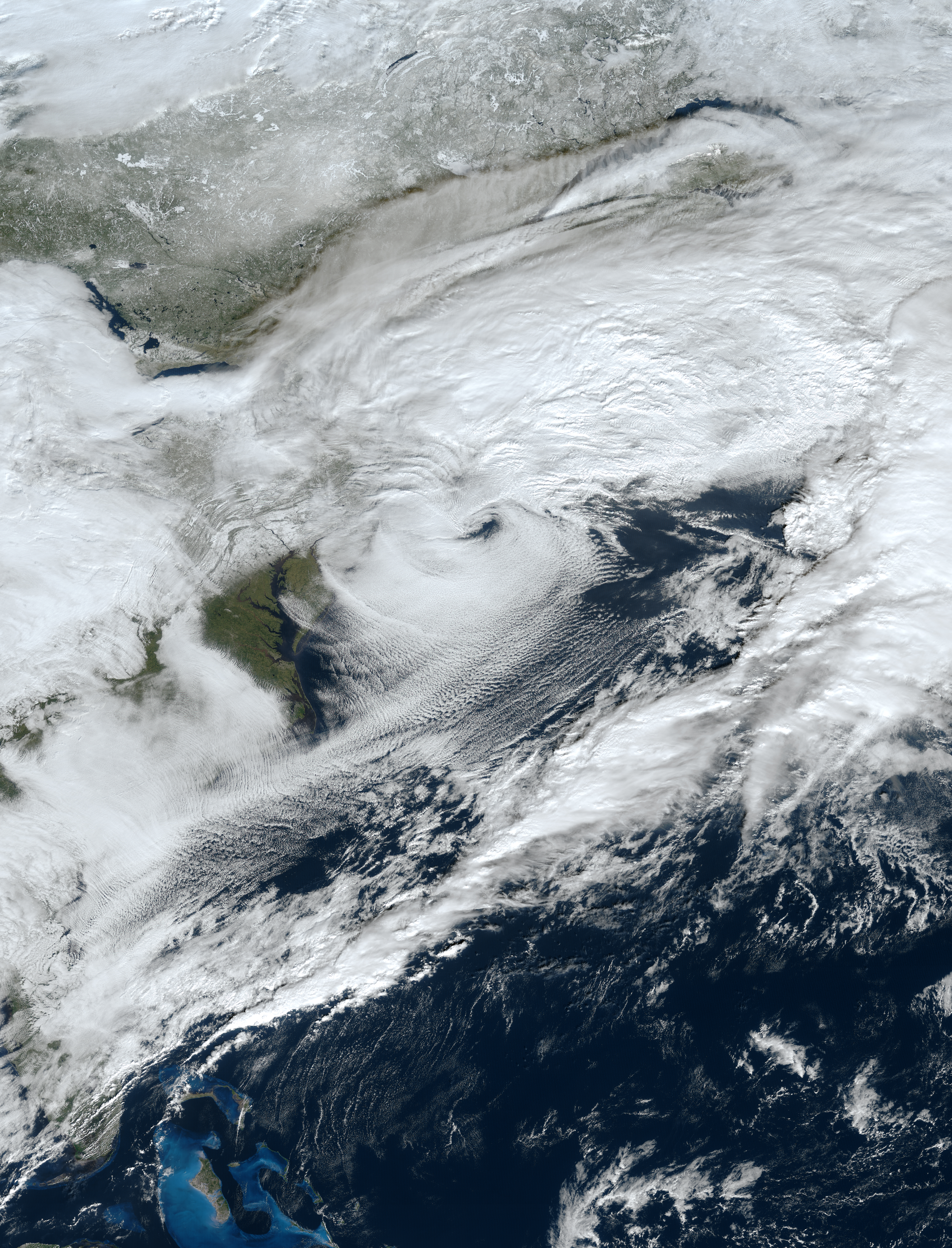
- GOES-16 satellite image of the nor'easter off the New England coast at 15:56 UTC (10:56 a.m. EST) on December 17, with an eye-like feature

Meteorological history
- Formed: December 14, 2020
- Exited land: December 17, 2020
- Dissipated: December 19, 2020

Category 2 "Minor" winter storm
- Regional snowfall index: 5.58 (NOAA)
- Highest winds: 60 mph (95 km/h) (1-minute sustained winds)
- Highest gusts: 63 mph (101 km/h) in Mantoloking, New Jersey
- Lowest pressure: 995 mbar (hPa); 29.38 inHg
- Max. snowfall: Snow – 48 in (120 cm) near Danbury, New Hampshire; Ice – 0.60 in (1.5 cm) near Pipers Gap, Virginia

Tornado outbreak
- Tornadoes: 2
- Max. rating: EF2 tornado
- Duration: 1 hour, 26 minutes

Overall effects
- Fatalities: 7 total
- Damage: > $125 million (2021 USD)
- Areas affected: Southern Plains, Upland South, Southeastern and Northeastern United States (primarily New England and the Mid-Atlantic), Atlantic Canada
- Power outages: 230,000 in Maine alone
- Part of the 2020–21 North American winter

From December 15–17, 2020, a powerful nor'easter, unofficially named Winter Storm Gail by the Weather Channel and various media outlets, hammered the Northeastern United States and produced widespread swaths of over 1 foot (12 in) of snow in much of the region, ending a 1,000+ day high-impact snowstorm drought in much of the Mid-Atlantic and coastal New England regions. The system developed out of a weak area of low-pressure that first developed over the Central United States producing some snowfall before moving eastward, and by December 16, a new, dominant area of low pressure began to develop along the Southeast coast. This low steadily deepened as it moved along and impacted the Mid-Atlantic coastline, prompting several winter-related advisories and warnings for much of the Northeast.

Multiple states that were expected to be impacted by the nor'easter, including New Jersey, Pennsylvania, and Virginia declared states of emergencies on December 15–16 in advance of the storm. New York and Boston declared a snow emergency the day of the storm as well. The nor'easter brought significant snowfall to metropolitan areas such as New York City, Philadelphia, and Washington, D.C., which eclipsed the entire snowfall total from the previous winter season, as well as Boston and Portland that saw over a foot of snow from the storm. Tens of thousands lost power during the storm, and the storm caused high wind gusts along the Jersey Shore, in addition to rough surf and even storm surge in coastal Massachusetts. At least 7 people have been confirmed killed as a result from the storm, and it is estimated to have caused over $125 million (2021 USD) in damages. The winter storm was rated Category 2 winter storm on the regional snowfall index (RSI) scale, the first such storm for the Northeastern United States since a nor'easter in March 2018.

== Meteorological history ==
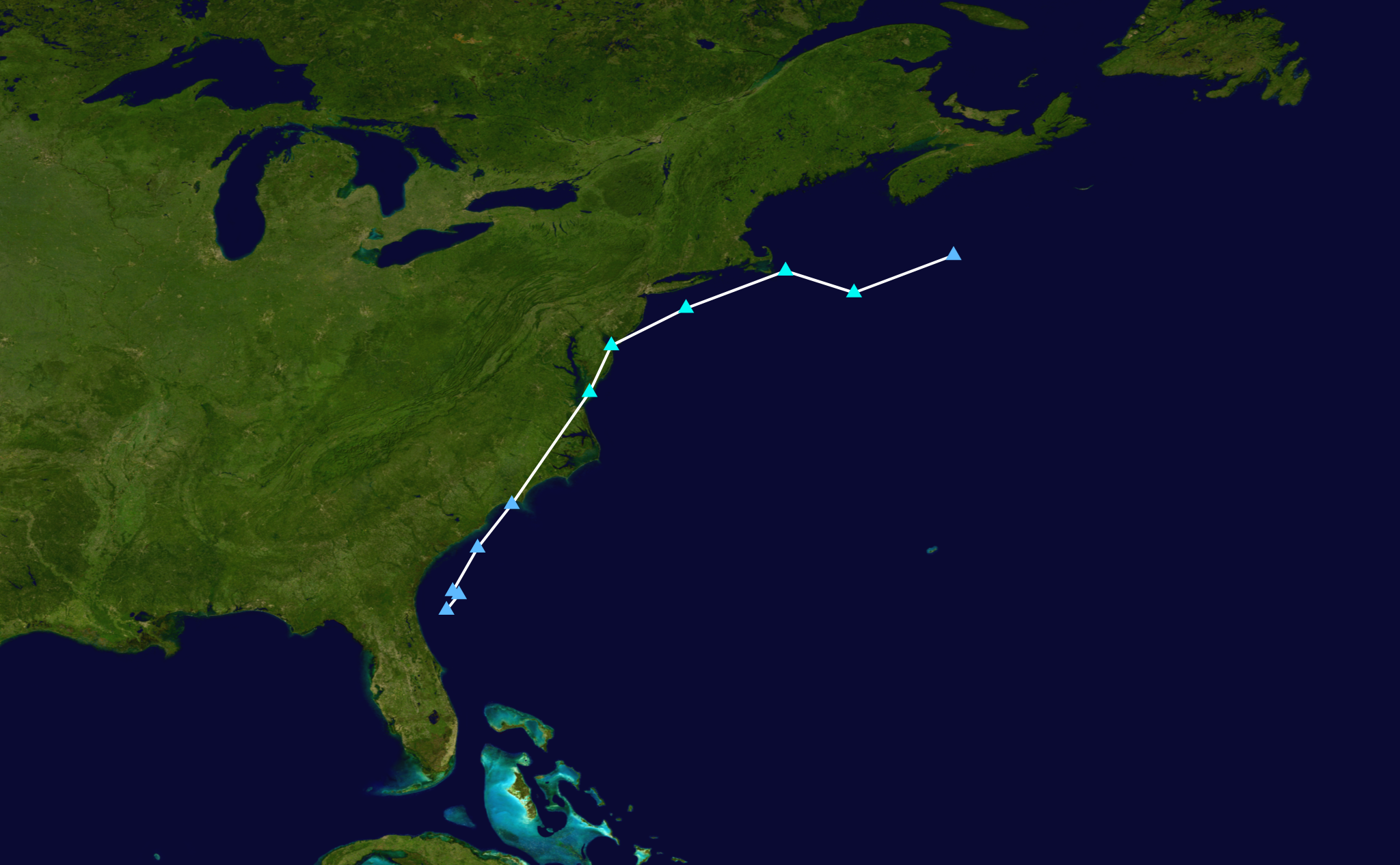
Map plotting the storm's track and intensity, according to the Saffir–Simpson scale Map key Saffir–Simpson scale Tropical depression (≤38 mph, ≤62 km/h) Tropical storm (39–73 mph, 63–118 km/h) Category 1 (74–95 mph, 119–153 km/h) Category 2 (96–110 mph, 154–177 km/h) Category 3 (111–129 mph, 178–208 km/h) Category 4 (130–156 mph, 209–251 km/h) Category 5 (≥157 mph, ≥252 km/h) Unknown Storm type Tropical cyclone Subtropical cyclone Extratropical cyclone, remnant low, tropical disturbance, or monsoon depression

The nor'easter originated from a disorganized winter storm in the Southern Plains of the United States, late on December 14. The winter storm became more widespread the next day, as a low-pressure system developed, and it began to spread snowfall in Oklahoma and Kansas. The system slowly moved eastward across the Southern Plains throughout the day on December 15. On the next day, the system reached the Eastern United States and began spreading snow, ice, and rain across the region. Early on December 17, the system then moved off the coast and developed strong winds and heavier precipitation, while the snowfall spread northward. As the low-pressure system began to strengthen, the rain-snow line pushed northward as well. The center of low pressure moved northeastward, parallel to the coast, before reaching its peak intensity at 12:00 UTC on December 17, while situated off the coast of New Jersey, with a minimum central pressure of 995 millibars (29.4 inHg). The nor'easter also developed an eye-like feature around this time. A combination of moisture from the tropical eastern Pacific and the Gulf of Mexico, very strong low- to mid-level warm air advection, and strong frontogenesis led to strong mesoscale banding, which resulted in heavy snowfall rates for several hours over parts of the Northeastern United States. The nor'easter developed a secondary low to the east later that day and gradually began to weaken, as it began moving away from the Northeastern U.S. A high-pressure system to the east of Atlantic Canada then steered the nor'easter away from the coast, after it passed south of New England, and the storm raced off eastward into the Atlantic. For the next couple of days, the nor'easter continued moving eastward, before the original low was absorbed into the developing secondary low to the east, on December 20. This new storm subsequently strengthened, and the system was named Greta by the Free University of Berlin on the same day.

== Preparations ==
All warnings and advisories issued in the Northeastern United States due to the storm
Winter storm warning
Winter storm watch
Winter weather advisory
Coastal flood advisory
Special weather statement

On December 14, winter storm watches were placed into effect in a large swath from Virginia up through southern New England. Early the next day, watches located from Virginia to Western New Jersey were updated to winter storm warnings. Simultaneously, Winter Weather Advisories were issued for the southern end of the storm. Later winter storm warnings were issued up through most of southern New England.

=== Mid-Atlantic states ===
On December 16, Governor Ralph Northam of Virginia declared a state of emergency.

300 snow plows were deployed to apply salt to many major roads and bridges due to expected snowfall.

On December 15, Governor Tom Wolf declared a state of emergency for Pennsylvania. 100 pieces of equipment to treat roads were also deployed at the beginning of the storm. In Philadelphia, classes that were already in virtual learning due to COVID-19 were instructed to continue with classes December 17.

On December 16, the Governor of New Jersey, Phil Murphy, declared a state of emergency. NJ Transit suspended bus and train travel beginning at 6:30 p.m. EST as a result of the degrading conditions. The state also imposed travel restrictions across several interstates, including Interstates 78, 80 and 280.

In New York City, mayor Bill de Blasio announced that schools in the city would transition to online learning for the day of December 17, citing the snow. Governor Andrew Cuomo declared states of emergency in 18 counties, all upstate. The New York State Thruway speed limits were reduced to 45 mph (72 km/h) from upstate cities such as Syracuse, to areas to the south such as New York City.

=== New England ===
Connecticut Governor Ned Lamont ordered all large trucks off the state's highways beginning at 9:00 PM EST on December 16. The truck ban was lifted at 9:00 AM on December 18. The Connecticut Department of Transportation mobilized hundreds of snowplows to keep the state's roads open during the storm.

Massachusetts Governor Charlie Baker urged residents in his state to stay at home during the nor'easter. The Massachusetts Department of Transportation fully deployed its resources to clear the roads, including 3,800 pieces of snow-fighting equipment to be used on some 15,000 miles of roads. The Massachusetts Emergency Management Agency's emergency operations center was activated. Boston Mayor Marty Walsh declared a snow emergency in the city ahead of the storm. A parking ban was implemented and all school buildings were closed on December 16. City departments and some COVID-19 testing sites were also closed as a result of the storm.

== Impact ==
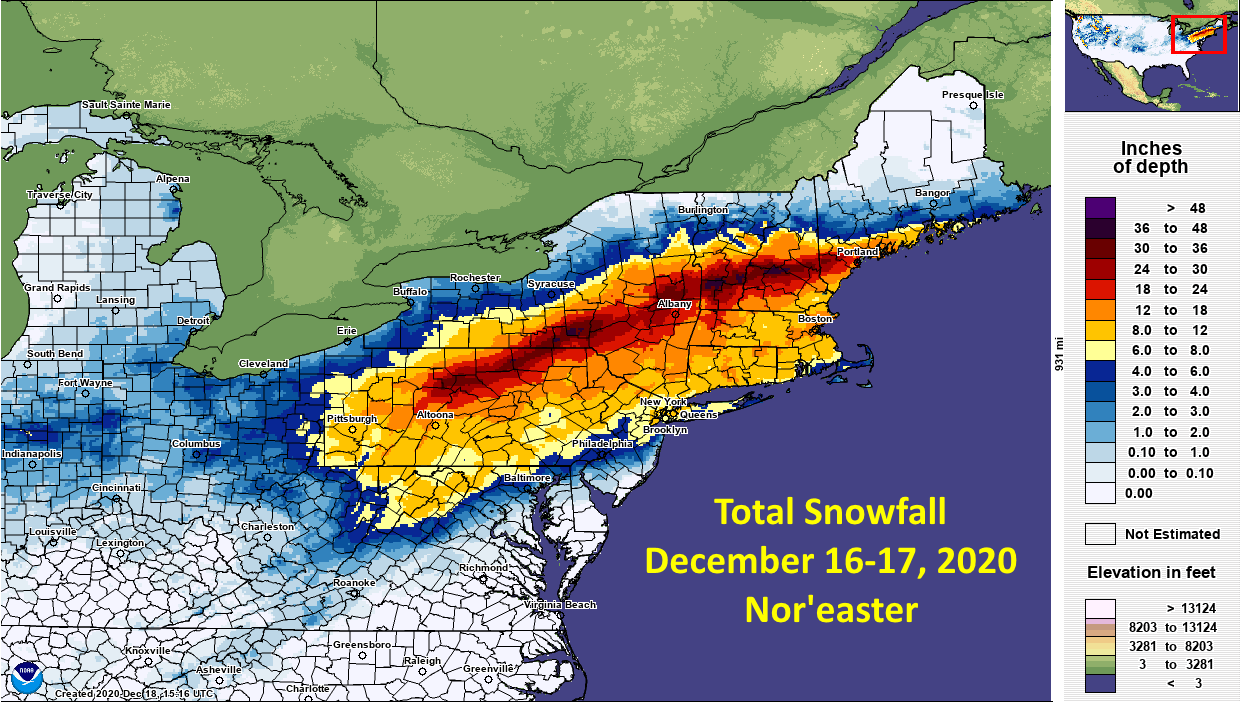
Observed snowfall accumulation from December 16–17 across the Eastern United States

Due to icy conditions on the roadways as well as heavy snow and sleet, the distribution of the COVID-19 vaccine became more difficult.

=== United States ===
==== Southeast ====
Severe weather from the warm sector of the storm was reported near Tampa Bay in Florida. Tornado warnings were issued in Hillsborough County and Pinellas County, Florida. A large and damaging tornado was confirmed in Pinellas County, though no casualties were reported. However, tornadoes resulted in $16.28 million in damage.

==== Mid-Atlantic states ====
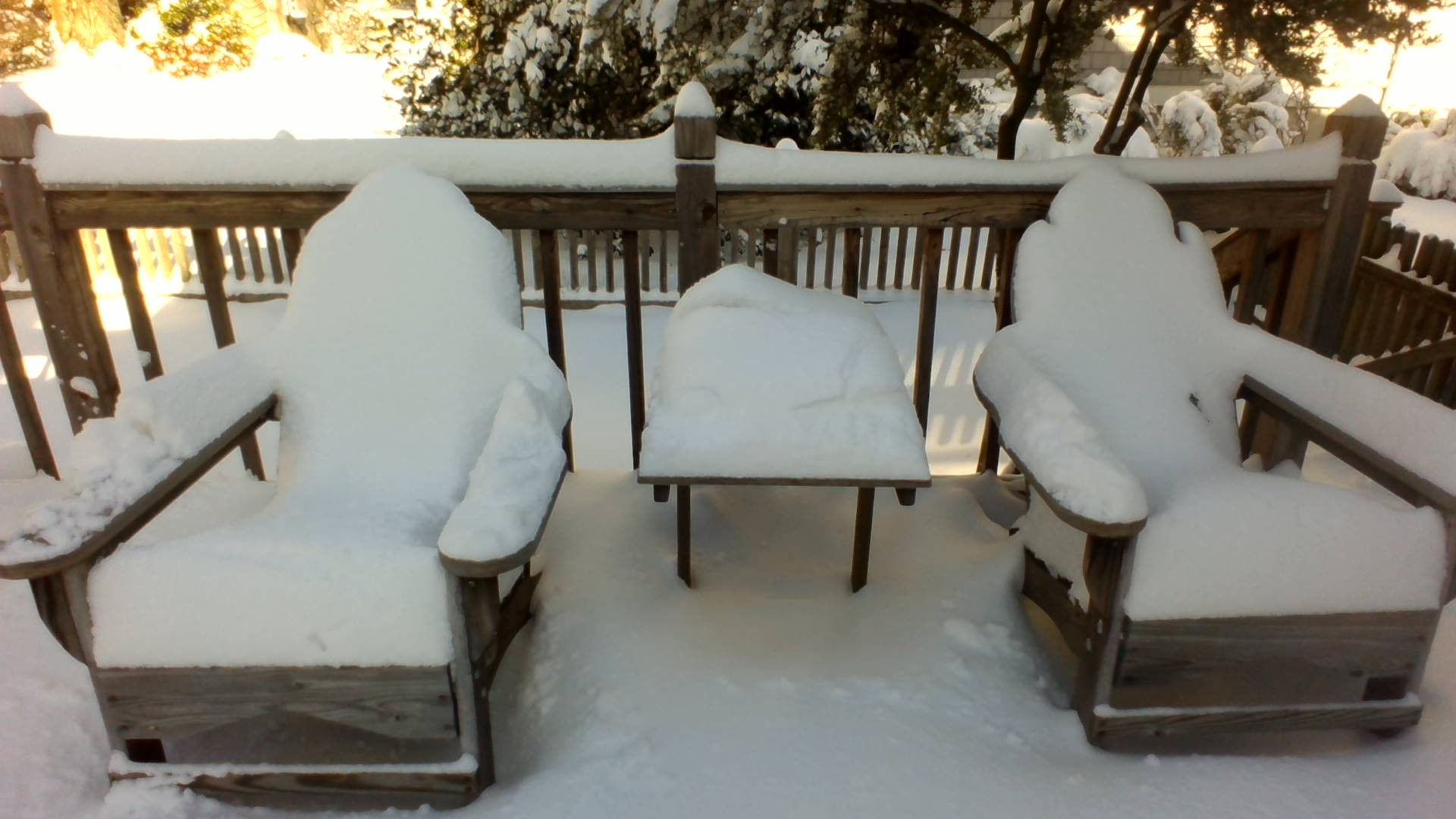
Snowfall accumulation in Essex County, New Jersey, on December 17, 2020

Virginia State Police responded to about 200 crashes and 125 disabled vehicles across the state. By 6:45 p.m. local time, Dominion Energy reported nearly 20,000 power outages, mainly across the Shenandoah Valley, western Piedmont. Appalachian Power reported roughly 3,000 outages in southwestern Virginia, and more than 6,800 customers were without power in the Rappahannock Electric Cooperative area. The National Weather Service received a report of up to 0.6 in (1.5 cm) of freezing rain east of Galax and a half-inch in western Bedford County.

Maryland State Police responded to 489 service calls on December 16 between 9 a.m. and 3 p.m. local time, including 161 crashes and 60 abandoned or disabled vehicles. The Baltimore Police Department responded to 88 calls for accidents around the city Wednesday since 12:00 p.m. local time. There was a very wide range of snowfall, from one foot of snow in Sabillasville, to 0.7 inches (1.8 cm) of snow in Olney. On the morning of December 17, Spirit Airlines Flight 696 skidded off the taxiway after landing at Baltimore-Washington Thurgood Marshall Airport due to snow and ice accumulations. There were no injuries from the crash.

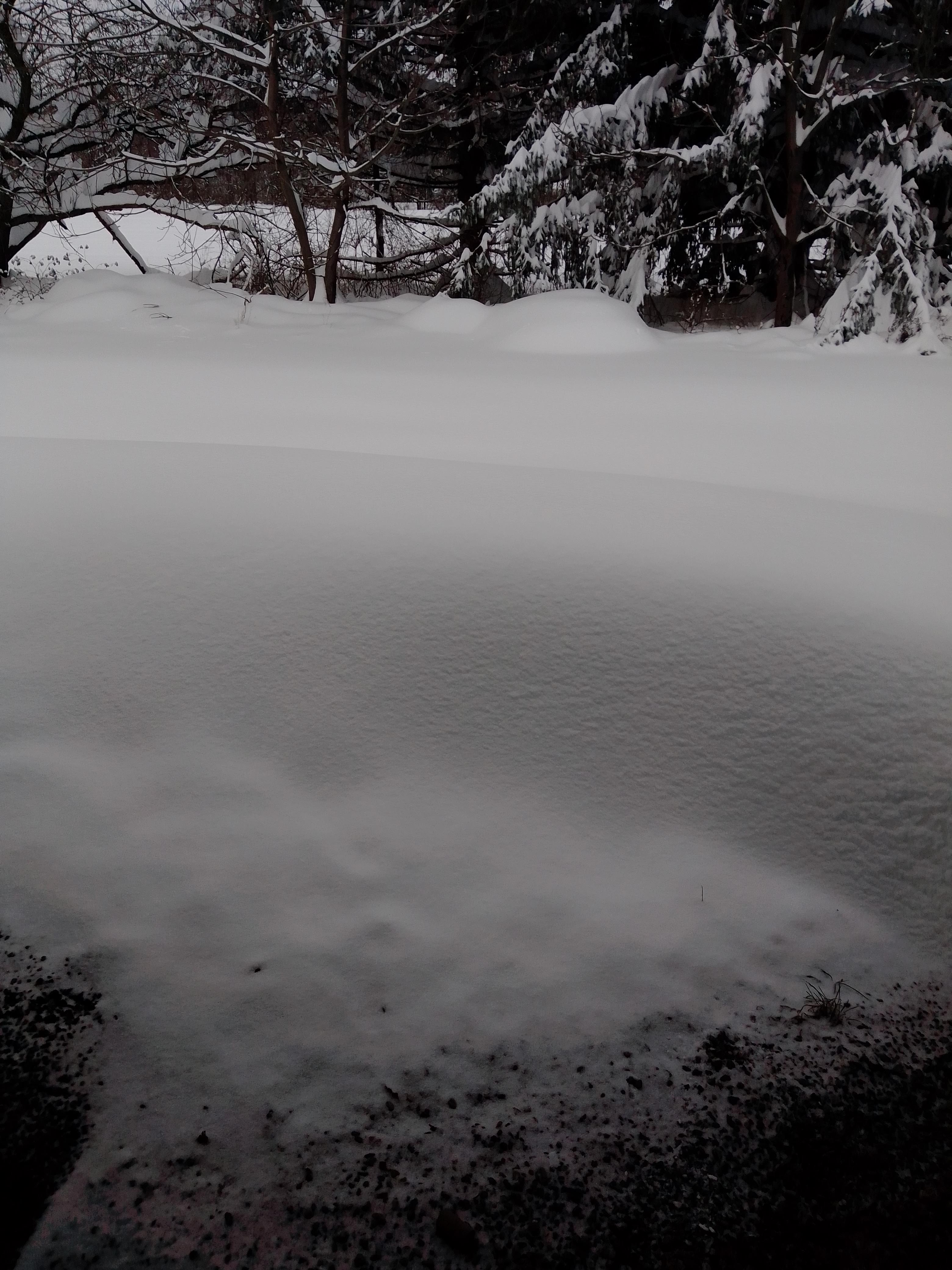
Snowfall accumulation in Newark Valley, New York on December 17, 2020

By late December 16, power outages peaked around 14,000 in New Jersey, before decreasing by the following morning. Strong gusty winds were reported as well, especially close to the Jersey Shore, where a peak gust of 62 mph (100 km/h) in Mantoloking was recorded late on December 16. At times, snowfall rates within the state averaged 2–3 inches (5.1–7.6 cm) an hour, particularly in the northern portion. 11.4 inches (29 cm) of snow was recorded at Newark.

In Philadelphia, Pennsylvania, the city recorded 6.3 inches (16 cm) of snow, the highest since 2018 and more than the entirety of the previous winter season. The Pittsburgh area got 9.3 inches (24 cm), the most since the 2010 storm. North of there got over a foot of snow. The snowstorm became the largest on record in Williamsport, Pennsylvania, with 24.7 inches (63 cm) of snow. The snowstorm caused a pickup truck to crash into an EMS truck in Collier Township, Pennsylvania, in the Pittsburgh metropolitan area. The crew cleared before the truck hit, according to footage. Two people in Clinton County were killed in a multi-dozen car pileup on Interstate 80.

The Binghamton, New York area saw a record-breaking 40 inches (102 cm) of snow, which caused severe travel headaches, as the system was predicted to bring only a maximum of 20 inches (51 cm) to the southern region of the state. A travel ban was issued in Broome County, New York. Albany saw 22.9 inches (58 cm) of snow. This became the 8th largest snowstorm in Albany, and the 4th largest in the month of December. One fatality occurred in the area along Interstate 787 when a tractor-trailer crashed into a snowplow. Ice accumulations of up to half an inch occurred in the Hudson Valley, and up to two-tenths of an inch of ice accumulated on Long Island. State police responded to more than 600 accidents and disabled vehicles overnight stuck in snow and sleet as the storm passed over, resulting in two fatal accidents. Amounts of 4–10 inches (10–25 cm) of snow and sleet fell on Long Island and the New York City area, with 10.5 inches (27 cm) of snow falling in Central Park. The sleet made the cleanup efforts particularly difficult on Long Island, due to its weight. The snowfall totals from this storm in New York City were greater than the snow total from the previous winter, which was just 4.8 inches (12 cm) of snowfall. The snowstorm led to a 19-car pileup on the Henry Hudson Parkway, resulting in six injuries and the closure of all southbound lanes on the Henry Hudson Bridge. Newark Valley saw 44 inches (110 cm) of snow, the maximum snowfall accumulation during the event.

==== New England ====
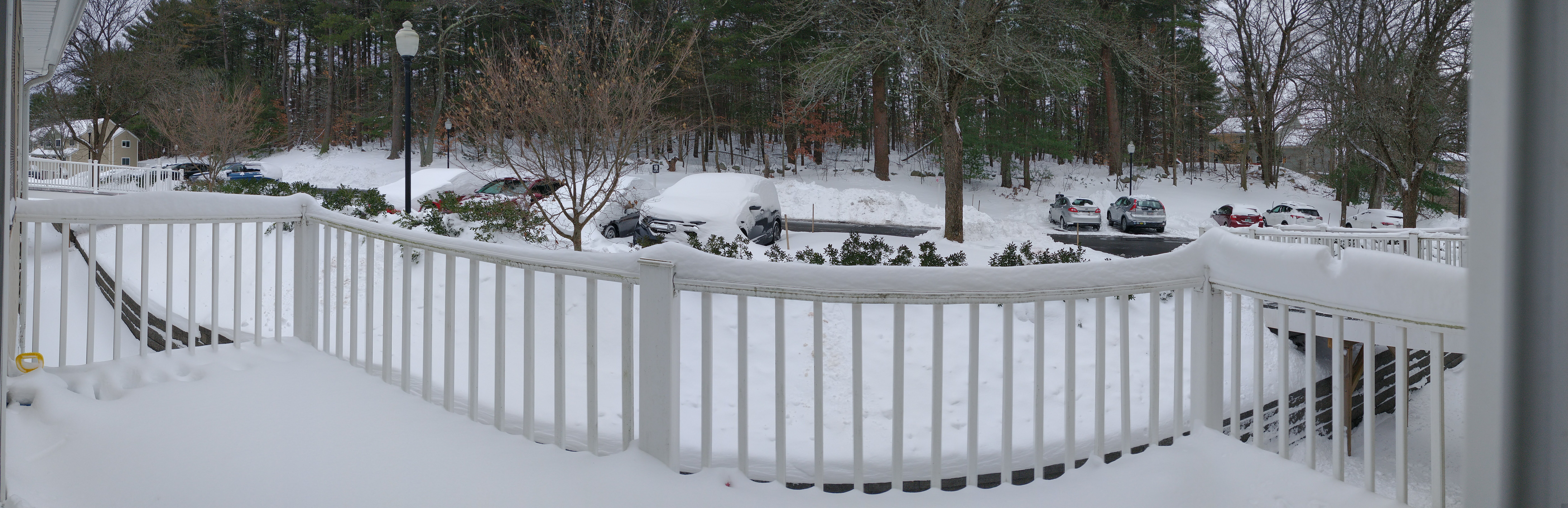
A panoramic view of 14 inches (36 cm) of snow blanketing Lexington, MA on December 18, 2020

The greatest snow totals in the state of Connecticut were reported in Fairfield and Litchfield Counties in the western part of the state, where up to 15 inches (38 cm) of snow fell. Snow totals ranged between 6 inches along coastal southeastern Connecticut to over a foot over interior sections of central and eastern Connecticut.

The greatest snowfall total in Massachusetts was in the town of Florida, where 24 inches (61 cm) of snow were recorded. Snowfall totals of at least 8 inches (20 cm) were recorded in most of the state, with the exception of Cape Cod. The heaviest snowfall was in the northwestern portion of Massachusetts. Boston set a record one-day snowfall accumulation on December 17, where 12.7 inches (32 cm) of snow was recorded from the nor'easter. Near-blizzard conditions were reported across areas of Massachusetts. Further north in Concord, New Hampshire, a one day snowfall record was set, with 24.2 inches (61 cm) of snow.

=== Snowfall totals ===
Highest observed snow totals from each affected state
State	Town	Amount
New York	Newark Valley	44 inches (110 cm)
New Hampshire	Croydon	44 inches (110 cm)
Pennsylvania	Alba	43.3 inches (110 cm)
Vermont	Landgrove	42 inches (110 cm)
Maine	Acton	28 inches (71 cm)
Massachusetts	Florida	24 inches (61 cm)
Connecticut	Winsted	16.5 inches (42 cm)
Rhode Island	Glocester	14 inches (36 cm)
New Jersey	Highland Lakes	12.3 inches (31 cm)
Maryland	Sabillasville	12 inches (30 cm)
West Virginia	Hambleton	12 inches (30 cm)
Virginia	Basye	11.5 inches (29 cm)
Ohio	Bridgeport	7.5 inches (19 cm)
Delaware	Talleyville	5.7 inches (14 cm)
Indiana	Tipton	5 inches (13 cm)
District of Columbia	Washington	2.3 inches (5.8 cm)

=== Atlantic Canada ===
==== Nova Scotia ====
On December 17–18, as the nor'easter passed to the south of the province, winter weather caused various delays and closures, particularly in the Provincial capital, Halifax, where schools, government offices, recreational programs and public parks had delayed openings after 20 centimetres (7.9 in) of snow fell. In Annapolis county and the South Shore, the snow was disruptive enough to close schools for the day. A bus in Laurencetown drove off the road, although the student aboard and driver weren't injured. Many parents were worried about their children's safety, preferring they stay home for the day. According to local police, traffic was lighter than usual and very few collisions were reported as residents took the storm seriously.

== Confirmed tornadoes ==
Confirmed tornadoes by Enhanced Fujita rating
EFU	EF0	EF1	EF2	EF3	EF4	EF5	Total
0	0	1	1	0	0	0	2

=== December 16 event ===
List of confirmed tornadoes – Wednesday, December 16, 2020 (Note: All dates are based on the local time zone where the tornado touched down; however, all times are in Coordinated Universal Time for consistency.)
EF#	Location	County / Parish	State	Start Coord.	Time (UTC)	Path length	Max width
EF2	NE of Seminole to SSW of Tampa International Airport	Pinellas, Hillsborough	FL	27.8637°N 82.7524°W	20:49-21:11	13.1 mi (21.1 km)	300 yd (270 m)
EF2	Two buildings were destroyed, and five had major damage. At a boat storage facility, 2-ton boats were tossed, and the buildings they were housed in had major damage. As the tornado approached US 19, damage became spottier. Insulation from buildings collected along a fence near the St. Pete–Clearwater International Airport. The tornado crossed I-275 on the Howard Frankland Bridge. Video from social media showed the tornado bending a light pole. Damage was $16 million.						
EF1	N of Plant City to Gibsonia	Hillsborough, Polk	FL	28.061°N 82.1662°W	21:53-22:15	12.9 mi (20.8 km)	250 yd (230 m)
EF1	A home was damaged in North Lakeland, just north of Lake Gibson. Two small barns were destroyed. Video posted on social media of this tornado showed the tornado as a "wedge". Most damage was done to trees as the tornado's rotation stayed elevated for most of its path. Damage was $280,000.						

== See also ==
- December 2009 North American blizzard
- December 2010 North American blizzard
- December 17–22, 2012 North American blizzard
- January 2016 United States blizzard
- January 31 – February 3, 2021 nor'easter
