= Heavy snow warning =

Type of weather warning

A heavy snow warning is a hazardous weather statement issued by the Weather Forecast Offices of the National Weather Service (NWS) in the United States which indicates a high rate of snowfall was occurring or was forecast to occur. Generally, the warning was issued for snowfall rates of 6 inches (15 cm) or more in 12 hours, or 8 inches (20 cm) or more in 24 hours.

This warning was discontinued beginning with the 2008–09 winter storm season, replaced by the winter storm warning for heavy snow.

In Canada, comparable warnings were issued by Environment Canada through the Meteorological Service of Canada (MSC).

== Example of a heavy snow warning ==
URGENT - WINTER WEATHER MESSAGE
NATIONAL WEATHER SERVICE FAIRBANKS AK
221 PM AST SUN DEC 9 2007

.A STORM SYSTEM MOVING NORTH OVER THE CENTRAL BERING SEA WILL MOVE
TO SOUTHWEST OF SAINT LAWRENCE ISLAND MONDAY AFTERNOON. THE STORM
WILL BRING SNOW AND EAST WINDS OF 30 TO 45 MPH TONIGHT OVER MUCH
OF WESTERN ALASKA FROM THE YUKON DELTA TO THE SEWARD PENINSULA
TONIGHT. WINDS WILL DIMINISH EARLY MONDAY BUT SNOW IS EXPECTED TO
CONTINUE THROUGH MONDAY AFTERNOON.

AKZ212-100600-
/X.CON.PAFG.HS.W.0011.071210T0000Z-071211T0200Z/
EASTERN NORTON SOUND AND NULATO HILLS-
INCLUDING...UNALAKLEET...STEBBINS...ST MICHAEL...ELIM...KOYUK...
SHAKTOOLIK
221 PM AST SUN DEC 9 2007

...HEAVY SNOW WARNING REMAINS IN EFFECT UNTIL 5 PM AST MONDAY...

A HEAVY SNOW WARNING REMAINS IN EFFECT UNTIL 5 PM AST MONDAY.

SNOW WILL SPREAD INTO THE AREA SOUTH OF UNALAKLEET THIS
AFTERNOON...AND WILL SPREAD NORTH TONIGHT...AND CONTINUE INTO
MONDAY. SNOWFALL ACCUMULATION OF 6 TO 10 INCHES ARE EXPECTED WITH
HIGHEST AMOUNTS ACROSS THE NULATO HILLS. EAST WINDS WILL INCREASE
TONIGHT TO 25 TO 35 MPH AND SOME VISIBILITIES WILL BE REDUCED TO
ONE-QUARTER MILE AT TIMES IN BLOWING SNOW.

A HEAVY SNOW WARNING MEANS HAZARDOUS WINTER WEATHER IS EXPECTED.
THE ACCUMULATION OF NEW SNOW WILL MAKE TRAVEL DIFFICULT.

$$

== See also ==
- Severe weather terminology (Canada)
- Severe weather terminology (United States)
- Winter storm
