= Winter storm watch =

U.S. National Weather Service alert

A winter storm watch is a warning in the United States issued by the National Weather Service when there is a possibility of heavy snow or potential of significant ice accumulations at least 24 hours before a storm that has a risk of being hazardous.

== Description ==
The watch is typically issued 12 to 48 hours before the storm's expected arrival in the given area.

As the event of the storm draws nearer in time and confidence in the occurrence of significant winter weather conditions and accumulation is increased, the weather watch will be upgraded to a winter storm warning or blizzard warning, depending on whether blizzard conditions will be met. If there is considerable confidence in significant ice accumulations with little to no snow, the watch will be upgraded to an ice storm warning. When confidence increases in the occurrence of winter like conditions that are not expected to reach warning or other winter criteria, a winter weather advisory will be issued instead.

A watch could be discontinued altogether if neither warning nor advisory-level conditions are expected to be met and when the possibility of a winter storm fades. Generally, a watch is not issued when only advisory-level conditions are expected. Watches generally go into effect when the chance of meeting warning criteria ranges from 50% to 80% of snow.

The following is an example of a Snowstorm Watch issued by the National Weather Service Office in Pleasent hill, MO

URGENT - WINTER WEATHER MESSAGE National Weather Service Hanford CA 150 AM PDT Mon Apr 20 2026

CAZ323-326>328-330-201715- /O.CON.KHNX.WS.A.0004.260421T0900Z-260423T0000Z/ Yosemite NP outside of the valley-Upper San Joaquin River-Kaiser to Rodgers Ridge-Kings Canyon NP-Sequoia NP- Including the cities of Wawona, Shaver Lake, Lake Thomas Edison, Cedar Grove, Devils Postpile, Tuolumne Meadows, Florence Lake, Lodgepole, Huntington Lake, Giant Forest, and Lake Wishon 150 AM PDT Mon Apr 20 2026

...WINTER STORM WATCH REMAINS IN EFFECT FROM LATE TONIGHT THROUGH WEDNESDAY AFTERNOON...

* WHAT...Heavy snow possible. Total snow accumulations 3 to 5 inches above 7,000 feet, with 12 to 18 inches possible at the highest elevations of the Sierra Nevada. Winds could gust as high as 75 mph along the Sierra crest.

* WHERE...Kaiser to Rodgers Ridge, Kings Canyon NP, Sequoia NP, Upper San Joaquin River, and Yosemite NP outside of the valley.

* WHEN...From late tonight through Wednesday afternoon.

* IMPACTS...Roads, and especially bridges and overpasses, will likely become slick and hazardous. Visibilities may drop below 1/4 mile due to falling and blowing snow. Travel could be very difficult to impossible. The hazardous conditions could impact the Tuesday morning and evening commutes. Strong winds could cause tree damage.

PRECAUTIONARY/PREPAREDNESS ACTIONS...

Monitor the latest forecasts for updates on this situation.

Persons are urged to stay indoors until conditions improve. If you must go outside, dress in layers. Several layers of clothes will keep you warmer than a single heavy coat. Cover exposed skin to reduce your risk of frostbite or hypothermia. Gloves, a scarf, and a hat will keep you from losing your body heat.

Persons should delay all travel if possible. If travel is absolutely necessary, drive with extreme caution and be prepared for sudden changes in visibility. Leave plenty of room between you and the motorist ahead of you, and allow extra time to reach your destination. Avoid sudden braking or acceleration, and be especially cautious on hills or when making turns. Make sure your car is winterized and in good working order.

&&

$$

CMolina

== See also ==
- Severe weather terminology (United States)
