= Blizzard warning =

Weather warning indicating blizzard conditions in the warned area

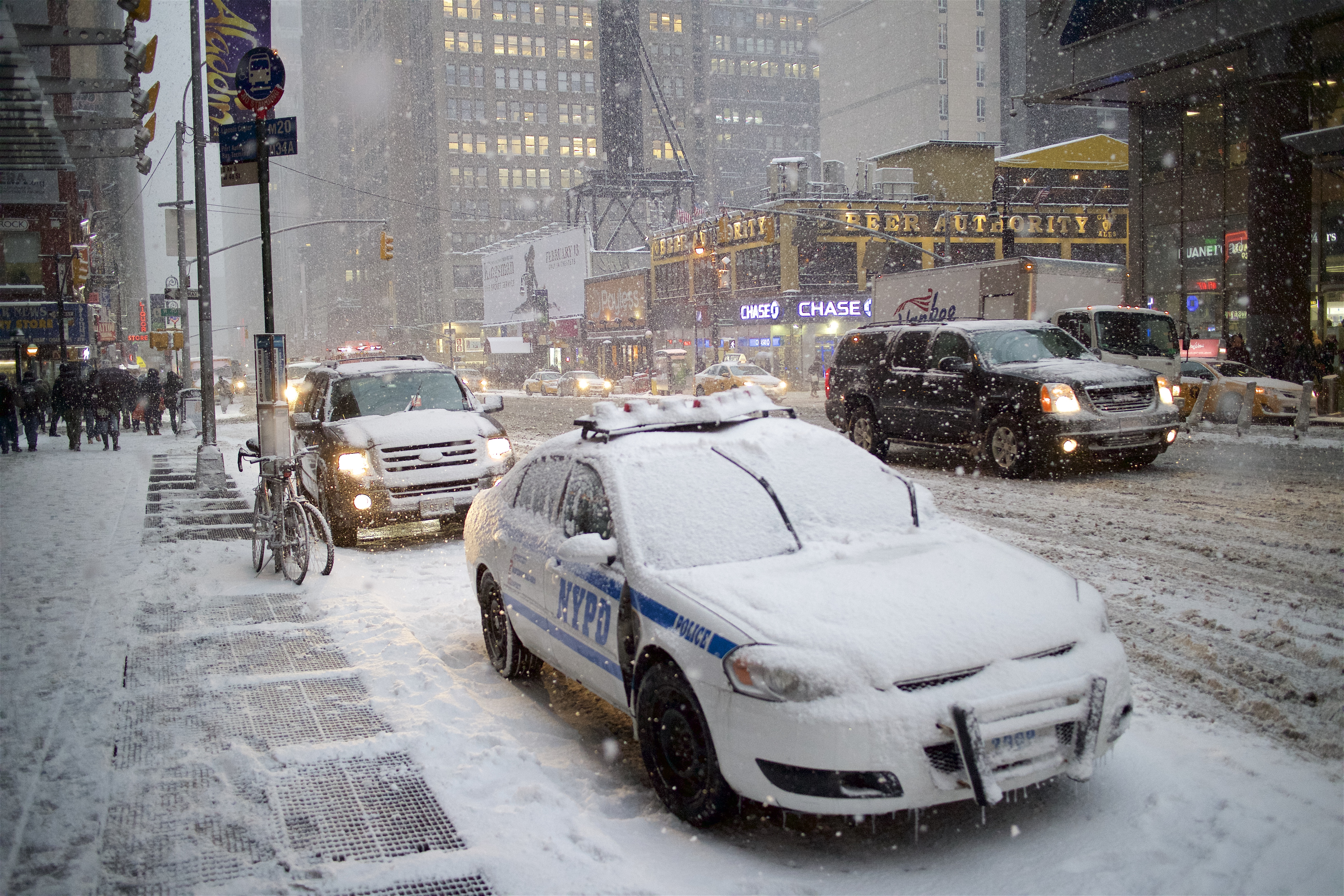
New York City police and Office of Emergency Management vehicles parked near Times Square in New York City during a 2015 blizzard warning.

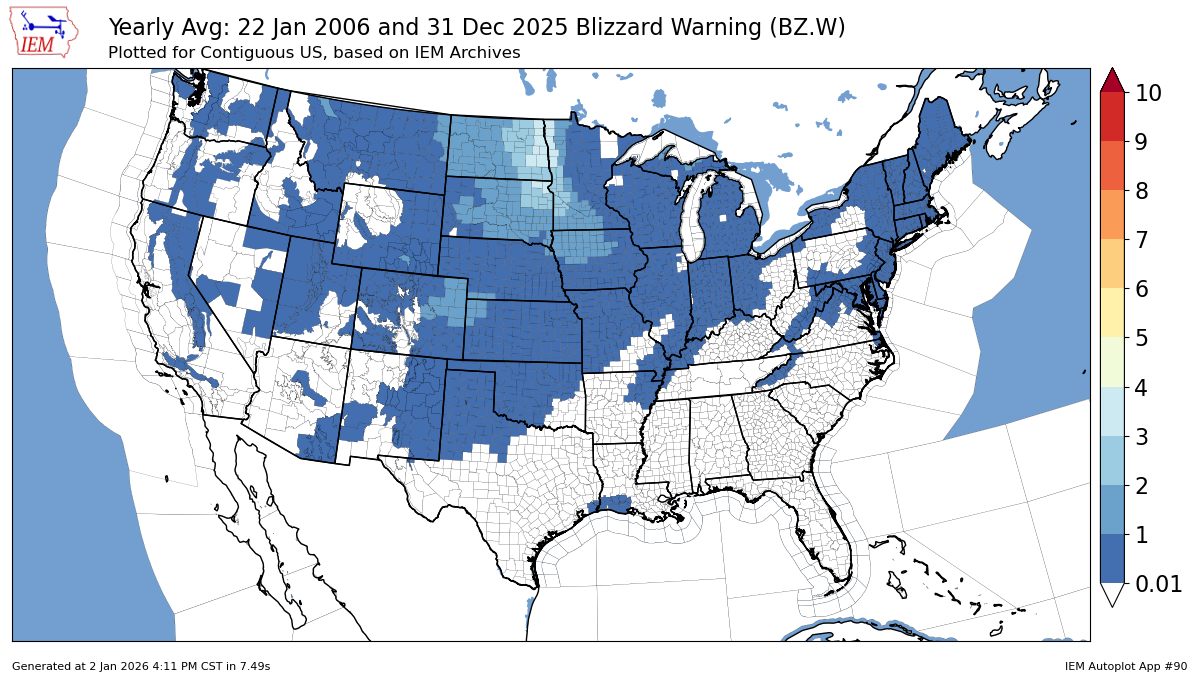
Map of average annual blizzard warnings in the United States between 2006 and 2025.

A blizzard warning (SAME code: BZW) is a hazardous weather statement issued by Weather Forecast Offices (WFO) of the National Weather Service (NWS) in the United States, which indicates heavy snowfall accompanied by sustained winds or frequent gusts of 35 mph (56 km/h) or greater are forecast to occur for a minimum of three hours. A blizzard tends to reduce visibilities to 1/4 mile (400 m) or less.

A severe blizzard warning is a variation issued in some cases of winds above 45 mph (72 km/h) and temperatures below 10 °F (−12 °C). Most local weather offices will activate and broadcast the SAME alarm tone on relevant NOAA Weather Radio stations for both varieties of warning. When the Wireless Emergency Alerts system was launched in 2012, blizzard warnings were initially sent as alerts to mobile phones; this practice was discontinued in November 2013.

In Canada, comparable warnings are issued by Environment and Climate Change Canada through the Meteorological Service of Canada (MSC). As of 2010, blizzard warnings issued by local MSC forecast offices are based on sets of regionally determined criteria:

- National warning below tree line – warning requires sustained winds of 40 km/h (25 mph) or greater with widespread reductions in visibility to 400 m (0.25 mi) or less from blowing snow or a combination of blowing and falling snow to occur at least four hours.
- Northern (Arctic) warning above tree line – criteria are the same as national warning but for blizzard conditions forecast to occur for at least six hours.

The warnings are relayed by Weatheradio Canada and media outlets like The Weather Network.

== Example of a blizzard warning (US) ==
A blizzard warning in California
An example of a blizzard warning issued in Lake Tahoe

The following is an example of a blizzard warning issued by the National Weather Service Office in Duluth, Minnesota.

028
WWUS43 KDLH 040931
WSWDLH

URGENT - WINTER WEATHER MESSAGE
National Weather Service Duluth MN
331 AM CST Sat Dec 4 2021

MNZ021-042145-
/O.UPG.KDLH.WS.A.0005.211205T0600Z-211206T1200Z/
/O.NEW.KDLH.BZ.W.0001.211205T1100Z-211206T1200Z/
Southern Cook-
Including the city of Grand Marais
331 AM CST Sat Dec 4 2021

...BLIZZARD WARNING IN EFFECT FROM 5 AM SUNDAY TO 6 AM CST
MONDAY...

* WHAT...Blizzard conditions expected. Total snow accumulations
  of 10 to 16 inches. Winds gusting as high as 40 mph.

* WHERE...Southern Cook County. This includes the Tribal Lands
  of the Grand Portage Reservation.

* WHEN...From 5 AM Sunday to 6 AM CST Monday.

* IMPACTS...Travel could be very difficult to impossible. Patchy
  blowing snow could significantly reduce visibility.

* ADDITIONAL DETAILS...The worst conditions should be during the
  day on Sunday.

PRECAUTIONARY/PREPAREDNESS ACTIONS...

Travel should be restricted to emergencies only. If you must
travel, have a winter survival kit with you. If you get stranded,
stay with your vehicle.

The latest road conditions can be obtained by calling 5 1 1.
Road conditions can also be found at 511mn.org for Minnesota or
511wi.gov for Wisconsin.

&&

$$

== Example of a blizzard warning (Canada) ==
9:19 AM EST Monday 17 January 2022
Blizzard warning in effect for:

    City of Toronto

Blizzard conditions are occurring.

Hazards:
Hazardous blizzard conditions with heavy snow and strong winds resulting in widespread near zero visibilities.
Total snowfall amounts of 40 to 60 cm.
Heavy snow with peak snowfall rates of 8 to 10 cm per hour this morning.
Blowing snow due to winds gusting up to 60 km/h.

When: Now through this evening. Worst conditions expected between now until 11:00 A.M. EST.

Discussion: A low pressure system tracking south of the Great Lakes is currently bringing significant snowfall and blizzard conditions to the region. This will significantly impact the commute this morning.

Impacts:

Travel is expected to be extremely hazardous due to widespread poor visibility. Travel is expected to be very difficult or impossible due to near-zero visibility. There may be a significant impact on rush hour traffic in urban areas. There may be a significant impact on rush hour traffic in urban areas. If you become stranded in a vehicle do not leave. The vehicle offers a form of protection from the cold. A single person walking through the snow is harder to find than a stranded car or truck. If you do travel and become lost, remain where you are until the blizzard has passed. Protect yourself from wind, cold and disorientation by staying sheltered, indoors or with your vehicle.

Please continue to monitor alerts and forecasts issued by Environment Canada. To report severe weather, send an email to ONstorm or tweet reports using #ONStorm.

== See also ==
- Blizzard watch
- Winter storm warning
- Severe weather terminology (United States)
