= Ice storm warning =

Weather warning for freezing rain and ice accumulation

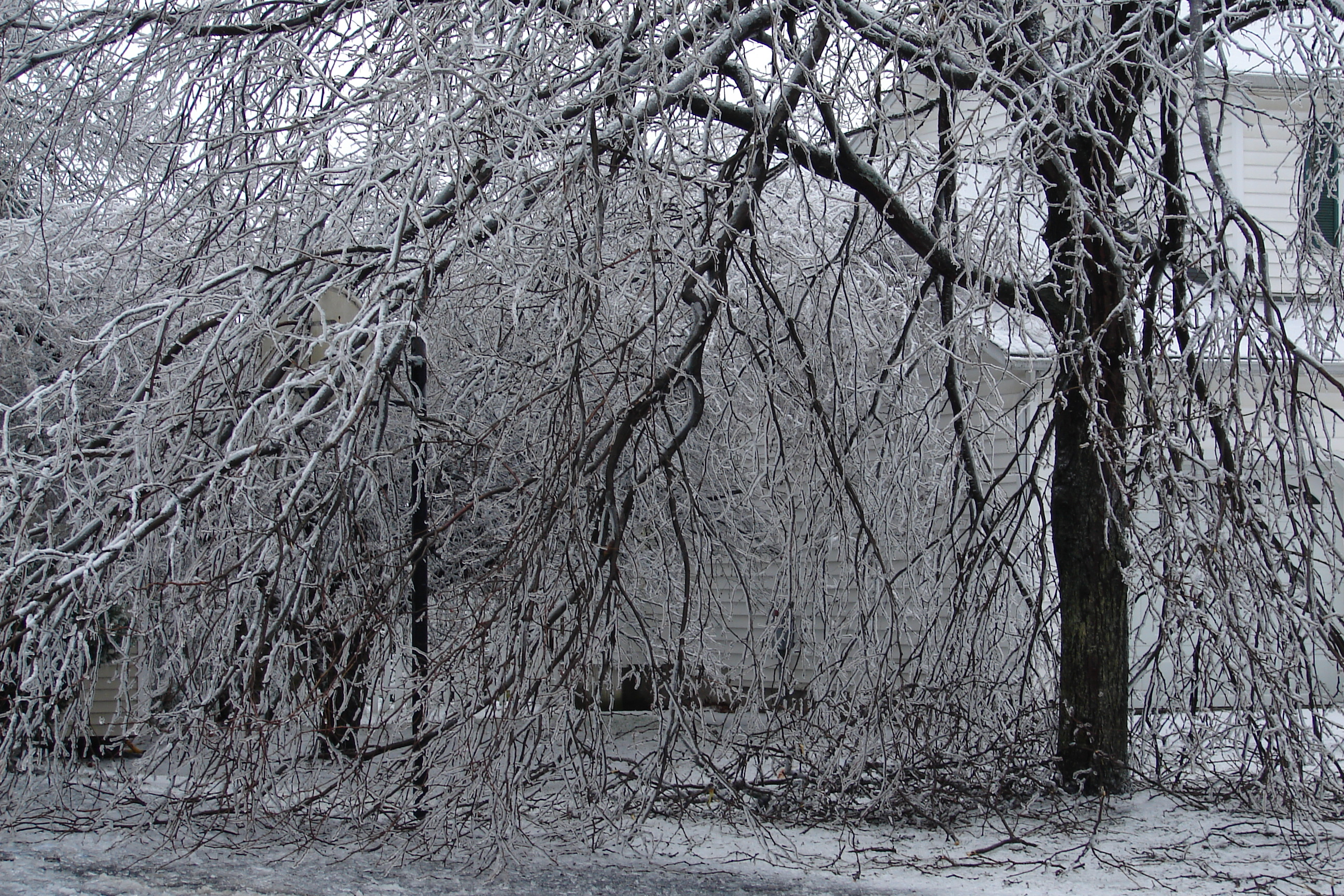
Trees with Ice

An ice storm warning is a hazardous weather statement issued by the Weather Forecast Offices of the National Weather Service in the United States which indicates that freezing rain produces a significant and possibly damaging accumulation of ice on surfaces. The criteria for this warning vary from state to state, but typically an ice storm warning will be issued any time more than 1/4 inch (6.4 mm) of ice at peak is expected to accumulate in an area, else a freezing rain or drizzle advisory is issued; in some areas, the criterion is 1/2 inch (13 mm) instead.

== Example of an ice storm warning ==
617 
WWUS44 KMEG 221736
WSWMEG

URGENT - WINTER WEATHER MESSAGE
National Weather Service Memphis TN
1136 AM CST Thu Jan 22 2026

MSZ002>006-008-009-011>017-020>024-TNZ053>055-090>092-231230-
/O.UPG.KMEG.WS.A.0001.260123T1800Z-260126T0000Z/
/O.NEW.KMEG.IS.W.0001.260124T0000Z-260126T0000Z/
Marshall-Benton MS-Tippah-Alcorn-Tishomingo-Tate-Prentiss-Quitman-
Panola-Lafayette-Union-Pontotoc-Lee MS-Itawamba-Tallahatchie-
Yalobusha-Calhoun-Chickasaw-Monroe-Chester-Henderson-Decatur-
Hardeman-McNairy-Hardin-
Including the cities of Ripley MS, Henderson, Water Valley,
Coffeeville, New Albany, Oxford, Bolivar, Aberdeen, Amory,
Houston, Savannah, Iuka, Booneville, Holly Springs, Pontotoc,
Selmer, Marks, Ashland, Okolona, Fulton, Bruce, Senatobia,
Corinth, Batesville, Tupelo, Calhoun City, Charleston, Lexington,
Parsons, and Decaturville
1136 AM CST Thu Jan 22 2026

...ICE STORM WARNING IN EFFECT FROM 6 PM FRIDAY TO 6 PM CST SUNDAY...

* WHAT...Significant icing expected. Total snow and sleet 
  accumulations between 1 and 3 inches and ice accumulations between 
  one half and one inch.

* WHERE...Portions of North Mississippi and West Tennessee.

* WHEN...From 6 PM Friday to 6 PM CST Sunday.

* IMPACTS...Expect power outages that last more than a day and 
  extensive tree damage due to the ice. Travel could be impossible. 
  The hazardous conditions could impact the Friday evening commute.

PRECAUTIONARY/PREPAREDNESS ACTIONS...

Travel should be restricted to emergencies only. Prepare for 
extended power outages. The latest road conditions for the state you 
are calling from can be obtained by calling 5 1 1.

&&

$$

== See also ==
- Severe weather terminology (United States)
- Severe weather terminology (Canada)
