= Winter storm warning =

Type of weather warning

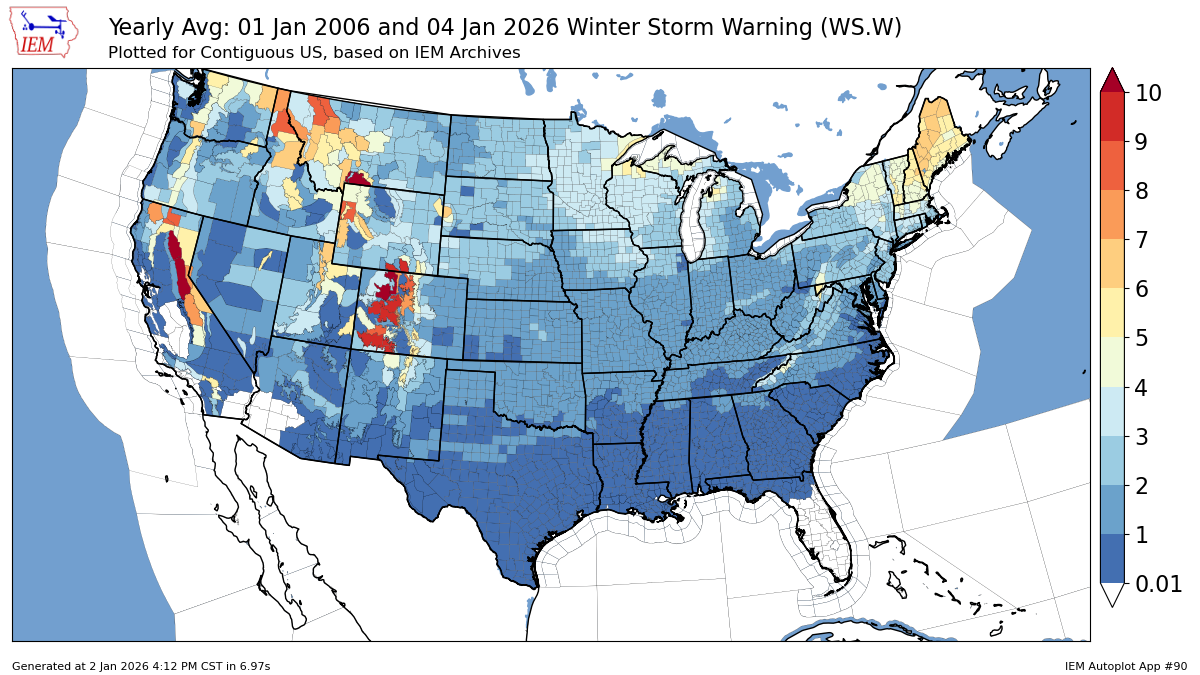
Map of average annual winter storm warnings in the United States between 2006 and 2026.

A winter storm warning (SAME code: WSW) is a hazardous weather statement issued by Weather Forecast Offices (WFO) of the National Weather Service (NWS) in the United States to alert the public that a winter storm is occurring or is about to occur in the area, usually within 36 hours of the storm's onset.

A similar warning is issued by Environment and Climate Change Canada (ECCC) through local forecast offices of the Meteorological Service of Canada.

== Definition ==
Generally, a Winter Storm Warning is issued if the following criteria, at minimum, are forecast: snow accumulations usually between or greater than 4 to 7 inches (10 to 18 cm), or snow accumulations of usually three inches (7.6 cm) or more with significant accumulation of ice (sleet or freezing rain). In the Southern United States, where severe winter weather is much less common and any snow is a more significant event, warning criteria are lower, as low as one inch (2.5 cm) in the southernmost areas: as one goes from north to south, the accumulation estimates needed to meet warning criteria lessen. A warning can also be issued during high impact events of lesser amounts, usually early or very late in the season when trees have leaves and damage can result.

Winter Storm Warnings for snow events are issued when winds are less than 35 mph (56 km/h); if the storm is expected to produce winds above this speed for at least three hours accompanying moderate to heavy snowfall, a blizzard warning will be issued instead or as an upgrade to the winter storm warning. Usually, a large accumulation of ice alone with little to no snow will result in an ice storm warning, or in the case of light freezing rain, a winter weather advisory, a freezing rain advisory, or a freezing drizzle advisory. In lieu of issuing such a statement separately, Winter Storm Warnings can include verbiage indicative of a wind chill advisory or a wind chill warning, if potentially life-threatening wind chill values (determined by local criteria) are forecast to accompany winter precipitation during the warning's duration.

Beginning with the 2008–09 meteorological winter, the National Weather Service consolidated individual precipitation-specific bulletins for winter storms expected to create heavy snowfall (heavy snow warning), lake-effect snow (lake effect snow warning) or sleet accumulations (sleet warning or heavy sleet warning) within the warned area, replacing them with variants of the Winter Storm Warning product outlining the accordant hazards being forecast:

Winter storm warning for heavy snow
Replaced the heavy snow warning
Winter storm warning for heavy wet snow
Same as above, except when the snow will also be wet
Winter storm warning for heavy snow and blowing snow
When the criteria for both a WSW for heavy snow and a winter weather advisory for snow and blowing snow are met [near-blizzard conditions]
Winter storm warning for heavy sleet
Replaced the sleet warning
Winter storm warning for heavy snow and ice
When both the criteria for a WSW for heavy snow and an ice storm warning are met
Winter storm warning for snow and ice
When both the criteria for a winter weather advisory for snow and an ice storm warning are met
Winter storm warning for sleet and freezing rain
When both the criteria for a winter weather advisory for sleet and an ice storm warning are met
Winter storm warning for heavy lake-effect snow
Replaced the lake effect snow warning in some NWS county warning areas. (2017-2018 season)

Additionally, all of the above warning types may also include verbiage indicative of a wind advisory to indicate strong winds that are expected to accompany the precipitation (e.g., "winter storm warning for heavy wet snow and strong winds").

The generic "winter storm warning" terminology may be used on its own, typically to indicate that all types of winter precipitation (as a mixture or in periods before transitioning between types) are expected in high amounts; however, it may be defined generically at the forecaster's discretion regardless of whether or not this condition is met.

Environment Canada also tones blowing snow warnings, freezing drizzle warnings, freezing rain warnings, snowfall warnings, and snow squall warnings as Winter Storm Warnings.

== Example of a winter storm warning ==
Winter Storm Warning for Northwest Minnesota
An example of a winter storm warning Emergency Alert System activation being issued in Norman County on 25 December 2023 at 7:18 PM CST.

596 
WWUS44 KLIX 192043
WSWLIX

URGENT - WINTER WEATHER MESSAGE
National Weather Service New Orleans LA
243 PM CST Sun Jan 19 2025

LAZ034>037-039-046>048-056>060-064-065-070-071-076>090-MSZ068>071-
077-083>088-200445-
/O.UPG.KLIX.WS.A.0001.250121T0600Z-250122T0600Z/
/O.NEW.KLIX.WS.W.0001.250121T0600Z-250122T0600Z/
Pointe Coupee-West Feliciana-East Feliciana-St. Helena-Washington-
Iberville-West Baton Rouge-East Baton Rouge-Assumption-St. James-
St. John The Baptist-Upper Lafourche-St. Charles-Upper St.
Bernard-Upper Terrebonne-Lower St. Bernard-Northern Tangipahoa-
Southeast St. Tammany-Western Orleans-Eastern Orleans-Northern
St. Tammany-Southwestern St. Tammany-Central Tangipahoa-Lower
Tangipahoa-Northern Livingston-Southern Livingston-Western
Ascension-Eastern Ascension-Upper Jefferson-Lower Jefferson-Upper
Plaquemines-Central Plaquemines-Wilkinson-Amite-Pike-Walthall-
Pearl River-Northern Hancock-Northern Harrison-Northern Jackson-
Southern Hancock-Southern Harrison-Southern Jackson-
Including the cities of Escatawpa, Port Allen, Laplace, Jean
Lafitte, Saucier, Chalmette, Tickfaw, Prairieville, Sellers,
Centreville, Independence, Donaldsonville, Marrero, Labadieville,
Gulfport, Franklinton, New Roads, Sorrento, Geismar, Gramercy,
Kiln, Houma, Bayou Sorrel, Thibodaux, Metairie, Pass Christian,
Bayou Cane, Salem, Plaquemine, Tylertown, Shell Beach, Slidell,
Brusly, St. Martin, Livingston, Paincourtville, Kentwood, Moss
Point, Dolorosa, Wade, Westwego, Bogalusa, Jackson, Livonia,
Greensburg, Norco, Montpelier, Gautier, Harahan, Necaise, Gretna,
Roseland, Amite, Denham Springs, Picayune, Pascagoula,
Darlington, Lutcher, Lyman, Walker, McNeil, Ocean Springs, Baton
Rouge, Meraux, Delacroix, Bay St. Louis, Crossroads, Destrehan,
Poplarville, Wilmer, Felps, French Settlement, Robert, Acy,
Vancleave, Clinton, Madisonville, Braithwaite, Fort Adams,
Larose, Long Beach, Barataria, Pierre Part, Lettsworth,
Covington, Yscloskey, Belle Chasse, Smithdale, Pearlington,
Addis, White Castle, Waveland, Diamondhead, Reserve, Gonzales,
Whitehall, Akers, Spillman, Folsom, Ponchatoula, Easleyville,
Woodville, Alliance, Violet, Raceland, Convent, Killian, Gloster,
Dexter, Kenner, Biloxi, Lafitte, Enon, Gillsburg, St.
Francisville, Liberty, Mandeville, New Orleans, Bush,
Springfield, McComb, Hammond, East New Orleans, and Wakefield
243 PM CST Sun Jan 19 2025

...WINTER STORM WARNING IN EFFECT FROM MIDNIGHT MONDAY NIGHT TO 
MIDNIGHT CST TUESDAY NIGHT...

* WHAT...Winter precipitation causing moderate to major impacts is 
  expected. Snow accumulations of 3 to 6 inches along and north of 
  the I-10 and I-12 corridor and 1 to 3 inches south of this 
  corridor. There is also a low chance of light ice accumulations 
  along and south of this line.

* WHERE...Portions of southeast Louisiana and southern Mississippi.

* WHEN...From midnight Monday Night to midnight CST Tuesday Night.

* IMPACTS...Roads, and especially bridges and overpasses, will 
  likely become slick and hazardous. Plan on slippery road 
  conditions. The hazardous conditions could impact the Tuesday 
  morning and evening commutes.

PRECAUTIONARY/PREPAREDNESS ACTIONS...

If you must travel, keep an extra flashlight, food, and water in 
your vehicle in case of an emergency. The latest road conditions for 
the state you are calling from can be obtained by calling 5 1 1.

Consider delaying all travel. If travel is absolutely necessary, 
drive with extreme caution. Consider taking a winter storm kit along 
with you, including such items as tire chains, booster cables, 
flashlight, shovel, blankets and extra clothing. Also take water, a 
first aid kit, and anything else that would help you survive in case 
you become stranded.

&&

$$

HRL/TJS

== See also ==
Severe weather terminology (United States)
