= Winter weather advisory =

Severe weather statement in the United States

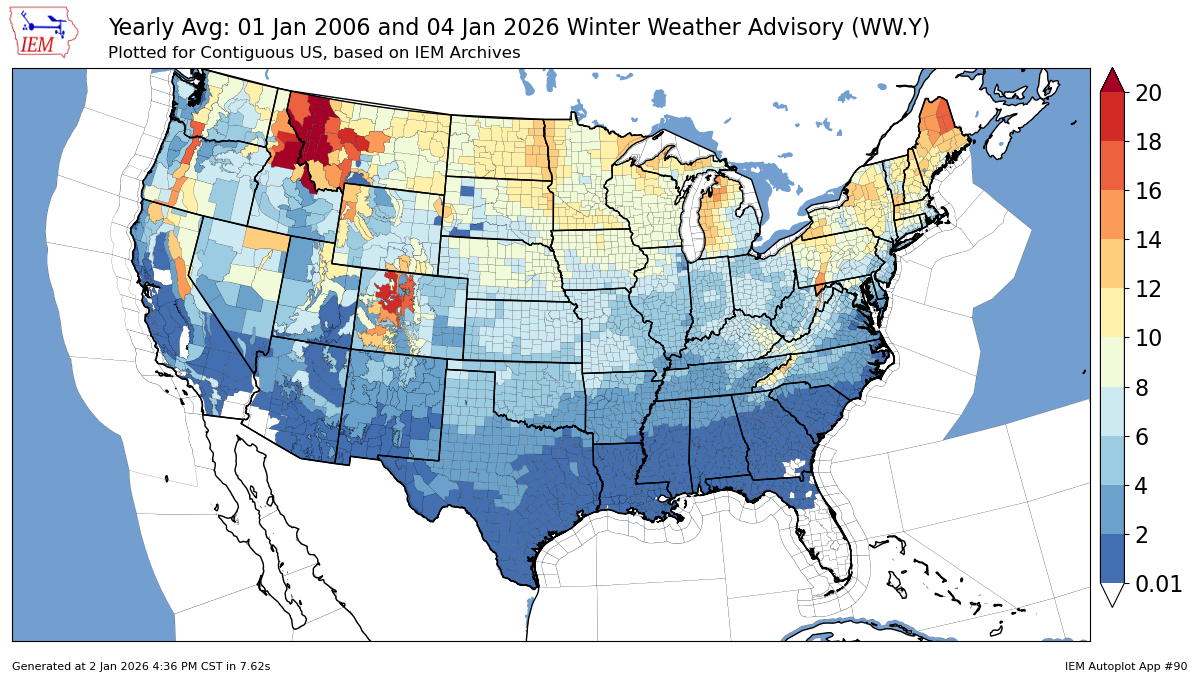
Map of average annual winter weather advisories in the United States between 2006 and 2026.

A winter weather advisory (originally identified as a Traveler's Advisory until the 2002-03 climatological winter when officially renamed, and informally as such by some local television stations thereafter) is a hazardous weather statement issued by local Weather Forecast Offices (WFO) of the National Weather Service in the United States when one or more types of winter precipitation—snow, rain and snow mixed, freezing rain, sleet, graupel, etc.—presenting a hazard, but not expected to produce accumulations meeting storm warning criteria (usually below four inches (10 cm)), are forecast within 36 hours of the expected onset of precipitation or are occurring in the advisory's coverage area.

== Definition ==
In the United States, the criteria necessary to issue a Winter Weather Advisory is defined by each local NWS Weather Forecast Office, and is based on the climatological impact of frozen precipitation on travel and commerce within the specified region. For example, any measurable snow will constitute the advisory in Florida, while forecast accumulations of three to five inches (7.6 to 12.7 cm) will merit issuance in New England. If other forms of wintry precipitation are expected, then a Winter Weather Advisory or Winter Storm Warning (the latter being issued for frozen precipitation events portending amounts significant enough to cause hazardous conditions for life, property, commerce and travel) can be issued, also depending on the amount and accumulation of precipitation that is expected.

Until the 2007-08 winter storm season, the product was originally designated to indicate hazardous travel conditions within the advisory area, while standalone advisories based on the expected/ongoing precipitation type (usually encompassing the same areas) were issued to indicate hazards to life, property and commerce through the duration of the winter weather event forecast to occur within a given region. Beginning in the winter of 2008-09, the National Weather Service restructured the Winter Weather Advisory into a general purpose product, expanding its application to supersede and utilizing the respective criterial definitions previously applied to four deprecated precipitation-specific products:

- Winter Weather Advisory for Snow (replaced the Snow Advisory) – issued for synoptic-scale snowfall events expected to produce accumulations of or greater than WFO-defined minimum criteria, either within a six-hour span or through the event duration as long as amounts are less than Winter Storm Warning criteria;
- Winter Weather Advisory for Snow and Blowing Snow (replaced the Snow and Blowing Snow Advisory) – issued for snowfall events accompanied by sustained winds or frequent gusts of 25 to 34 mph (40 to 55 km/h) that may occasionally reduce visibility to less than one mile for a span of at least three hours;
- Winter Weather Advisory for Blowing Snow (replaced the Blowing Snow Advisory) – issued for snowfall events accompanied by winds less than 35 mph (56 km/h) that may cause blowing and drifting of snow reducing visibilities to one mile (1.6 km) or less;
- Winter Weather Advisory for Sleet (replaced the Sleet Advisory) – issued for sleet events expected to cause ice accumulations capable of impairing vehicle and pedestrian travel;
- Winter Weather Advisory for Snow, Sleet, and Freezing Rain (replaced the generic Winter Weather Advisory) – issued for some combination thereof of frozen precipitation types

Additional variants of the product were added by the National Weather Service on October 2, 2017 (implemented for the 2017-18 winter storm season), superseding two other precipitation-based advisory products:

- Winter Weather Advisory for Freezing Rain (replaced the Freezing Rain Advisory) – issued for freezing rain or freezing drizzle events forecast to produce ice accretions of up to one-quarter inch (6.4 mm) capable of causing significant travel impairments;
- Winter Weather Advisory for Lake-effect Snow (replaced the Lake-effect Snow Advisory) – issued for lake-effect snow events forecast to produce moderate accumulations (generally three to six inches (76 to 152 mm)) over adjacent land areas and marine zones

The generic Winter Weather Advisory terminology may be used on its own, typically to indicate moderate amounts of snow, sleet and freezing rain are expected in the alert area. However, the generic term may be used at the forecaster's discretion regardless of whether or not the condition applies.

In Canada, Environment and Climate Change Canada issues the similar Winter Weather Travel Advisory through regional Meteorological Service offices based in Vancouver, Edmonton, Winnipeg, Toronto, Montreal and Dartmouth for specified municipalities and census subdivisions.

== Examples ==
=== Snow Advisory (deprecated) ===
Below is an example of a Snow Advisory for Snow issued by the National Weather Service office in Great Falls, Montana in December 2007:

URGENT - WINTER WEATHER MESSAGE
NATIONAL WEATHER SERVICE GREAT FALLS MT
657 PM MST SUN DEC 9 2007

MTZ008>015-044-045-047-048-050>055-101100-
/O.CON.KTFX.SN.Y.0025.071210T1100Z-071211T0000Z/
BEAVERHEAD-NORTHERN ROCKY MOUNTAIN FRONT-EASTERN GLACIER-HILL-
CASCADE-CHOUTEAU-CENTRAL AND SOUTHERN LEWIS AND CLARK-MADISON-
TOOLE-LIBERTY-BLAINE-SOUTHERN ROCKY MOUNTAIN FRONT-JUDITH BASIN-
FERGUS-JEFFERSON-BROADWATER-MEAGHER-GALLATIN-
INCLUDING THE CITIES OF...DILLON...BROWNING...CUT BANK...HAVRE...
GREAT FALLS...FORT BENTON...HELENA...LINCOLN...ENNIS...SHELBY...
CHESTER...CHINOOK...CHOTEAU...STANFORD...LEWISTOWN...BOULDER...
TOWNSEND...WHITE SULPHUR SPRINGS...BOZEMAN...WEST YELLOWSTONE
657 PM MST SUN DEC 9 2007

...SNOW ADVISORY REMAINS IN EFFECT FROM 4 AM TO 5 PM MST MONDAY
FOR ELEVATIONS ABOVE 4500 FEET...

A SNOW ADVISORY REMAINS IN EFFECT FROM 4 AM TO 5 PM MST MONDAY
FOR ELEVATIONS ABOVE 4500 FEET.

PERIODS OF LIGHT SNOW ARE EXPECTED TO FALL OVER THE ROCKY
MOUNTAIN FRONT...THE CENTRAL MOUNTAINS...AND ACROSS MUCH OF
SOUTHWEST MONTANA FROM MONDAY MORNING THROUGH MONDAY AFTERNOON.
EXPECT NEW SNOW ACCUMULATIONS ON MONDAY TO RANGE FROM 2 TO
6 INCHES FOR ELEVATIONS ABOVE 4500 FEET...WHILE SNOW
ACCUMULATIONS WILL GENERALLY BE LESS THAN 1 INCH AT LOWER
ELEVATIONS. AREAS OF BLOWING AND DRIFTING SNOW WILL REDUCE
VISIBILITIES AT TIMES.

A SNOW ADVISORY MEANS THAT PERIODS OF SNOW WILL CAUSE PRIMARILY
TRAVEL DIFFICULTIES. BE PREPARED FOR SNOW COVERED ROADS AND
LIMITED VISIBILITIES...AND USE CAUTION WHILE DRIVING.

LISTEN TO NOAA WEATHER RADIO...OR YOUR LOCAL MEDIA FOR THE LATEST
UPDATES ON THIS SITUATION.

$$

=== Winter Weather Advisory ===
Below is an example of a Winter Weather Advisory for Snow issued by the National Weather Service office in Jackson, Kentucky in November 2024:

813 
WWUS43 KJKL 300231
WSWJKL

URGENT - WINTER WEATHER MESSAGE
National Weather Service Jackson KY
931 PM EST Fri Nov 29 2024

KYZ044-050>052-058>060-068-069-088-104-106>120-301100-
/O.NEW.KJKL.WW.Y.0010.241201T0000Z-241202T0000Z/
Fleming-Montgomery-Bath-Rowan-Estill-Powell-Menifee-Rockcastle-
Jackson-Harlan-Elliott-Morgan-Johnson-Wolfe-Magoffin-Floyd-Lee-
Breathitt-Knott-Owsley-Perry-Clay-Leslie-Letcher-Martin-Pike-
Including the cities of Flemingsburg, Ravenna, Paintsville,
Beattyville, Annville, South Williamson, Manchester, Pippa
Passes, Owingsville, Hazard, Booneville, McKee, Hindman, Inez,
Stanton, Clay City, Hyden, Whitesburg, Brodhead, Mount Sterling,
Wheelwright, Harlan, Mount Vernon, Jackson, Jenkins, West
Liberty, Coal Run, Jeffersonville, Morehead, Pikeville,
Cumberland, Prestonsburg, Irvine, Campton, Salyersville, Sandy
Hook, Elkhorn City, Frenchburg, and Camargo
931 PM EST Fri Nov 29 2024

...WINTER WEATHER ADVISORY IN EFFECT FROM 7 PM SATURDAY TO 7 PM EST 
SUNDAY...

* WHAT...Light snow expected. Total snow accumulations of 1 to 2 
  inches.

* WHERE...Portions of eastern Kentucky.

* WHEN...From 7 PM Saturday to 7 PM EST Sunday.

* IMPACTS...Plan on slippery road conditions. 

PRECAUTIONARY/PREPAREDNESS ACTIONS...

Slow down and use caution while traveling. The latest road 
conditions for Kentucky can be found by visiting https://goky.ky.gov.

&&

$$

GREIF

== See also ==
- Severe weather terminology (United States)
- Winter storm warning
- Winter storm watch
