= Erwin Kreuz =

West German tourist (1927–2010)

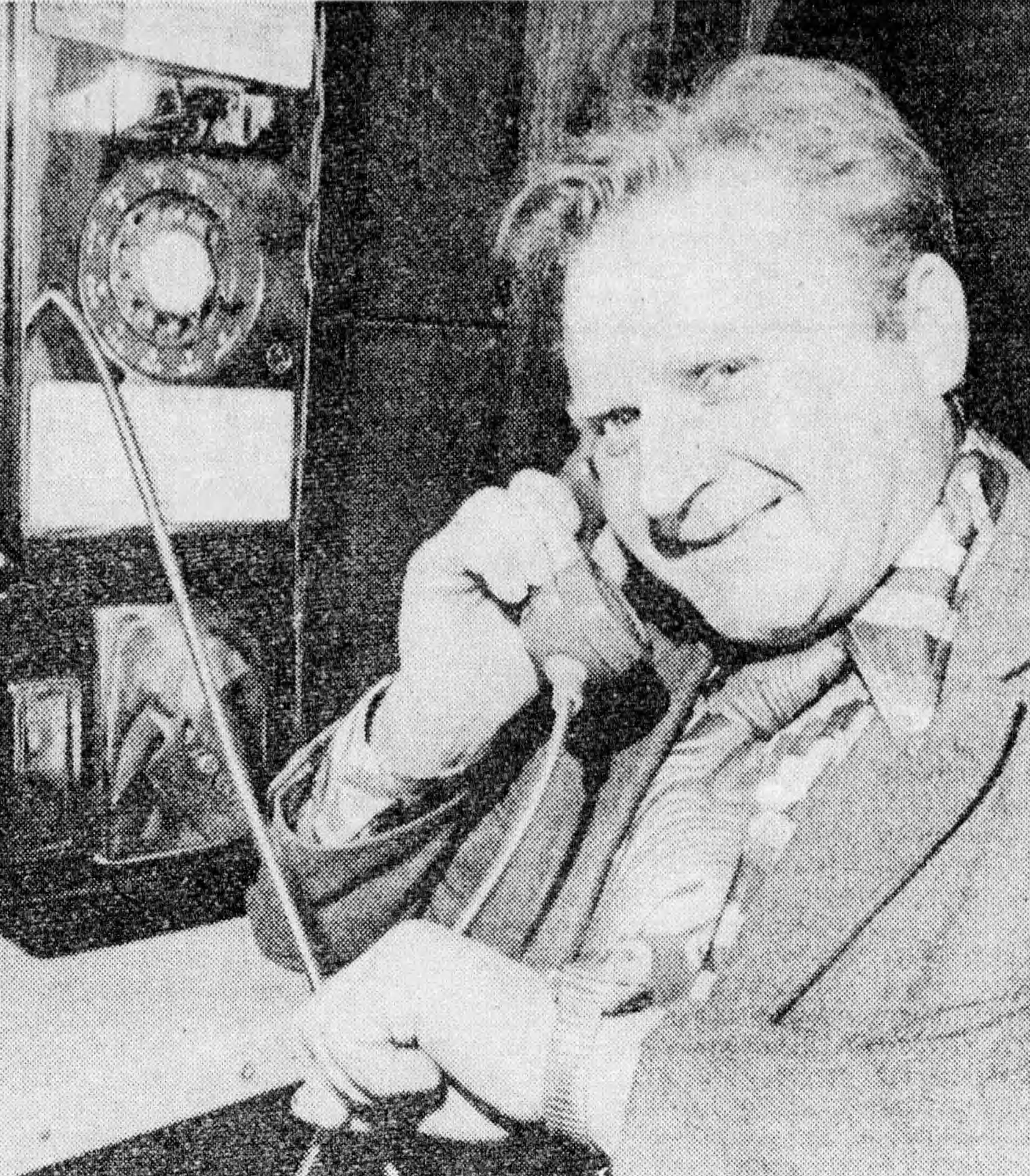
- Kreuz in 1977
- Born: October 23, 1927
- Died: 2010 (aged 82–83); Peiting, Bavaria, Germany
- Occupation: Brewery worker
- Known for: Mistaking Bangor, Maine, for San Francisco

Erwin Kreuz (1927–2010) was a West German tourist to the United States who achieved international celebrity status in the late 1970s for mistaking the city of Bangor, Maine, for San Francisco. The incident continues to be told in various media as a prominent example of an airline traveler not reaching their intended destination.

== Trips to America ==
Kreuz left East Germany as a young soldier in 1945 and settled in Bavaria. A brewery worker from Adelsried, a village near Augsburg, Kreuz spoke no English, had taken a single flight to Berlin, and except for a previous day trip to Switzerland, had never before undertaken international travel when he boarded a World Airways charter flight from Germany to San Francisco on October 3, 1977. At the time of the trip, his only immediate family were two sisters living in Germany, and he was living alone as a bachelor.

=== Original incident (1977) ===
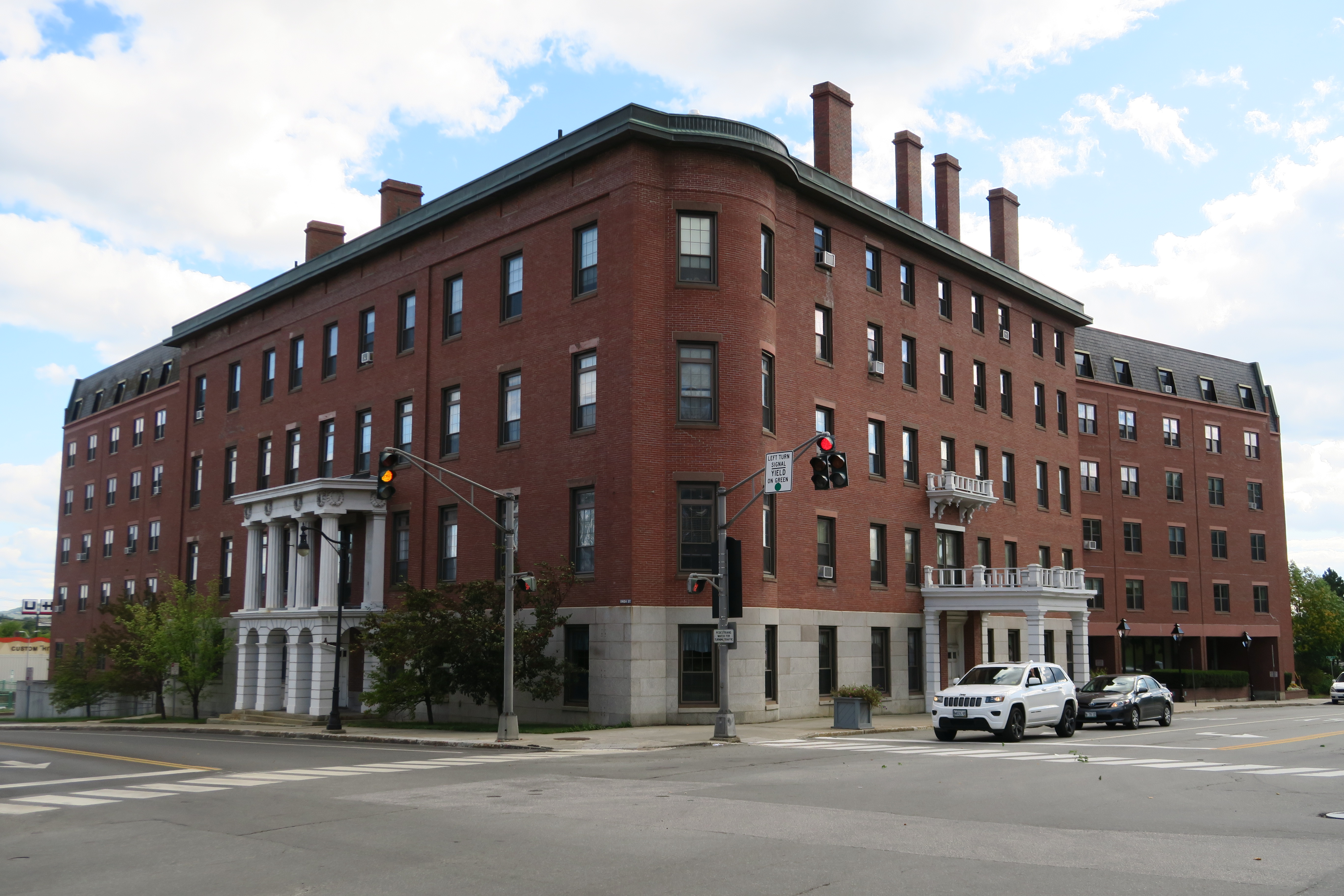
Bangor House in 2016

The aircraft stopped at the Bangor International Airport to refuel and allow passengers to clear American customs and immigration before re-boarding. While he was half asleep, a flight attendant stopped by his seat and wished him a pleasant visit to San Francisco; she had finished her shift and was leaving the plane. This led Kreuz to believe mistakenly that he had arrived in California, and he disembarked and took a taxi into the city, asking the driver for "sleep". The taxi drive took him to the Bangor House hotel, where he rented a room.

For four days, Kreuz vainly searched for the Golden Gate Bridge and other San Francisco landmarks. The only sight which resonated with his prior image of the California city were the two local Chinese restaurants; he dined at one, knowing the fame of San Francisco's Chinatown. He concluded he was in a suburb of the metropolis, and began to realize his mistake after he was forced to leave his room after the hotel was completely booked for parents' weekend at the University of Maine. A taxi driver later responded to his request to be taken to San Francisco, informing him that it was 6,000 kilometres (3,700 mi) away.

A friend of Gertrude and Kenneth Romine overheard Kreuz asking for directions to San Francisco in a Bangor pub; knowing the Romines spoke German, the friend contacted the couple on Friday, October 14. The Romines took Kreuz to the Black Rose German-American restaurant in nearby Old Town, Maine, which they owned and was managed by their son Ralph Coffman. Gertrude was the first to hear his story and give him a complete picture of where he was. The Romines and Coffman subsequently found him a hotel room in the nearby town of Milford while acting as his hosts and trying to figure out what to do. His story was picked up by the local press on October 20, and soon went national.

==== Bangor's response and local celebrity ====
"As a governor who sometimes wonders where he's at, I understand what happened to you. But I also want you to know that you are in Augusta today."

— Gov. James B. Longley, October 26, 1977 news articles

The people of Bangor were so touched and amused to be mistaken for San Francisco that over the next 10 days Kreuz was transformed into a local celebrity. He was the guest of honor at an Oktoberfest event sponsored by the Chamber of Commerce, was made an honorary member of the Penobscot tribe and Old Town Rotary Club, received the keys to the city, met fellow local celebrity Andre the Seal, and flew to the state capital in Augusta on October 25 to meet Governor James B. Longley and Secretary of State Markham Gartley. At his own request, he visited a McDonald's and was allowed to flip the hamburgers. Kreuz's 50th birthday was celebrated by gala parties held in the McDonald's and Black Rose restaurants.

A growing circle of local 'friends' organized sight-seeing trips for him around the region, accompanied everywhere by local press. Kreuz was by all reports impressed, grateful, and charming. He also received three marriage invitations, and a couple in the northern Maine town of St. Francis gave him an acre of land.

Kreuz's vacation leave was scheduled to end on October 31. Originally, Kreuz was to return to Germany on Sunday, October 23, when the charter flight would stop at Bangor for fuel; however, he first declared his plans to return to Bangor in 1978. Coffman struggled with arranging a flight through World Airways for nearly a week, and called Senator William D. Hathaway for assistance. World Airways offered Kreuz seats on flights from Bangor to catch up with his original scheduled charter on Friday (October 21) or late Monday (October 24). The return flight was scheduled to depart Oakland, California, at 11 am on Tuesday, October 25 and was scheduled originally to stop in Bangor for fuel, but World Airways eliminated the stopover in Bangor, and needed to get Kreuz on board when the flight departed Oakland or stopped in Chicago instead. Kreuz could not be found in time for the Friday flight and refused the Monday flight as he had been given only a few hours' notice to board. Instead, Kreuz and his hosts said he would board a return flight on October 31, although World Airways did not have a flight scheduled to Germany for that day.

==== Kreuz as bi-national news-maker and San Francisco celebrity ====
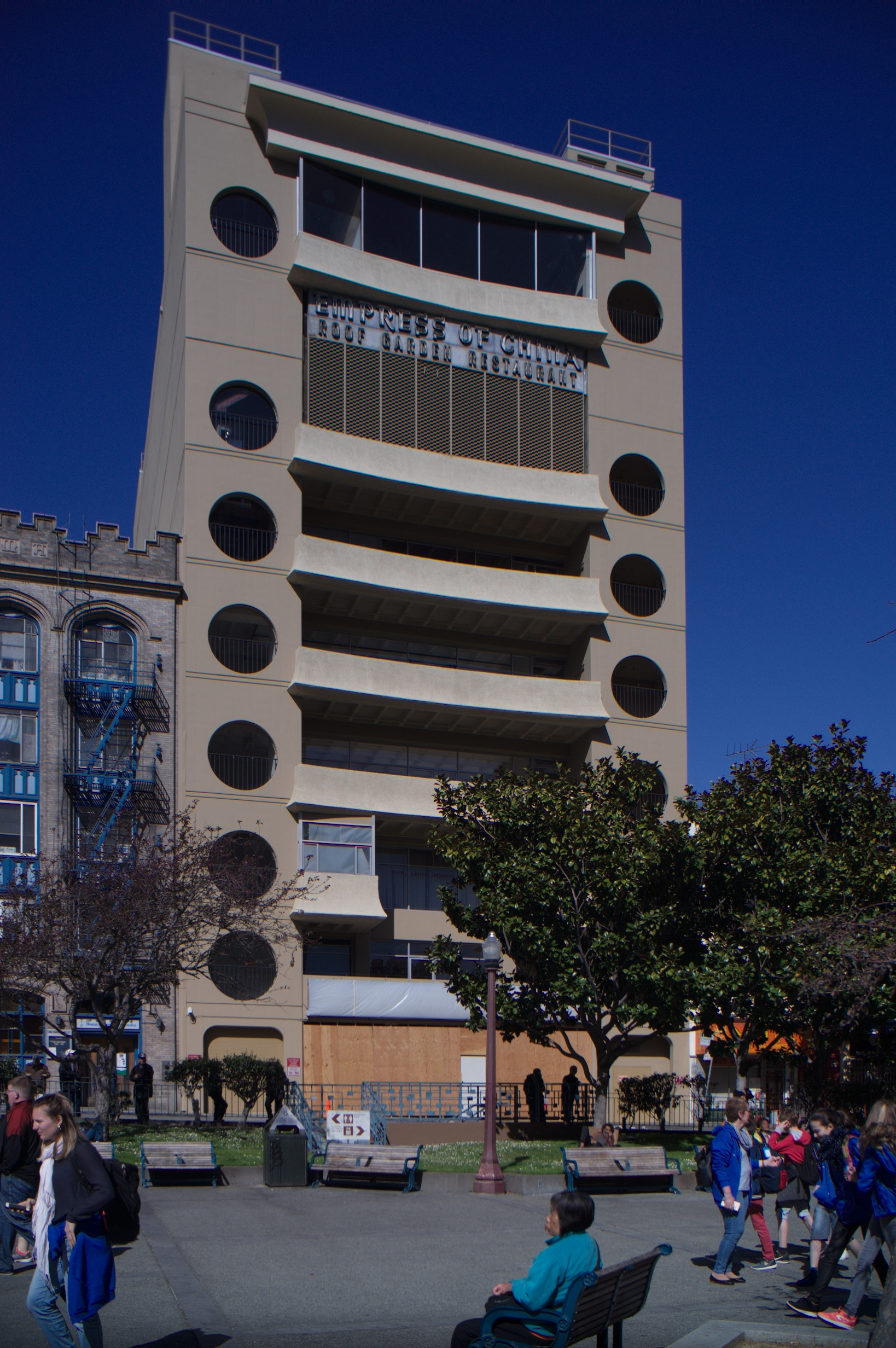
The Empress of China restaurant in San Francisco's Chinatown in 2018

Kreuz's story was reported in Time magazine, by the Associated Press, and on NBC's Today Show, where host Tom Brokaw lauded the people of Bangor, Maine, for being such good hosts. CBS Evening News aired segments on Kreuz two nights in a row. Stern and Der Spiegel reported his story in West Germany.

The citizens of San Francisco were equally amused, and the San Francisco Examiner announced on October 26 they would fly Kreuz and Coffman to their city on October 28, where he was given an even stronger dose of celebrity treatment. Kreuz was not impressed by San Francisco upon his arrival, noting the lack of trees on the trip from the airport. Mayor George Moscone gave him the key to the city. Kreuz also was feted in Chinatown, where he was inducted into the Wong Family Association during a banquet held at the Empress of China restaurant, and received a standing ovation when he was invited to enter the ring at the Grand National Rodeo and Horse Show in the Cow Palace, where he was presented with a white cowboy hat, having received a Native American head-dress in Maine. Frederic Wessinger, the president of Blitz-Weinhard Brewing Company, presented Kreuz with a case of beer; Wessinger's great-grandfather, founder of the brewery, also had intended to travel from Germany to San Francisco in the 1850s, but ended up in Oregon instead.

Kreuz luckily had a sense of humor. He told Moscone he drank 17 beers a day, and when he finally boarded a flight back to West Germany on October 31 at Oakland International Airport, he posed with an oversized luggage tag provided by World Airways that read, in English and German, "Please, let me off in Frankfurt / Bitte, in Frankfurt aussteigen lassen". Upon his return to Frankfurt, Kreuz declared his preference for Maine over San Francisco and added "If Kennedy can say 'I am a Berliner,' then I am a Bangor". Kreuz was greeted in Frankfurt by the press, his employer, Georg Schaller, and friends, accompanied by a 50 litres (13 US gal) keg of beer from Schaller's brewery.

=== Second trip to Bangor (1978): The price of celebrity ===
Kreuz returned to Bangor approximately a year later for a month-long visit, courtesy of the Equitable Life Assurance company, to officiate at the ribbon-cutting ceremony on October 5, 1978, at the new Bangor Mall. It was the first shopping mall he had seen. His flight arrived in Logan International Airport on September 25, where he was met by the Romines and took a tour of Boston, and he was scheduled to depart on October 20 after driving west to the Grand Canyon with them. The journey cemented (and capitalized upon) Kreuz's celebrity/newsmaker status, drawing thousands and garnering nearly as much publicity for Kreuz and the mall as the incident the previous year.

Kreuz's lingering celebrity cost him his job, however. The West German brewery that employed him attempted to use his news-worthiness for its own purposes, but bristled when Kreuz asked for compensation beyond his laborer's salary. In an interview with the West German press, he made the spontaneous but naive admission that he drank a competitor's brand of beer, due to regional distribution arrangements. His month-long absence to promote an American shopping mall (and during the Oktoberfest season) was likely the final straw, as he was fired from his job of 9 1/2 years in November 1978, shortly after he returned.

=== Third trip to Bangor (1979): The limits of celebrity ===
Kreuz returned to Bangor a third and final time from February 24 to March 17, 1979, now at his own expense and accompanied by little fanfare. Hoping to trade on his celebrity to find a job and emigrate, he was disappointed when his only forthcoming offer was a minimum wage janitorial position at the Bangor Mall. Before flying back to West Germany and an uncertain future, he gave an exit interview to the Bangor Daily News in which he said he was not bitter and was 'grateful' for the one job offer and the kindness of strangers, but that this third trip to Bangor had been a mistake.

He never returned to the U.S. but as of 1984, was still faithfully paying the annual property tax on his small plot of land in northern Maine.

=== Last days ===
Sebastian Dalkowski, a freelance German journalist, investigated the fate of Erwin Kreuz for the Austrian history podcast "Geschichten aus der Geschichte". After returning from America, Erwin Kreuz continued to live his bachelor life in Adelsried and never married. During his last days, he stayed at a nursing home in Peiting, Bavaria. His nurse mentioned that he regularly viewed a photo album from his time in Bangor, which kept him awake and joyful despite his dementia, which resulted from his excessive alcohol consumption. He died in 2010 at the age of 83.

== Kreuz as travel folklore ==
Kreuz's story continued to be told and re-told into the 21st century as not only Maine folklore, but the folklore of modern air travel. The Kreuz story has been related in Bill Harris' Landscapes of America, vol.2 (1987) and An American Moment (1990), and it helped Gail Fine illustrate a problem in philosophy in her 1999 Oxford University Press book Plato Two: Ethics, Politics, Religion, and the Soul. Barbara Sjoholm (writing as Barbara Wilson) made it the basis for the short story "Looking for the Golden Gate", published in her collections Thin Ice (1981) and Miss Venezuela (1988).

The Washington Post revived the Kreuz incident when Yusuf Islam, formerly known as Cat Stevens, was diverted to Bangor, Maine, following the September 11 attacks, and Kreuz's story was published in Frommer's Maine Coast Guide as late as 2009. Former New York Times reporter Blake Fleetwood recalled the Kreuz incident in a Huffington Post essay of 2007, in which he revealed that mistakes like Kreuz's were more common than most realize.

Kreuz is the subject of a ballad recorded by Maine folksinger Wendell Austin.
