= January 23–27, 2026 North American winter storm =

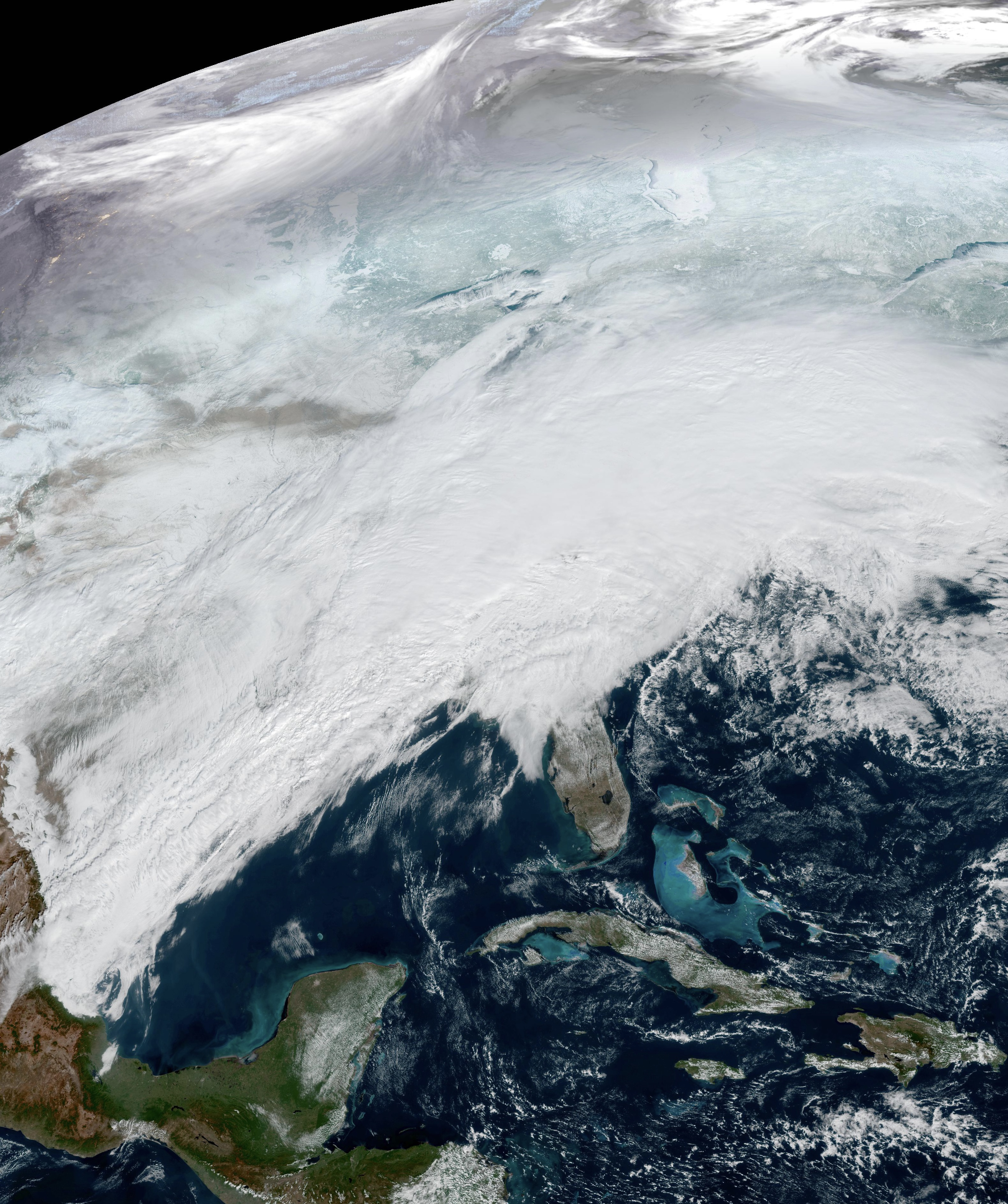
- GOES-19 satellite imagery of the extratropical cyclone responsible for the winter storm over the Eastern United States on January 25

Meteorological history
- Formed: January 22, 2026
- Exited land: January 27, 2026
- Dissipated: January 30, 2026

Category 3 "Major" winter storm
- Regional snowfall index: 6.74 (NOAA)
- Highest winds: 80 mph (130 km/h) (1-minute sustained winds)
- Highest gusts: 93 mph (150 km/h) in Cove Mountain, Tennessee
- Lowest pressure: 958 mbar (hPa); 28.29 inHg
- Lowest temp: −43 °F (−42 °C) in Seagull, Minnesota
- Max. snowfall: Snow – 31.0 in (79 cm) near Bonito Lake, New Mexico; Ice – 1 in (25 mm) in multiple states Sleet – 6.7 inches (17 cm) in Adams Field, Little Rock, Arkansas

Tornado outbreak
- Tornadoes: 5
- Max. rating: EF2 tornado
- Duration: 2 hours, 47 minutes on January 25
- Highest winds: Tornadic – 115 mph (185 km/h) (Geneva, Alabama EF2 tornado)
- Highest gusts: Non-tornadic – 71 mph (114 km/h) near Montgomery, Alabama

Overall effects
- Fatalities: 181
- Injuries: 100+
- Damage: >$4 billion (2026 USD)
- Areas affected: Four Corners, Ohio Valley, Southern, North Texas, Midwestern, Great Lakes and Eastern United States (Mid-Atlantic states), New England, Central and Atlantic Canada, Northern Mexico
- Power outages: > 1,000,000
- Part of the 2025–26 North American winter

From January 23 to January 27, 2026, a very large and expansive winter storm caused deadly and catastrophic ice and snow impacts across Northern Mexico, the Southern and Northeastern United States, and Canada. It was unofficially referred to as Winter Storm Fern by The Weather Channel and various news outlets, or Snowmageddon in some areas. The storm brought over two feet of snow to some locations in New Mexico and New England and up to an inch of ice in the Southern United States. The ice storm impacts led to widespread power outages lasting for up to a week in some locations.

Developing in part from an upper-level low on January 22, the winter storm steadily moved eastwards across the Central United States, dropping a very large swath of wintry precipitation. By January 25, the system had moved into the Northeast, where it began to transition into a nor'easter. Gusty winds and heavy snow continued to occur in New England, even as it pulled away from the coastline the following day, leaving many parts of North America with a mix of rain, sleet, freezing rain, and snow. Meteorologists described the storm as "potentially historic" in its impact, with the storm at one point encompassing nearly 2,000 miles (3,200 km) of length stretching from the Mexico–United States border far into eastern regions of Canada. Twenty-four U.S. state governors issued emergency declarations in response to the storm. Winter weather alerts were also issued across a similar length of terrain, affecting up to 230 million people. The storm resulted in over 10,000 flights nationwide in the United States being cancelled or postponed. Travel bans were also enacted in numerous states.

As of February 23, 181 deaths had been confirmed due to the storm, becoming the deadliest winter storm in North America since Winter Storm Uri, which caused the 2021 Texas power crisis and killed at least 290 people. Over a million customers lost power, mostly concentrated within the South where a damaging and crippling ice storm occurred, causing power lines and trees to snap and break under the immense weight. Icy conditions also led to hazardous travel afterwards. Damages are estimated to be in excess of US$4 billion. Overall, a large swath of snowfall ranging from 1–2 feet (12–24 in; 30–61 cm) occurred from Texas to Maine, and in some cases (particularly in the South) broke daily snowfall records. In the Mid-Atlantic states and Northeast, where the storm became a nor'easter, several locations along the I-95 corridor—specifically Philadelphia, Pennsylvania, and New York City—saw their heaviest snowfall accumulation since a nor'easter in February 2021. Several days after the storm, the Carolinas were affected by yet another powerful winter storm, compounding recovery costs there.

== Meteorological history ==
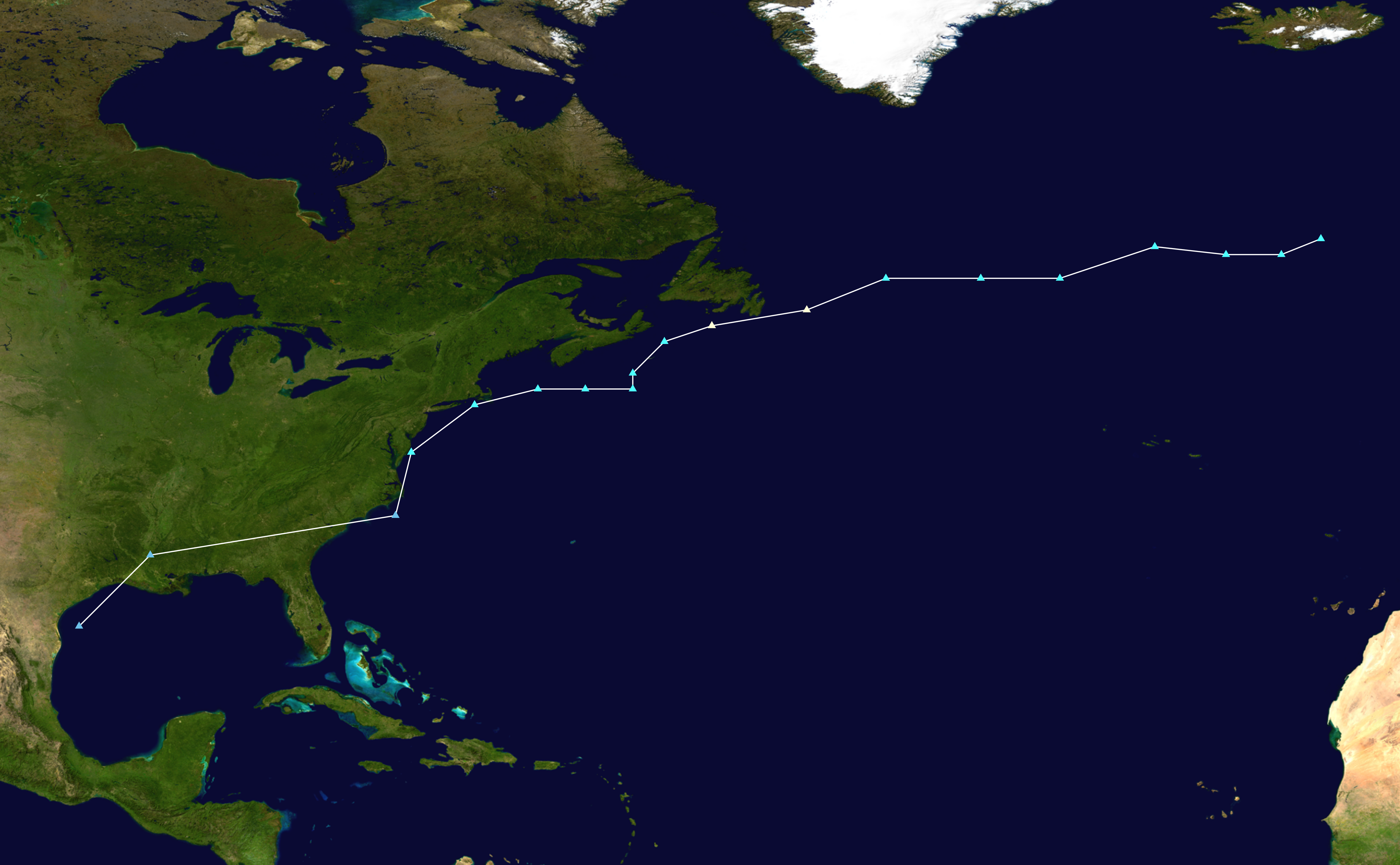
Map plotting the storm's track and intensity, according to the Saffir–Simpson scale Map key Saffir–Simpson scale Tropical depression (≤38 mph, ≤62 km/h) Tropical storm (39–73 mph, 63–118 km/h) Category 1 (74–95 mph, 119–153 km/h) Category 2 (96–110 mph, 154–177 km/h) Category 3 (111–129 mph, 178–208 km/h) Category 4 (130–156 mph, 209–251 km/h) Category 5 (≥157 mph, ≥252 km/h) Unknown Storm type Tropical cyclone Subtropical cyclone Extratropical cyclone, remnant low, tropical disturbance, or monsoon depression

On January 21, 2026, news media and meteorological outlets began publicly forecasting that a large-scale winter storm would impact a significant portion of the continental United States and potentially regions of Canada. The storm originated from the effect of a wave in the upper atmosphere stretching the polar vortex, which normally sits over northern Canada and Alaska, southwards. The cold air from this effect had been forecast to interact with moisture off the coast of California and the Gulf of Mexico to create the expected ice and snow that would impact large portions of North America, especially the United States. The storm first developed on January 22 over the Pacific Ocean as a cold-core low moving southeastwards towards the Baja California peninsula. Due to the immense size and expected impact of the winter storm, a NOAA Gulfstream IV-SP flew into the system to collect data in order to improve forecasting accuracy. The system developed over the Great Plains midday January 23, as a broad trough coalesced over the Plains and Rockies. Wintry precipitation associated with the developing system began to progress to the east (primarily producing sleet and freezing rain), spreading into northern Texas, southern regions of Oklahoma, and southern Arkansas.

History of the winter storm seen through GOES-19

Later that night, a shift in precipitation to snow began over central and eastern Oklahoma and far-western Arkansas, with an increase in moisture expected to lead to snowfall rates of up to 1 inch (2.5 cm) per hour. Snow started to fall in central Arkansas in the early hours of January 24. By 15:00 UTC on January 24, the Weather Prediction Center (WPC) began issuing storm summary bulletins on the system, as a low pressure wave had settled along a cold front near the Gulf Coast, met by a barometric ridge over the Plains. Several tornado warnings and watches were issued in Alabama, Georgia, and Florida, with gusts of 71 mph (114 km/h) reported in Montgomery, Alabama. The system later underwent Miller B type cyclogenesis as a new area of low pressure developed off the coast of the Southeast on January 25, strengthening as it moved northwards near New England offshore south of Cape Cod early the following day. As the system pulled away from the coastline and snow began to taper off, the WPC issued its last storm summary bulletin at 21:00 UTC on January 26.

The system brought snowfall to Maritime Canada beginning late on January 25. The storm continued along the coast of Atlantic Canada through January 27. The snowfall largely ended across the Maritimes by the morning of January 27, though Cape Breton continued to see snowfall close to noon. The system passed just south of the Avalon Peninsula late that day. Heavy snow and strong winds occurred in Newfoundland.

== Preparations ==
=== United States ===
All warnings and advisories issued in the contiguous United States due to the storm
Winter Storm Warning
Ice Storm Warning
Winter Weather Advisory

More than 20 state governors issued emergency declarations in anticipation of the storm. A large swath of winter weather alerts were issued by the NWS, including winter storm warnings and ice storm warnings stretching from the Four Corners region to as far northeast as Maine, encompassing a near 2,000-mile (3,200 km) stretch of contiguous alerts comprising a population of more than 230 million people.

From January 23 to January 25, the number of counties under a winter storm warning at the same time was the highest recorded. National Guardsmen from 12 states were activated in advance of the storm.

Over 560 flights in the United States were cancelled by 4:40 p.m. EST on January 23, almost 4,000 on January 24, and over 9,000 on January 25. Several sporting events were also postponed, such as the Arkansas Women's Basketball home game against Texas. Other events, like the game between the Predators and Utah Mammoth's in Nashville, were rescheduled to begin earlier.

At Camp Minden, Louisiana, 250,000 meals, 400,000 liters of water, and 30 generators were pre-positioned, according to a memo from the Federal Emergency Management Agency issued on January 23. There were also shuttle drivers stationed in Pennsylvania, Texas, Louisiana, and Georgia to transport materials quickly. Additionally, 28 urban search and rescue teams were on standby.

==== Southwest ====
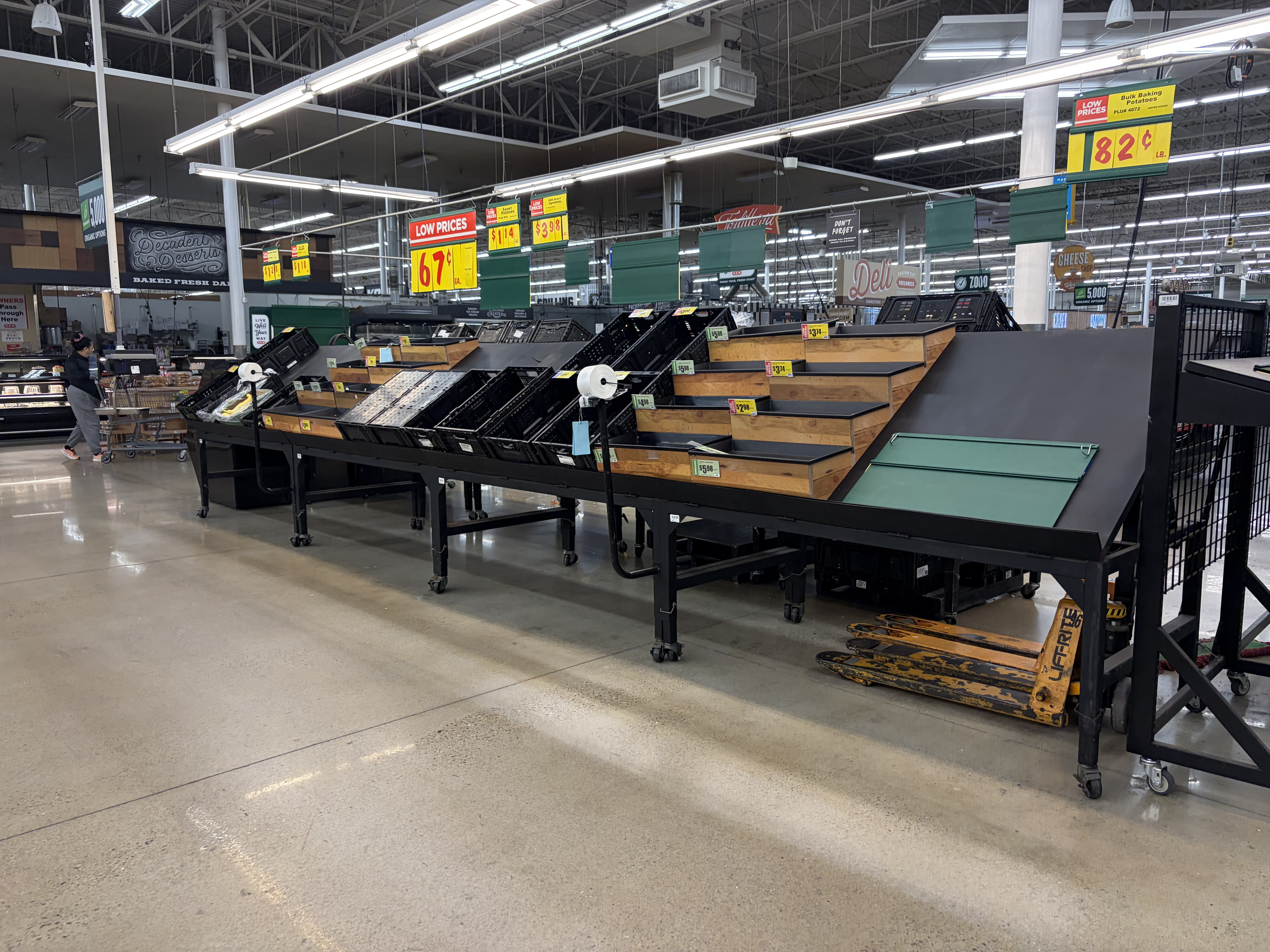
Empty shelves at a grocery store in Corpus Christi, Texas, in advance of the storm

A state of emergency was declared by New Mexico Governor Michelle Lujan Grisham. The emergency declaration allocated $200,000 to support communities in New Mexico.

Texas Governor Greg Abbott declared a state of emergency on January 21, mobilizing the state's Division of Emergency Management (TDEM) to activate response resources. The Texas Rangers cancelled a Fan Fest event that was set to take place on January 24. DoorDash activated their Severe Weather Protocol and temporarily suspended its operations in Northwest Texas, including the cities of Amarillo and Lubbock, from January 23 at 7:00 p.m. CST to January 24 at 12:00 p.m. CST due to the hazardous road conditions.

==== South ====
Governor Kay Ivey declared a state of emergency for 19 counties in northern Alabama, mainly for the likelihood of significant ice storm damage.

On January 22, Arkansas Governor Sarah Huckabee Sanders declared a state of emergency, and the Arkansas Division of Emergency Management was authorized $250,000 from the Disaster Response and Recovery Fund of Arkansas.

Georgia Governor Brian Kemp also declared a state of emergency and mobilized 500 National Guardsmen.

Louisiana Governor Jeff Landry declared a state of emergency on January 18 and the Governor's Office of Homeland Security and Emergency Preparedness activated its Crisis Actions Team. Residents were noted to have bought firewood in order to stay warm during the storm and its aftermath. The Louisiana Department of Transportation (LDOTD) said that crews were stocked on deicing solutions and that they would have crews pre-treating roads beginning in shifts on January 23. Entergy stated that they would monitor the power situation and respond "as soon as it is safe to do so".

A state of emergency was declared by Mississippi Governor Tate Reeves beginning on January 23.

North Carolina Governor Josh Stein declared a state of emergency on January 21.

==== Mid-Atlantic ====
A state of preparedness was issued by Governor Patrick Morrisey for West Virginia on January 21. A state of emergency was issued by Virginia Governor Abigail Spanberger on January 22. Maryland Governor Wes Moore declared a state of preparedness. The University of Maryland allowed for move-ins for the second semester as early as January 23 and waived early arrival fees for that day due to the inclement weather.

A state of emergency was declared for New York by Governor Kathy Hochul on January 23. Early voting for special elections in New York City were cancelled for January 25. LaGuardia Airport closed at 1 p.m. on January 25 during the storm while NJ Transit and NYC Ferry also suspended service. All state parks in New Jersey were closed on January 24 at 5:00 p.m. SEPTA also began suspending service on January 25 at 2:00 p.m.

States of emergencies were also declared by Maryland Governor Wes Moore, New Jersey Governor Mikie Sherrill, Pennsylvania Governor Josh Shapiro, Delaware Governor Matt Meyer, West Virginia Governor Patrick Morrisey, and Washington, D.C. mayor Muriel Bowser.

==== Midwest ====
Indiana Governor Mike Braun declared a state of emergency and a statewide disaster declaration on January 24. The declaration came after heavy snow accumulation, with some reports indicating 1–4 inches (2.5–10.2 cm) of snowfall accumulation on the evening of January 24. The declaration was also issued in anticipation of forecasts released earlier on January 24 projecting 12–18 inches (30–46 cm) of snowfall accumulation in the state from January 24 to January 25, primarily in the southern portions of the state.

In Iowa, cold temperatures required schools to be cancelled on January 23 and delayed on January 26.

Missouri Governor Mike Kehoe issued a state of emergency and activated the state's National Guard as well as its Emergency Operations Center. Kansas Governor Laura Kelly declared a state of disaster emergency on the morning of January 23.

==== Ohio Valley ====
Tennessee Governor Bill Lee declared a state of emergency for the entirety of Tennessee on January 22. A Memphis Grizzlies game against the Denver Nuggets was postponed. The Ohio Department of Transportation mobilized 1,500 snowplows. Kentucky Governor Andy Beshear declared a state of emergency on January 23. Judge-Executive Tim Hutchins declared a state of emergency for Nelson County, Kentucky. Ohio Governor Mike DeWine declared a state of emergency on January 24 and suspended normal state purchasing requirements to procure necessary resources. Across Ohio and parts of Northern Kentucky, numerous snow emergencies were issued.

==== New England ====
Connecticut Governor Ned Lamont declared a state of emergency on the night of January 24 and scheduled it to take effect on January 25 at noon. Concurrent with the emergency declaration was a statewide travel ban for all semi trucks, RVs, tankers, and vehicles towing trailers. The truck ban was lifted on January 26 at 6:30 a.m. EST. Tweed New Haven Airport was shut down in result of the storm.

Boston Mayor Michelle Wu declared a snow emergency on January 24. Boston Public Schools suspended classes for January 26.

=== Canada ===
Across southern Ontario, yellow snowfall warnings were issued from Windsor to Ottawa by Environment and Climate Change Canada (ECCC). In the Greater Toronto Area, an orange-level winter storm warning was issued by ECCC on January 24 in anticipation of 20–40 centimetres (7.9–15.7 in) of snowfall accumulation in the area. Toronto's 311 line was reinforced with additional staff. Five warming centers and two surge spaces were set to remain open in the city. Drop-in programs also had extended hours. In Vaughan, the city announced it had over 230 pieces of winter maintenance equipment ready. In Brampton, Mayor Patrick Brown stated the city had prepared over 360 snow removal vehicles.

Across southern Quebec, 10–20 cm (3.9–7.9 in) of snow was forecasted, with snowfall rates of up to 1–2 cm (0.39–0.79 in) and gusts of up to 40 km/h (25 mph). A yellow snowfall warning was issued by the ECCC for portions of southern Quebec and the Montreal area. In the Quebec City Area, a special weather statement was in effect for 10 cm (3.9 in) of snow. The Quebec Ministry of Transport and Sustainable Mobility stated it would utilize abrasives rather than road salt due to the extreme cold.

In the Maritimes, Environment and Climate Change Canada issued yellow winter storm warnings for southern Nova Scotia while yellow snowfall warnings were issued for the rest of Nova Scotia and for the southern half of New Brunswick on January 25. A special weather statement was also put in effect for Prince Edward Island.

A yellow winter storm warning was issued by Environment and Climate Change Canada for eastern and southern Newfoundland on January 26.

=== Mexico ===
The National Meteorological Service issued a winter weather alert for Northern Mexico on January 23. Classes were suspended in Tamaulipas due to low temperatures.

== Impact ==
Casualties by state/province
State/province	Deaths	Ref.
Mississippi	30	
Tennessee	29	
Kentucky	22	
New York	15	
Indiana	13	
Texas	13	
Louisiana	9	
Pennsylvania	8	
Maine	7	
Virginia	7	
South Carolina	6	
Illinois	3	
Arkansas	2	
Massachusetts	2	
Ohio	2	
Quebec	2	
Missouri	2	
Iowa	2	
North Carolina	1	
Maryland	1	
Michigan	1	
Kansas	1	
New Jersey	1	
Oklahoma	1	
Ontario	1	
Total	181	

=== United States ===
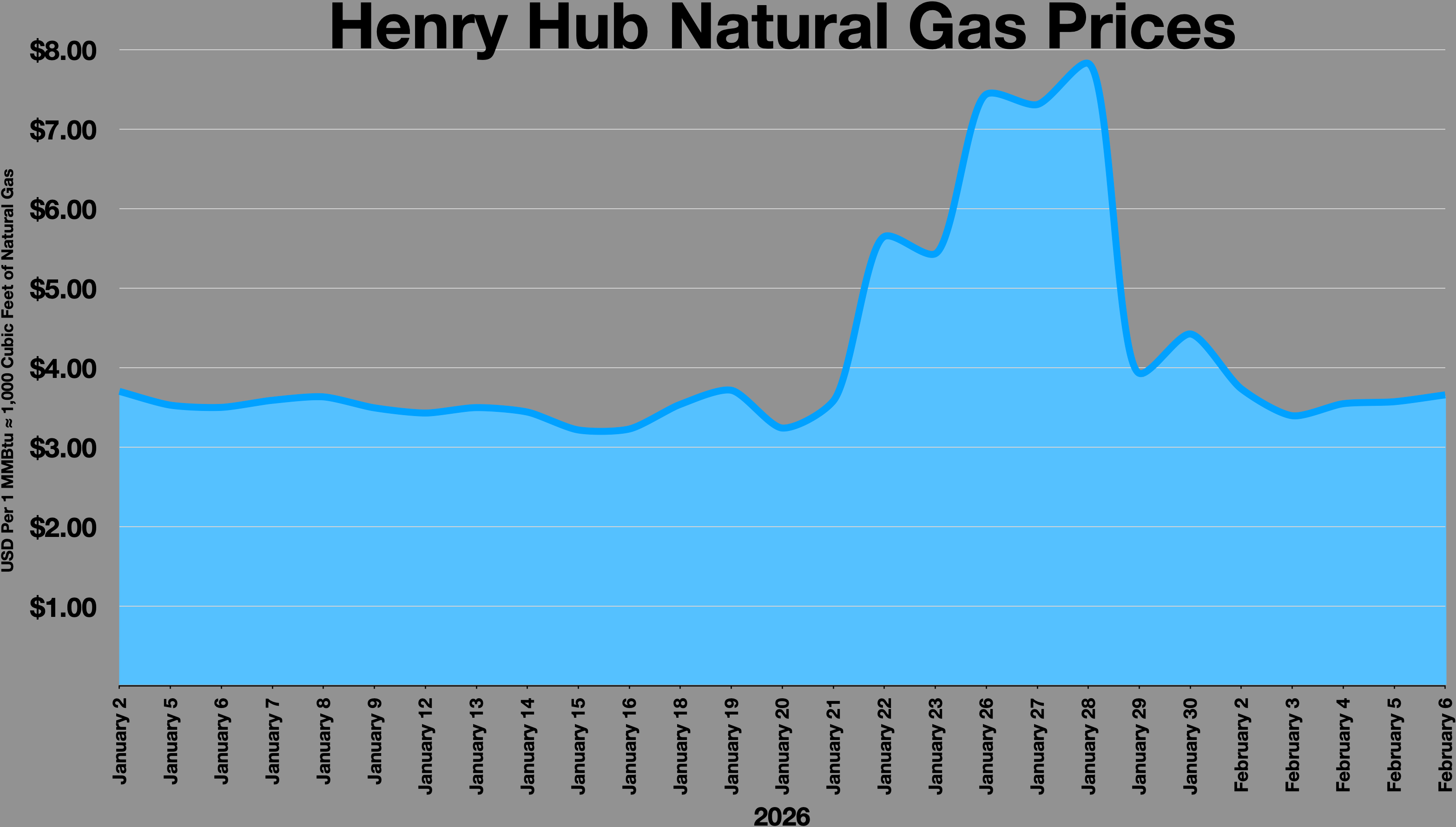
Henry Hub natural gas prices during the storm

By the afternoon of January 24, over 135,000 power outages were reported. Almost 700,000 were without power by the morning of January 25. By mid-day, that number was over 1 million, primarily in Texas, Louisiana, the Mississippi Delta, and the southern Ohio River basin. That number still rested around 700,000 by mid-day on January 26. Meteorologists from the National Weather Service estimated that there were around 300 million people under winter precipitation and/or cold warnings or advisories. By mid-morning of January 26, over half of the contiguous United States was covered by snow.

More than 10,000 flights were cancelled by midday on January 25, one of the most weather-related flight cancellations in one day in US history. With over 11,000 by end of day, it became the worst day for cancellations since March 30, 2020, at the height of the COVID-19 pandemic. A total of over 20,000 flights had been cancelled from January 23–26. Dozens of Amtrak trains were also cancelled, with some routes being impacted up to a week after the storm had passed.

==== Southwest ====
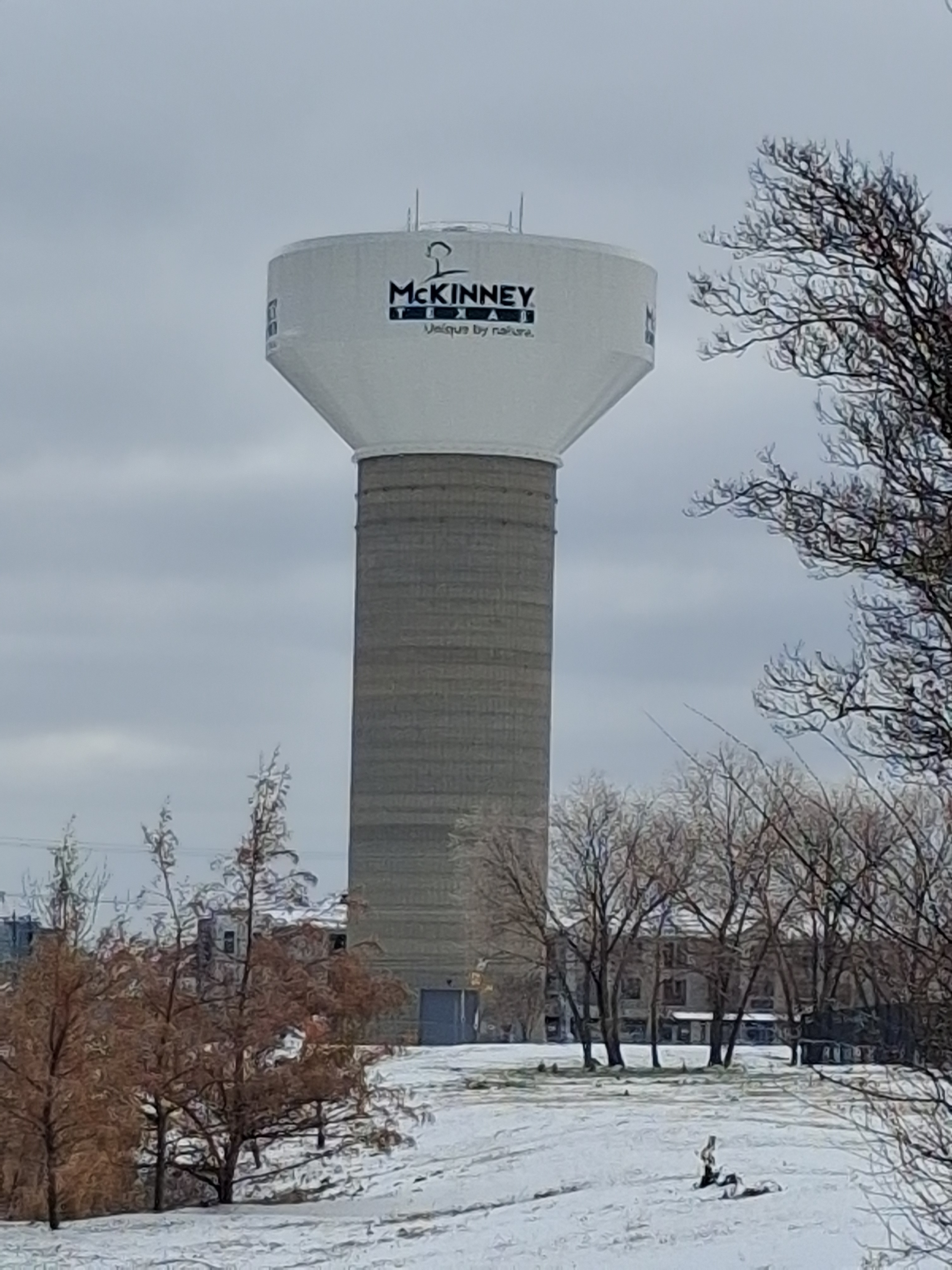
Water Tower in McKinney, Texas

Bonito Lake, New Mexico, recorded 31 in (79 cm) of snow. The snow in New Mexico led to 32 crashes, of which seven involved injuries.

Many roadways in Texas were closed due to icy conditions. Two 18-wheelers became stuck on a ramp on I-40, requiring them to be towed. Icy roads in Houston led to a few roads closing. A 56-year-old man was killed in a multi-vehicle crash in Kimble County. One person died in Austin after being exposed to the cold. Two 16-year-old girls in Frisco were killed after striking a tree while riding a sled pulled by a car. Three young boys were killed after falling through ice on a pond near Bonham. Two cold-related deaths occurred in Fort Worth. A Ponder ISD high school senior student died in a sledding accident. Three were found dead during the cold snap in Houston.

On January 25, the Dallas Fort Worth International Airport set a daily snowfall record with 0.9 in (2.3 cm) of snow recorded. The snowfall at the airport caused the Dallas Mavericks to get stuck on the tarmac, forcing them to postpone their game against the Milwaukee Bucks.

ERCOT had forecasted an electricity load of 85 GW and a high power price, but the load only peaked at 75.6 GW and at usual power price.

Many schools in Central Texas re-opened on January 28; many re-opened in North Texas on January 29.

Oklahoma City recorded 4.4 in (11 cm) of snow on January 24, which broke the previous daily snowfall record set in 1948. A woman was killed in a sledding accident in Oklahoma City on January 25.

==== South ====
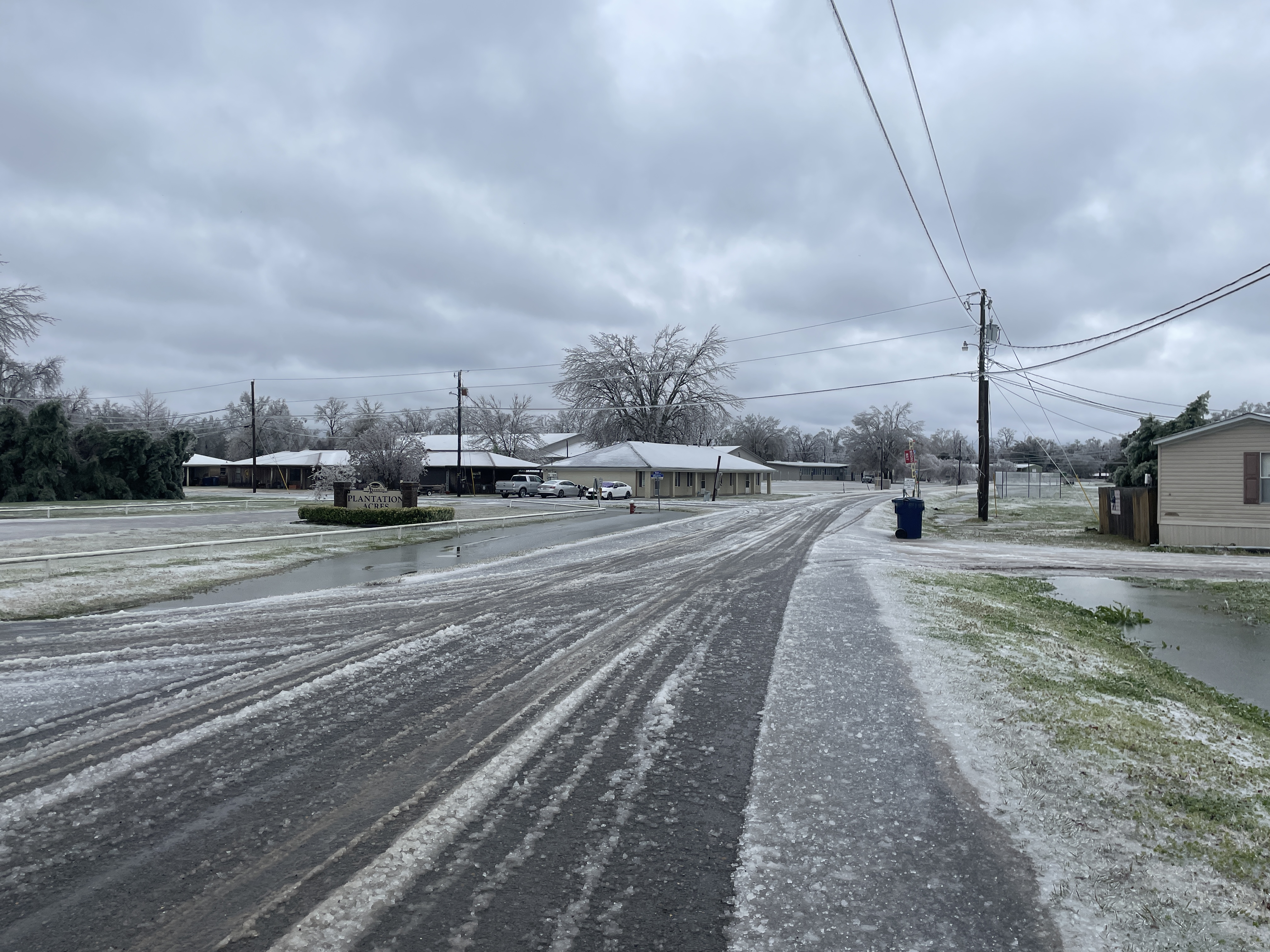
Ice buildup on the roads in Madison Parish, Louisiana

Little Rock, Arkansas, received 6 in (15 cm) of snow and broke a daily snowfall record set in 1899. In Saline County, a 17-year-old boy was killed after striking a tree while riding a sled pulled by an ATV. An 11-year-old was killed in an ATV accident in Saline County, as well. Four injuries occurred in Saline County, three in Columbia County, and one in Cleburne County. Near Hope, a man was killed in an accident involving an ATV.

Over 1,000 flights were cancelled at Hartsfield–Jackson Atlanta International Airport in Atlanta, Georgia for January 25. Significant ice accumulations were reported throughout the state, with a peak of 0.60 in (15 mm) of ice in Toccoa.

There were a total of nine fatalities in Louisiana, five of which were caused by hypothermia. Two deaths occurred in Caddo Parish, with an additional two fatalities in DeSoto Parish, one due to carbon monoxide poisoning and another due to an oxygen concentrator failure from the regional power outage. The vast majority of school districts, universities, and municipal governments in Louisiana were closed due to the storm, with many institutions in north Louisiana remaining closed through January 30. The lowest temperature of the storm in Louisiana was in Shreveport, where it reached 17 °F (−8 °C). Alexandria had the highest wind gust of the state at 27 miles per hour (43 km/h). Governor Jeff Landry toured north Louisiana by helicopter on January 27 to assess the damage. Phillip May, CEO of Entergy, told the over 51,000 customers in Louisiana without power since Saturday, January 24 that full power restoration would not be until at least January 31. On January 31, Entergy announced full power restoration would not be until February 5 after high winds caused further repair delays. I-20 suffered multi-day backups lasting into the end of the week.

The Mississippi Emergency Management Agency confirmed 30 deaths in Mississippi. Among them were a 66-year-old in Jackson and a 73-year-old in Iuka, the latter of whom died when a tree fell on his mobile home. A fatality occurred in DeSoto County. Panola County was one of the hardest hit counties with six deaths. Two others were injured in the state. Almost 300,000 customers lost power in Mississippi alone due to the ice storm. The University of Mississippi in Oxford was set remain closed through at least February 8.

Over 600 traffic accidents were reported in North Carolina during the storm, with portions of I-26 and I-85 closing. In Buncombe County, a 31-year-old man died from hypothermia-related causes, while two people died in South Carolina, in Greenwood and Laurens counties, respectively, from the extreme cold.

The city of Nashville, Tennessee, set a new precipitation record on January 24, with 1.92 in (49 mm) of precipitation. Some of that was freezing rain, leading to the worst ice storm since 1994 for the region. Additionally, Nashville Electric Service recorded the highest number of outages at one time in its history, peaking at 230,000. The state as a whole still recorded more than 250,000 outages by January 26, the highest number of any state by that time. A total of 29 fatalities was confirmed by the Tennessee Department of Health. A driver died in a single-vehicle crash in Dyersburg. A Brownsville man suffered a heart attack while shoveling snow. Two other individuals died amid the storm, one an 11-year-old in Crockett County, the other in Obion County. There were a total of two fatalities in Obion County. Six fatalities occurred in Shelby County. Davidson and Knox counties both had three fatalities. Fayette, Hardin, Hawkins, Henderson, and Hickman counties had two fatalities each. Cheatham, Hancock, and Johnson had one fatality each. 18 others were injured in more than 160 additional weather-related crashes across Tennessee. As many as 300,000 people were estimated to have lost power as a result of damaging ice accumulation. Numerous other accidents were reported; officials stated that residents should stay off the roads unless absolutely necessary.

The storm affected 14 radio stations across the country, most in the South, particularly in Georgia and Mississippi, though specific affected stations were not noted. The Federal Communications Commission activated the Disaster Information Reporting System (DIRS), with the FCC encouraging radio stations to report their status online through the system. The FCC also reported one TV station was affected. The FCC granted special temporary authority for Citizens Band users, relaxing rules for those frequencies.

===== Severe weather =====
EFU	EF0	EF1	EF2	EF3	EF4	EF5
0	1	3	1	0	0	0

A line of severe storms produced widespread wind damage along with several suspected tornadoes in southern Alabama, southwestern Georgia, and the Florida Panhandle on January 25 with 5 simultaneous tornado warnings at its peak. Five tornadoes touched down in Alabama and Florida, one of which was rated EF2.

==== Midwest ====
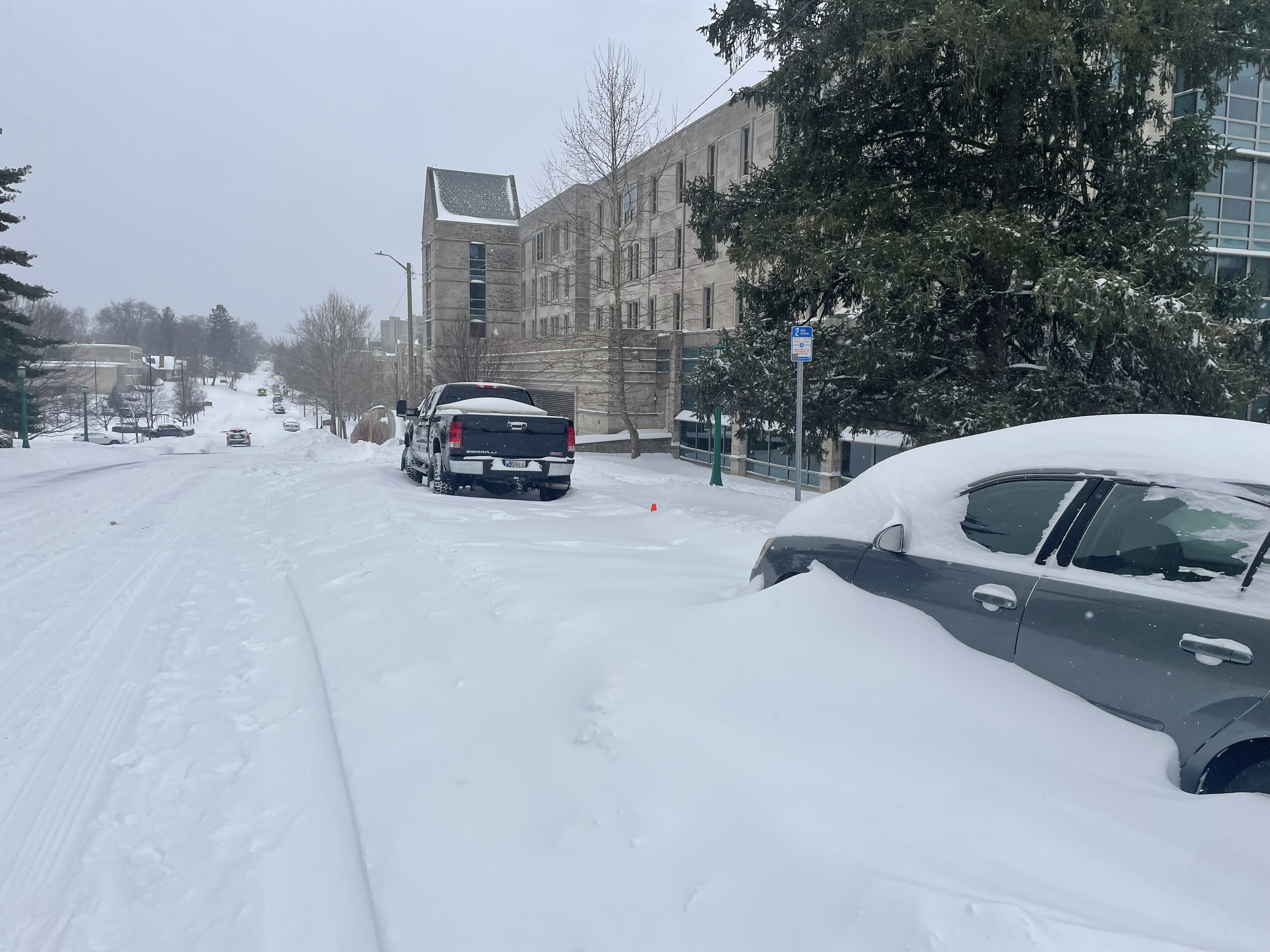
Aftermath of the storm in Bloomington, Indiana

Eastern Iowa experienced wind chill values below −40 °F (−40 °C). In Iowa, a 17-year-old died and two adults aged 24 and 25 were injured in Jefferson County after winter weather conditions caused the teenager to lose control of her car. A 51-year-old man died from cold exposure in Des Moines.

Kansas City International Airport set a daily record with 5.2 in (13 cm) on January 24, breaking the previous record set in 1956. Wichita, Kansas, also picked up a daily record of snow, at 5 in (13 cm). A 28-year-old woman died in Emporia after venturing out into the storm from a bar. Burchard, Nebraska, received 2.8 inches (7.1 cm) of snow.

During the frigid conditions leading up to the storm, a 19-year-old college student was found dead in Ann Arbor, Michigan, after going missing without a coat in frigid conditions. Elsewhere in Michigan, Grand Rapids recorded a low temperature of −19 °F (−28 °C) on the morning of January 24, which was the coldest temperature recorded in the area since 1994. That same morning, Flint recorded a low temperature of −24 °F (−31 °C), just one degree above the all-time record low for the area.

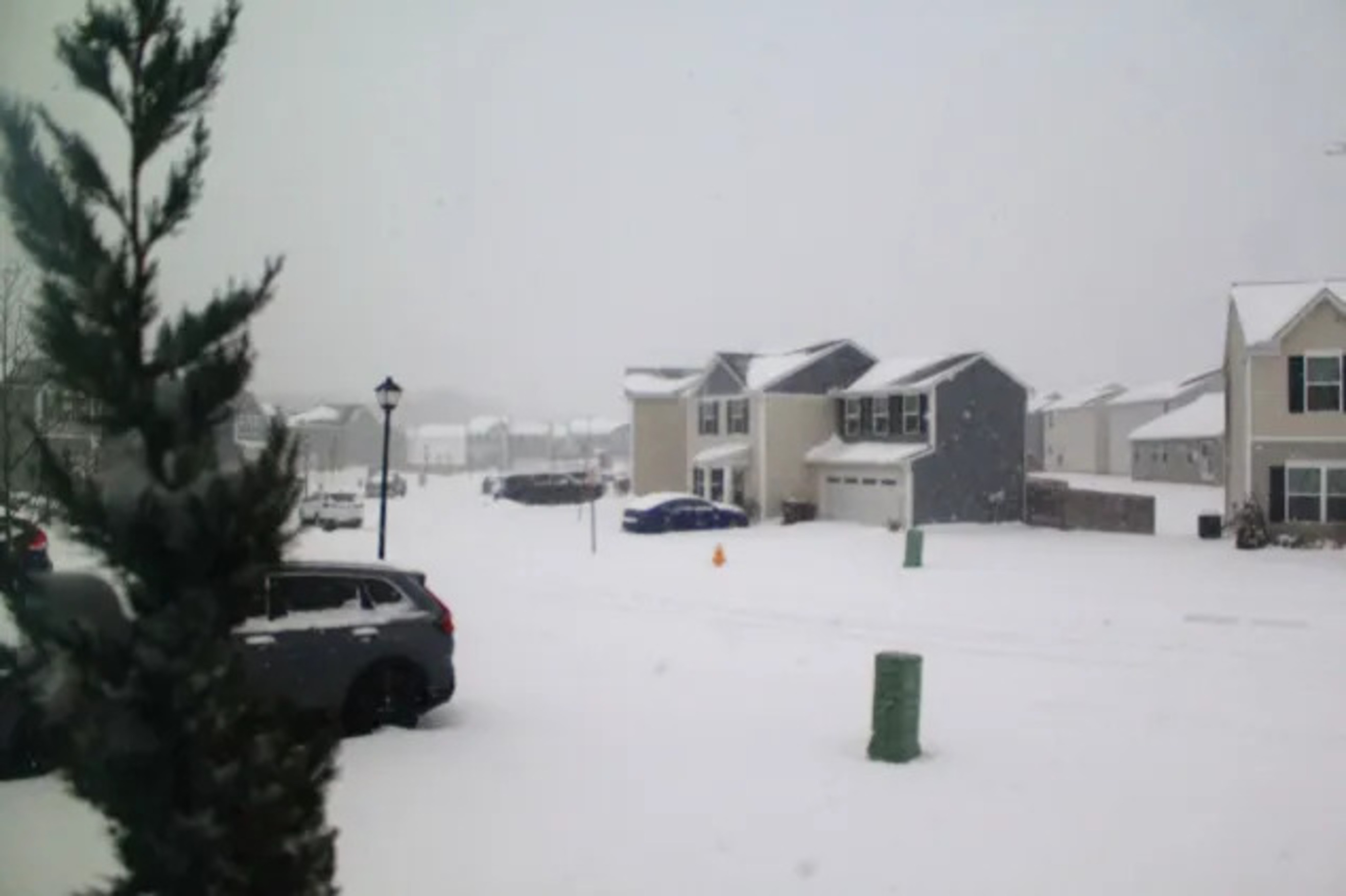
Snow accumulation in Springfield, Ohio

By the morning of January 25, states such as Indiana, Illinois, Missouri, and Ohio saw snow accumulation of up to 16 inches (41 cm). Columbus, Ohio, set a new daily snowfall record on January 25, recording 11.9 inches (30 cm). The previous daily record of 4.7 inches (12 cm) was set in 1988. Treacherous road conditions in the wake of the storm there forced the Columbus Blue Jackets to postpone their game against the Los Angeles Kings to March 9. Dayton International Airport set an all time record for daily snowfall total at 12.4 inches (31 cm) on January 25, narrowly eclipsing the original record of 12.2 inches (31 cm) set on January 26, 1978, during the Great Blizzard of 1978. One person who was plowing snow in Dayton was killed after he was run over by a snow plow vehicle, while a snowmobile driver in Fowler Township was killed after he was struck by a salt truck. The Indiana Department of Homeland Security reported 13 storm-related fatalities. Cold temperatures resulted the deaths of three in Indianapolis. A vehicular accident in the city resulted in one dead. Fatal crashes occurred in Whitley County, Elkhart, Huntington County, St. Joseph County, and LaPorte County. In Evansville, a woman was found dead in an SUV. Two died of carbon monoxide poisoning in Fulton County. A person died of hypothermia in Montgomery County.

A 64-year-old public works employee in Bartlett, Illinois, was killed after he was struck by a Metra train while clearing snow in the early morning hours of January 26. A 17-year-old was killed in a crash on SR 13 in Elkhart County, Indiana, during icy conditions. Kentucky reported 22 storm-related fatalities, including a 72-year-old woman who died from hypothermia related to the extreme cold. Parts of Kentucky reported up to 9 in (23 cm) of snow.

==== Northeast and Mid-Atlantic ====
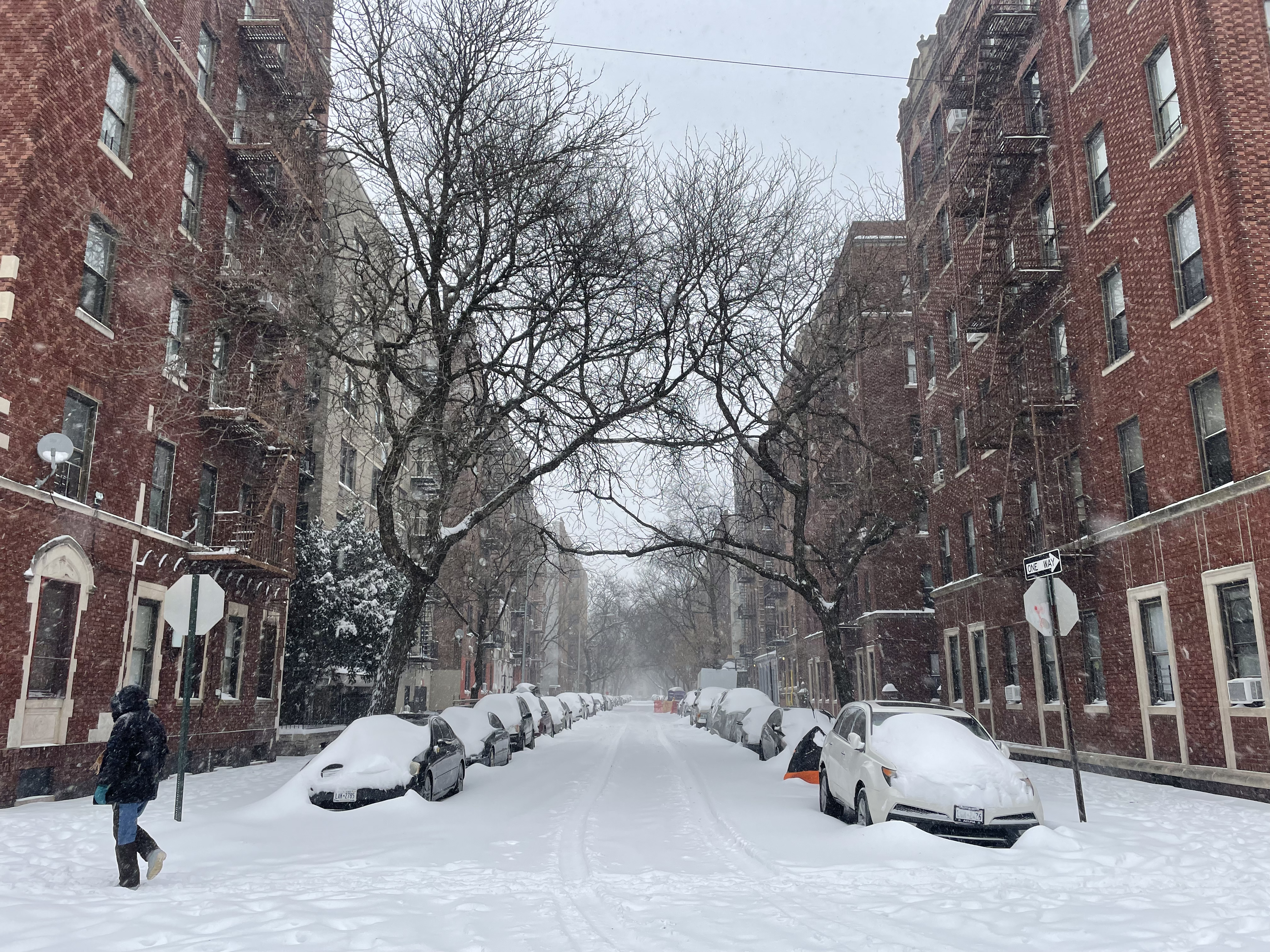
Snow at 1:41 p.m. on January 25 on Crooke Ave, Brooklyn

By 6 a.m. on January 25, 177 car crashes were reported during the storm in Virginia, 14 of those resulted in injuries. Two people were killed in accidents in Fairfax and Pittsylvania counties, but weather was reportedly not a factor in either. There was a fatality from a weather-related crash in Frederick County. The number of crashes rose to 440 by January 26 at 4 a.m. Dulles International Airport recorded 7 in (18 cm) of snow. The snowy conditions also forced the express lanes on I-95 and I-395 to close. Virginia State Police reported a total of 506 crashes and 38 injuries. There were three weather-related fatalities in Fairfax County.

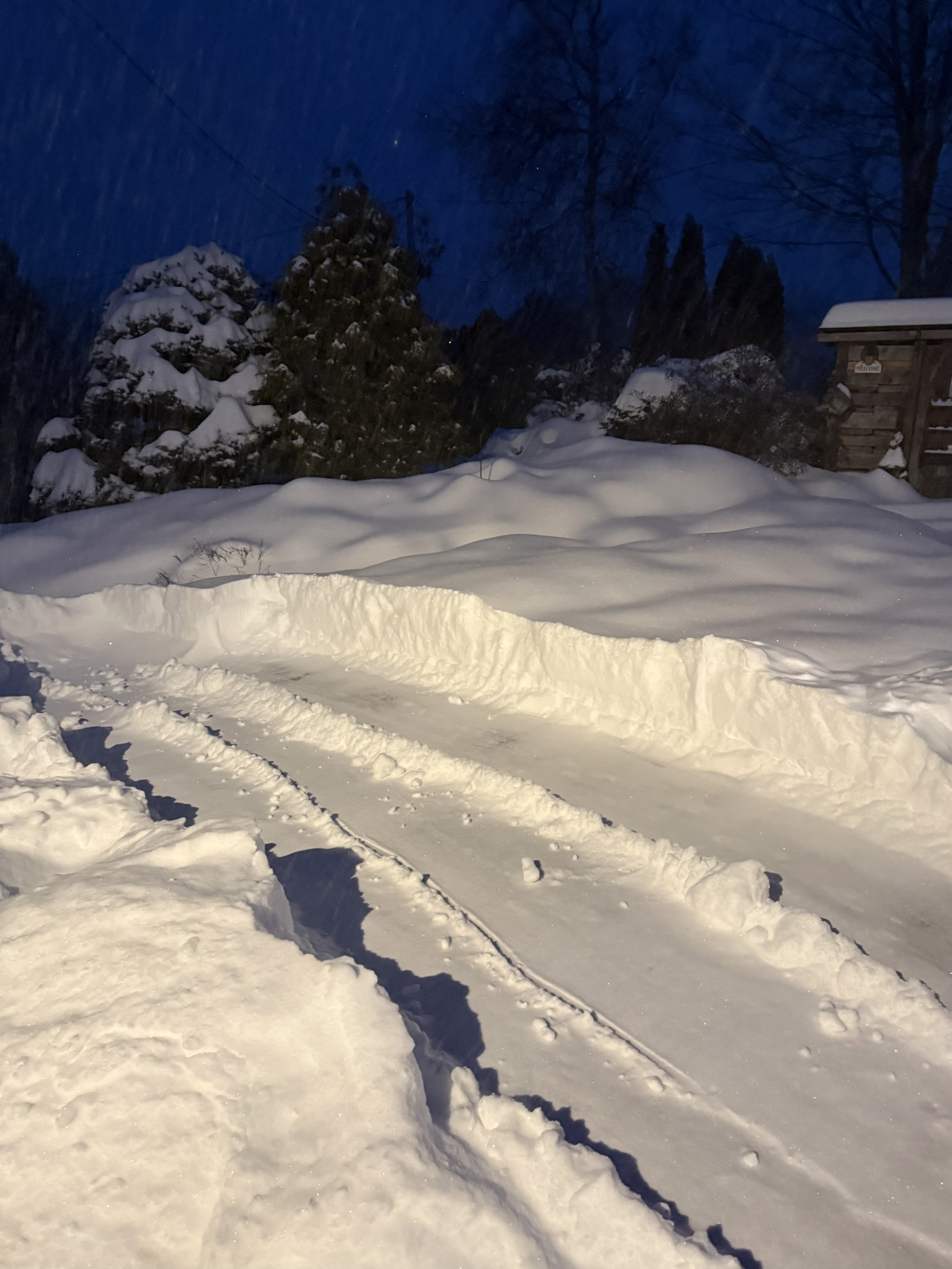
A section of a central Massachusetts residential driveway partially-cleared by a snowblower on the evening of January 25, 2026

In nearby West Virginia, snow totals in many areas were lower than was forecast, though freezing rain caused significant ice accumulation statewide. Multiple counties recorded upwards of 10 in (25 cm) of snow, with the town of Davis, Tucker County, recording 18.3 in (46 cm). Icy conditions resulted in the closure of New River Gorge National Park. The president of the West Virginia Senate reported an absence of quorum on January 26, with only four senators in attendance. Appalachian Power, which services large portions of southern West Virginia, Wheeling, and southwestern Virginia, recorded 46,000 outages amid the storm. The number of outages stood at roughly 12,000 state-wide by January 26, and 5,700 by mid-morning the following day. Among the most heavily impacted areas were Kanawha, Lincoln, Roane, Clay, Nicholas, Boone and Webster counties. About ten percent of Lincoln County residents lost power during the ice storm. An unnamed coal-fired power plant was left idle in advance of and amid the storm due to a change in the bidding process put forward by the regional transmission authority PJM. Public criticism voiced as a result of this choice led to discussion among state representatives of potentially leaving the organization entirely.

The Baltimore/Washington International Airport in Maryland saw 11.3 in (29 cm) of snow while Clarksburg saw 11.8 in (30 cm) by 9 a.m. on January 26. All state offices were closed that day as well. A private snowplow struck a man just before 1 p.m. in Anne Arundel County, causing non-life-threatening injuries. There were 6.9 in (18 cm) of snow and ice recorded in Washington D.C. As a result, federal offices were closed on January 26. All flights were grounded out of Reagan National Airport on January 25, resuming the following day. The snowstorm also forced classes to be cancelled in Washington D.C. from January 26–28, and school openings were delayed by two hours on January 29–30.

Meanwhile, Pittsburgh saw its largest snowfall since the February 5–6, 2010 North American blizzard, totaling 11.2 in (28 cm) of snow in the city. However, many areas throughout the region received well over a foot, and some areas received over 20 in (51 cm). This came as a significant part of Pittsburgh’s snowplow fleet needed repairs, causing a state of emergency to be issued the following morning as officials urged drivers to avoid driving if possible, and to stick to the main roads.

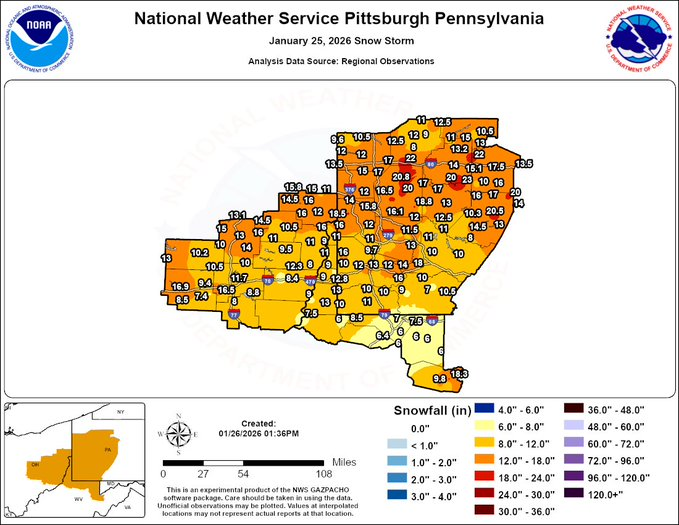
A map illustrating the snowfall reports received by the Pittsburgh branch of the NWS from the late January 2026 winter storm event. Many areas reported over a foot of snowfall, with some totalling 18 inches of snow.

Farther east, an avalanche was recorded in Duryea, Pennsylvania, due to the snowstorm. In Philadelphia, 9.1 in (23 cm) of snow fell, their highest total from a storm since the January 2016 United States blizzard. Parts of the state saw up to 20 in (51 cm) of snow. Lehigh Valley International Airport saw 11.8 in (30 cm) of snow, breaking the previous record of 10.4 in (26 cm) from 1988. Three elderly residents of Lehigh County died after experiencing medical emergencies while shoveling snow. A 67-year-old man in Verona, New Jersey, also died after having a medical emergency while shoveling snow. Numerous businesses in Philadelphia recorded significantly less business then usual due to the storm. Schools in Philadelphia were also closed from January 26–28, before finally reopening on January 29.

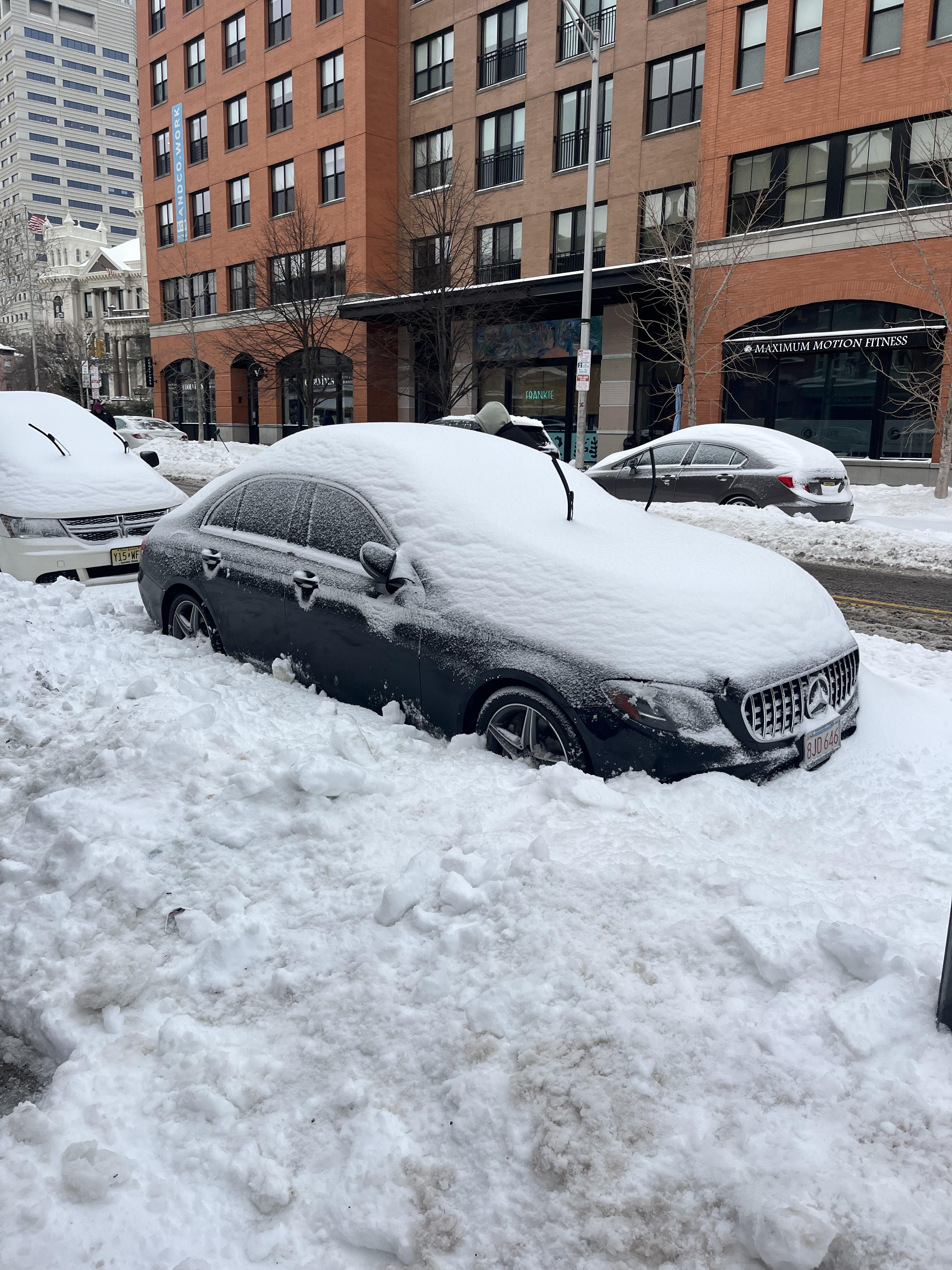
Cars in Jersey City covered by the snow

On January 25, there were eleven suspected weather-related fatalities reported in New York, with exact causes not yet disclosed. By January 31, the Mayor's Office confirmed that as many as 13 people had died on the streets of New York from exposure, most if not all of whom were homeless and/or suffering from mental illness. Mayor Zohran Mamdani stated that city outreach workers were continuing to identify, check in on, and offer assistance to potential at-risk individuals, while the city's Department of Homeless Services said that "no one who is homeless and seeking shelter in New York City during a code blue will be denied." A 60-year-old retired New York State Police officer died while attempting to shovel snow near a church in Floral Park. Central Park reported a daily record of snow, at 11.4 in (29 cm). Nearby, Torrington, Connecticut, picked up 16.5 in (42 cm) of snow. Bridgeport had its seventh snowiest day on record, dating back to 1948. Public libraries in the city were said to remain closed on January 26. Numerous other attractions also remained closed. The Citi Bike service in New York City was out of service from noon on January 25 to 10 a.m. on January 26 in New York City due to the hazardous weather. Several cities in Upstate New York, such as Albany, Binghamton and Rochester had record snowfall for January 25. The heavy snow led to travel bans for both Ulster County and Duchess County.

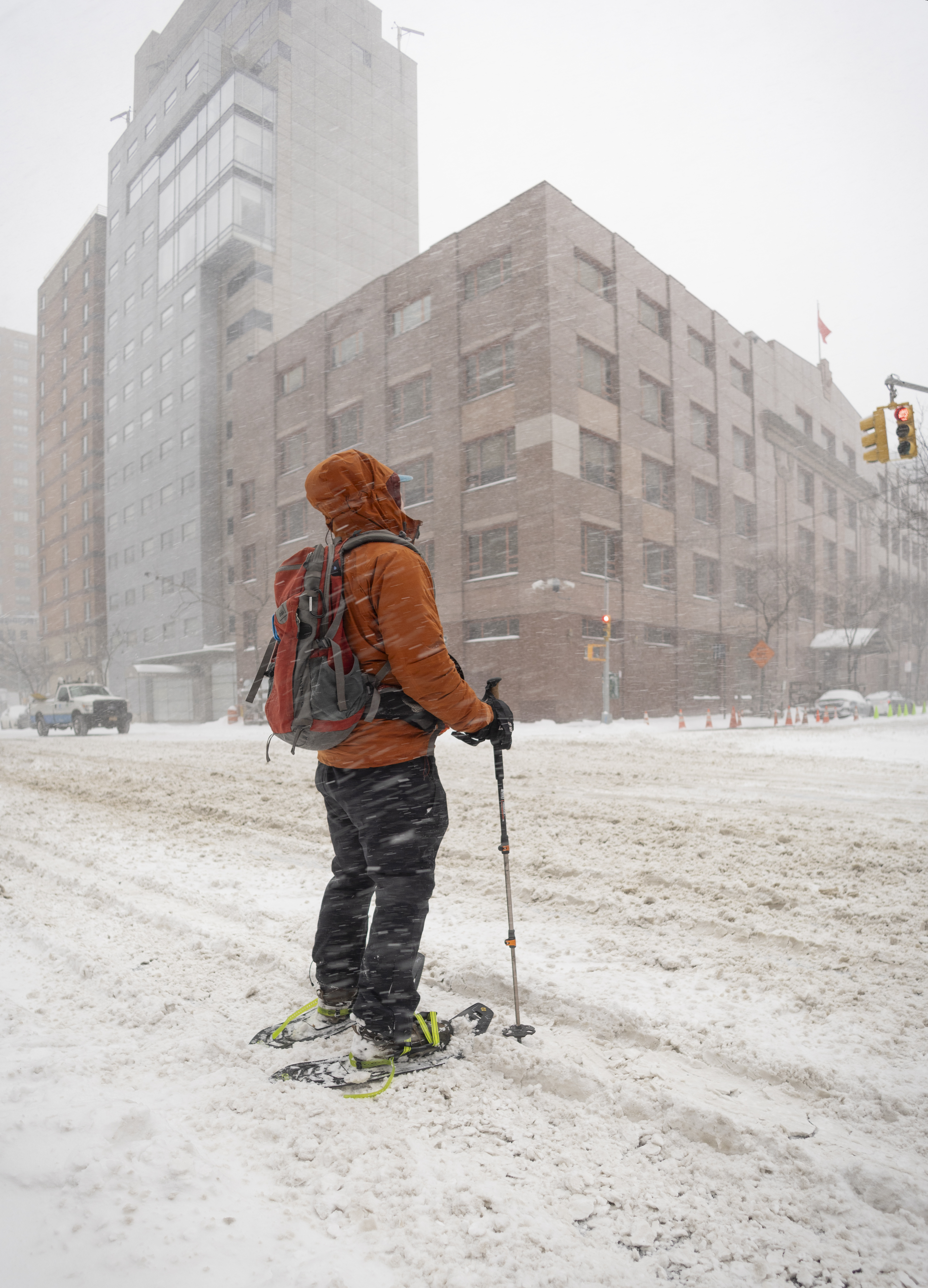
A pedestrian wearing snowshoes crosses First Avenue in Midtown Manhattan.

A snowplow truck struck and killed a woman in Norwood, Massachusetts, while walking with her husband on January 25. I-90's speed limit was reduced to 40 mph (64 km/h) in the afternoon. By 8 p.m. Massachusetts State Police responded to 149 crashes, as well as 234 disabled vehicles. Seven were injured due to the crashes. On January 25, 493 flights arriving and departing Logan International Airport were cancelled by 10:30 p.m. On January 26, over 500 flights were cancelled. Many areas received over 20 in (51 cm) of snow by early afternoon, with 22 in (56 cm) in Sterling. By 2 p.m. on January 26, 18.9 in (48 cm) of snow had been recorded at Logan International. The last time Boston saw a winter storm of 1 foot (30 cm) or more was January 29, 2022. Logan International Airport would receive a total of 23.2 in (59 cm) of snow, the eighth highest snow accumulation on record for Boston. Gloucester saw 27 in (69 cm) of snow. Between January 25 and January 26 at 4 p.m., Massachusetts State Police responded to 222 crashes, 12 of which had injuries. The department also reported 402 disabled vehicles, 13 motorist assists, seven vehicle fires, and four abandoned vehicles. The Red Line had delays on January 28 and January 29. The Commuter Rail had delays on January 29 as well as cancellations from January 27–29.

Further north, nearly 2 ft (61 cm) of snow fell in the New Hampshire Seacoast. Between 1 p.m. on January 25 and 9 p.m. on January 26, New Hampshire State Troopers responded to 46 crashes, seven causing injuries, as well as assisted 77 vehicles that went off the road and assisted roughly 38 other motorists. In total, they responded to over 160 weather-related calls. The state police also reduced speed limits on several interstates and two turnpikes. The Patrick Leahy Burlington International Airport in Vermont saw four flight cancellations by the night of January 26.

Over 20 in (51 cm) of snow was reported in Kittery, Maine. Further north in the state, a Bombardier Challenger 650 carrying six people crashed in the process of takeoff at Bangor International Airport near Bangor during winter weather conditions caused by the snowstorm, killing all occupants. The cause of the accident is currently unknown.

=== Canada ===
==== Central ====
Snow began in southern Ontario on January 25. Over 560 flights were cancelled by 3 pm at Toronto Pearson International Airport, which reported its largest single-day snowfall since records began in 1937, receiving a total of 46 cm (18 in) and a total of 61 cm (24 in) of snow accumulated in Downtown Toronto. Thirty-three flights were cancelled at the Billy Bishop Toronto City Airport. A potent lake-enhanced snow band stalled over much of Toronto for several hours, prompting Toronto to activate its major snow response plan for the second time in 2026 just prior to 5 p.m. The Ontario Provincial Police responded to around 100 car crashes over 24 hours. A Bombardier Global 6500 also skidded off the taxiway after landing at Pearson Airport; no injuries were reported. By 5:30 p.m., roughly 50 centimetres (20 in) fell in parts of the core of Toronto. This caused all Greater Toronto Area Schools and Boards to close. Many post-secondary institutions, notably the University of Toronto, York University, and Toronto Metropolitan University, also closed. In Waterloo, snow and road conditions contributed to two accidents on the Highway 7 ramp on January 26. One of the accidents resulted in minor injuries to the driver while the other resulted in a fatality. Schools and buses resumed operations on January 27.

Further east, 14 cm (5.5 in) of snow was recorded at both Ottawa and Montreal. 21 flights leaving Ottawa were cancelled by 6 a.m. on January 26 and 154 accidents occurred from the morning to 3 p.m. Via Rail saw some cancellations and delays. 3,500 Hydro-Quebec customers were without power, primarily on the Island of Montreal. Two women died in Montreal from the extreme cold during a power outage that occurred at the same time.

==== Atlantic ====
Snow fell beginning late on January 25 and until the morning of January 27 across the Maritimes. Southern New Brunswick saw 10–25 cm (3.9–9.8 in) of snow, with estimates of 25–40 cm (9.8–15.7 in) in Grand Manan. Most school closures occurred in southeastern New Brunswick. At 12:45 p.m., 45 customers were affected by three outages.

Northern and western parts of Nova Scotia saw 30–40 cm (12–16 in) of snow. The Halifax area received 21–30 cm (8.3–11.8 in) while Sluice Point recorded 42 cm (17 in) of snow. Most schools in Nova Scotia were closed on January 26. Government offices were closed until noon of January 27. Many universities had delayed openings. Most community colleges were closed or had delayed openings. All schools were closed on January 27 as well. Some flights out of the Halifax Stanfield Airport were delayed. Bad airfield conditions led the airport to temporarily suspend operations between 8 am and 11:15 a.m. Ten outages were active at 12:15 p.m. impacting 67 customers.

Prince Edward Island reported close to 15 cm (5.9 in) of snow. Saint Georges saw 27 cm (11 in) of snow. All schools were cancelled on January 27. Offices opened at 1 p.m. in the West Prince area while offices elsewhere remained closed for January 27. Some Health PEI services were suspended or delayed. Two customers were without power in Prince Edward Island at 12:45 p.m. Marine Atlantic cancelled two ferry crossings on January 27. A Bay Ferries departure was delayed.

In Newfoundland, schools were closed in the southeastern part of the Avalon Peninsula while schools in the northeast closed two hours early on January 27. At 12:30 p.m., courts in St. John's closed. Memorial University campuses closed at 1 p.m. in St. John's. Facilities in Paradise were suspended at 2 p.m. At 4:30 p.m., recreation facilities in St. John's closed. A tractor trailer jack-knifed in Appleton.

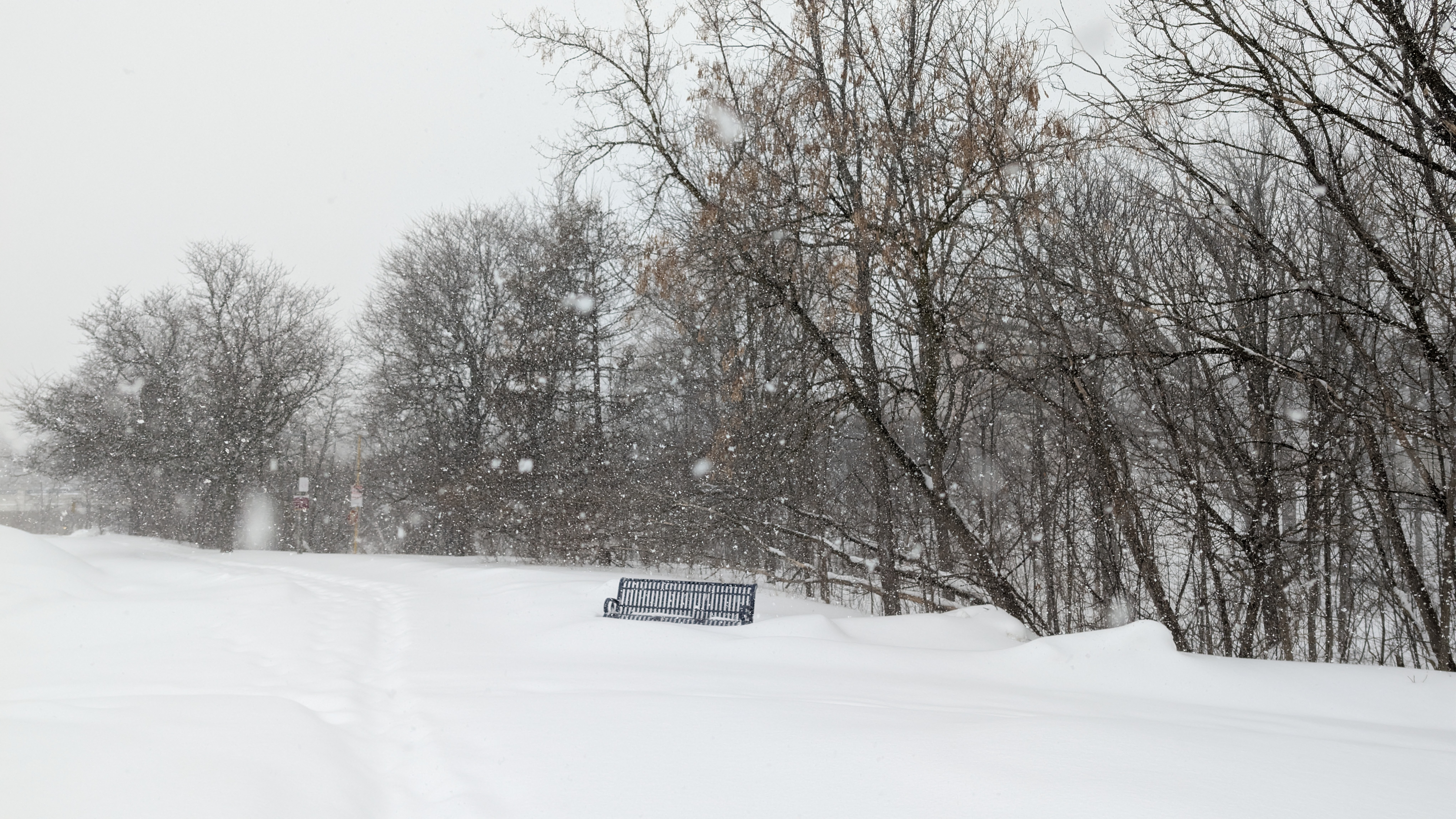
Park bench half immersed in snow in Brampton, Ontario

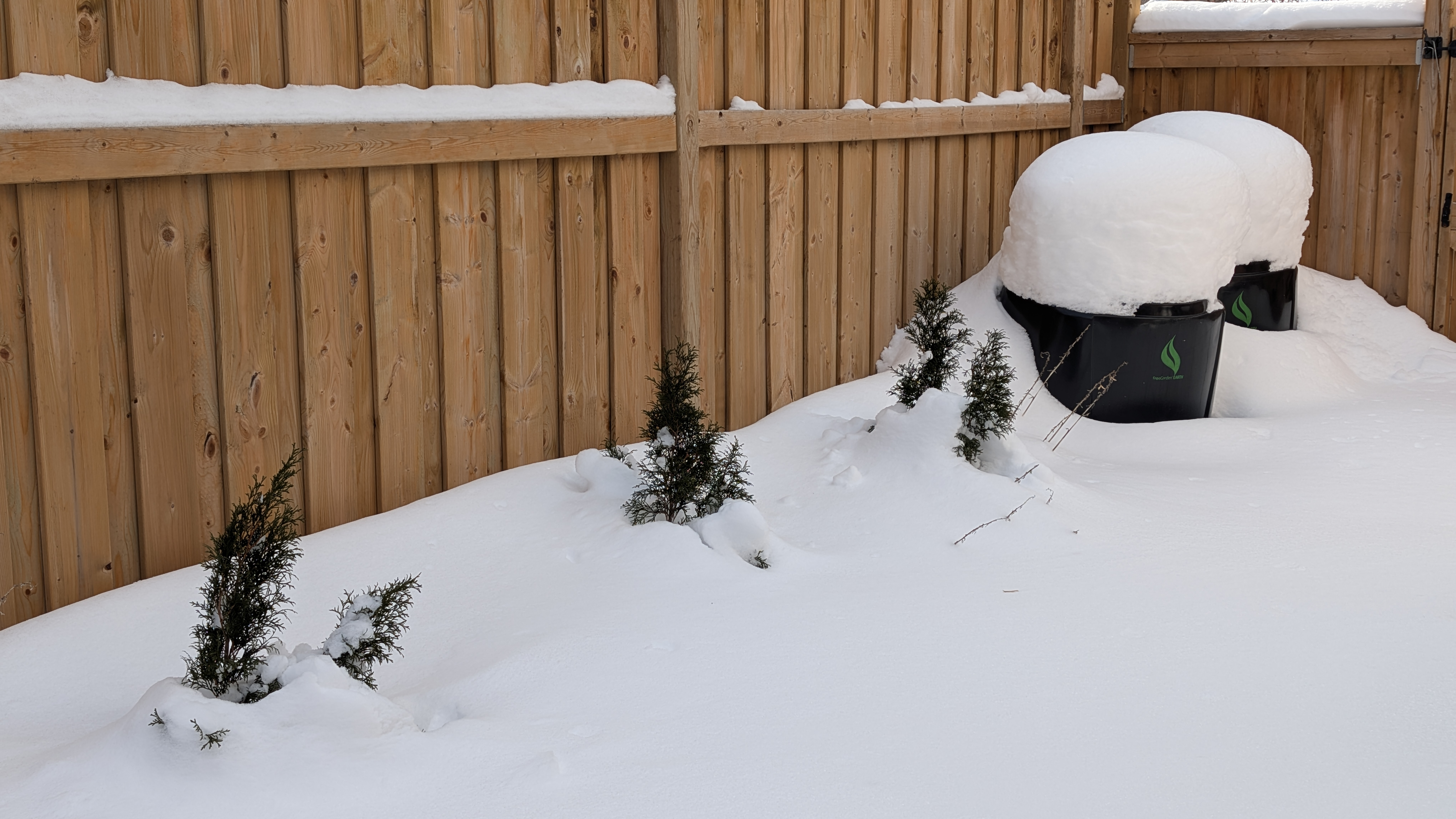
Compost bins covered with snow

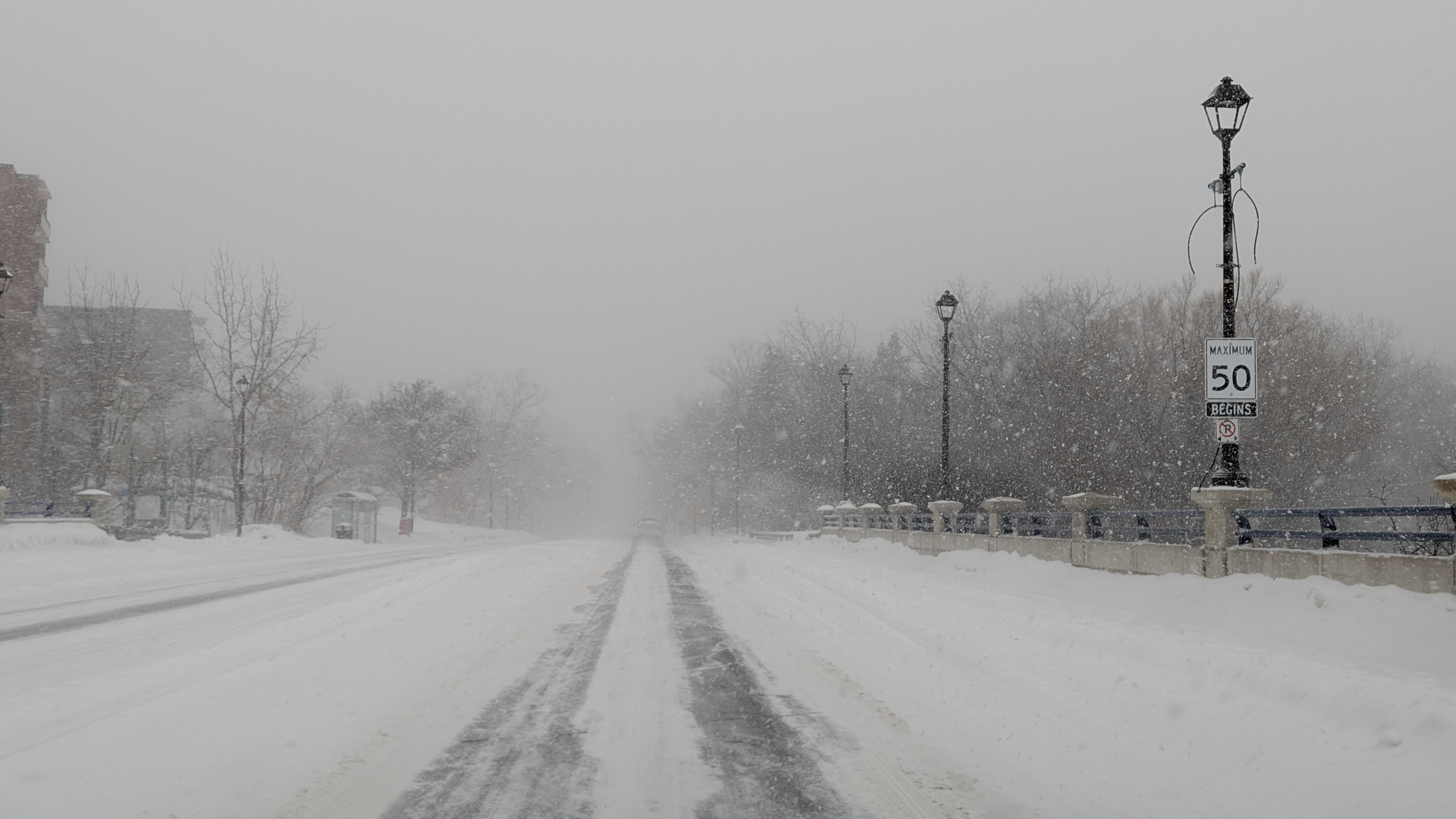
Reduced visibility in Brampton, Ontario

=== Mexico ===
Winds in Tamaulipas reached up to 56 miles per hour (90 km/h). Temperatures in Nuevo Laredo and Guerrero reached 25 °F (−4 °C). In Chihuahua, wind gusts reached 72 km/h (45 mph), forcing closures.

White-out rains and strong winds occurred in the Yucatán Peninsula on January 26. 25–50 mm (0.98–1.97 in) of rain fell in parts of Cancun, resulting in flooding. The passage of the cold front caused the temperatures in the city dropped from 29 °C (84 °F) to 24 °C (75 °F). Arctic air from the storm caused the temperature to further drop from 25 °C (77 °F) at midday to 19 °C (66 °F) at night. At least 98 flights to Cancun International were cancelled.

== See also ==
- Weather of 2026
- January–February 2026 North American cold wave
- January 1996 United States blizzard
- February 5–6, 2010 North American blizzard
- January 2016 United States blizzard
- January–February 2019 North American cold wave
- February 13–17, 2021 North American winter storm
- February 15–20, 2021 North American winter storm
- January 5–6, 2025 United States blizzard
- January 9–11, 2025 United States winter storm
- List of snowiest places in the United States by state
