= 2026 Bangor Bombardier Challenger 650 crash =

2026 aviation accident in Maine

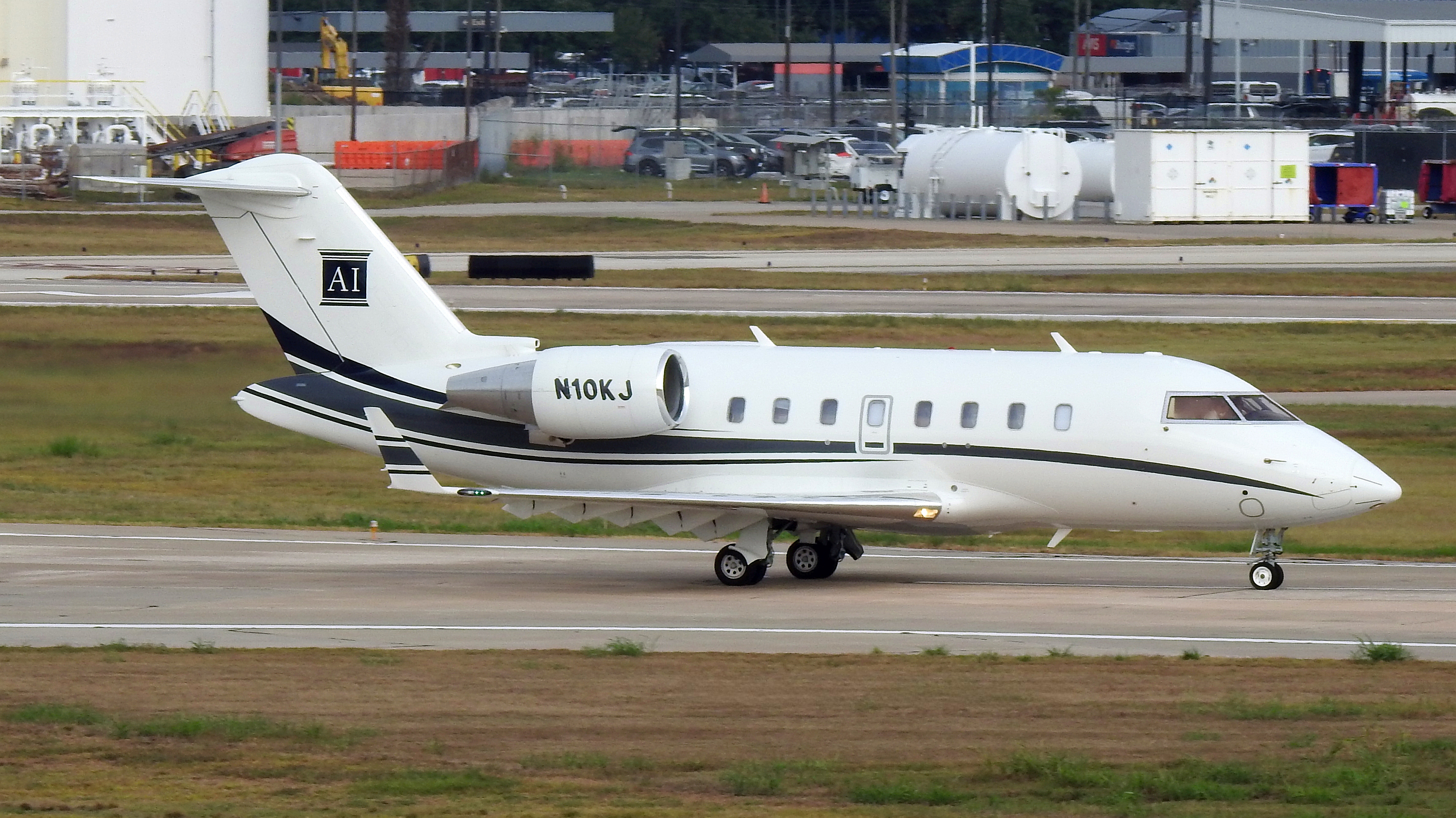
- N10KJ, the aircraft involved in the accident, pictured in 2023

Accident
- Date: January 25, 2026
- Summary: Crashed shortly after takeoff, under investigation
- Site: Bangor International Airport, Bangor, Maine, US

Aircraft
- Aircraft type: Bombardier Challenger 650
- Operator: KTKJ Challenger LLC operated for Arnold & Itkin
- Registration: N10KJ
- Flight origin: William P. Hobby Airport, Houston, Texas, United States
- Stopover: Bangor International Airport, Bangor, Maine, United States
- Destination: Châlons Vatry Airport, Châlons-en-Champagne, France
- Occupants: 6
- Passengers: 4
- Crew: 2
- Fatalities: 6
- Survivors: 0

On January 25, 2026, a private Bombardier Challenger 650 crashed, inverted and caught fire while it was attempting to takeoff from Bangor International Airport in Bangor, Maine, United States, killing all six occupants. The fire destroyed the aircraft. Weather conditions were poor at the time due to a winter storm. According to CBS News, the jet had stopped in Bangor to refuel and was headed to Châlons Vatry Airport outside of Paris, France. The flight originated from William P. Hobby Airport in Houston, Texas.

The crash is the deadliest aviation incident in Maine since Bar Harbor Airlines Flight 1808, which crashed on August 25, 1985, on final approach to Auburn/Lewiston Municipal Airport and killed all eight on board.

== Background ==
The Bombardier Challenger 650, a business jet owned by KTKJ Challenger LLC and operated for Arnold & Itkin, a Houston-based personal injury law firm, attempted to take off from Bangor International Airport in the state of Maine after refueling and crashed shortly after beginning its takeoff run. The jet was built in 2020 and registered as N10KJ.

=== Passengers and crew ===
There were six people aboard the jet: four passengers and two pilots. 47-year-old Jacob Hosmer and 33-year-old Jorden Reidel were the pilots of the flight. Passengers aboard the aircraft were Tara Arnold, Nick Mastrascusa, Shelby Kuyawa, and Shawna Collins. Arnold was an attorney, and the wife of Kurt Arnold, the co-founder of Arnold & Itkin. Collins was an event planner and an employee of Lakewood Church in Houston. Mastrascusa was a chef from Hawaii. Kuyawa was a sommelier. All worked for Beyond, a luxury travel service founded and owned by Kurt and Tara Arnold.

== Accident ==
The Bombardier was to make a charter flight from William P. Hobby Airport in Houston, Texas, to Châlons Vatry Airport in Châlons-en-Champagne, France, with a refueling stopover at Bangor International Airport in Maine. After refueling, the jet crashed shortly after starting its takeoff.

== Investigation ==
The National Transportation Safety Board (NTSB) arrived at the scene on January 27, and began conducting their investigation at that time. The airport remained closed until January 29, 2026. Much of the wreckage remained under a foot (0.3 m) of snow in the days immediately following the incident, and the victims' remains were not removed from the wreckage until January 29 due to the snow cover.

The NTSB took at least 38 hours to get to the wreckage. The NTSB defended its response time, with spokesperson Stephanie Sulick telling the Portland Press Herald "We get there as fast and as safely as we can. Just because they're not on scene doesn't mean they're not doing investigative work."

The Aircraft Owners and Pilots Association released a preliminary report blaming a delay between deicing and takeoff for the crash.
