= Bangor House =

- U.S. National Register of Historic Places
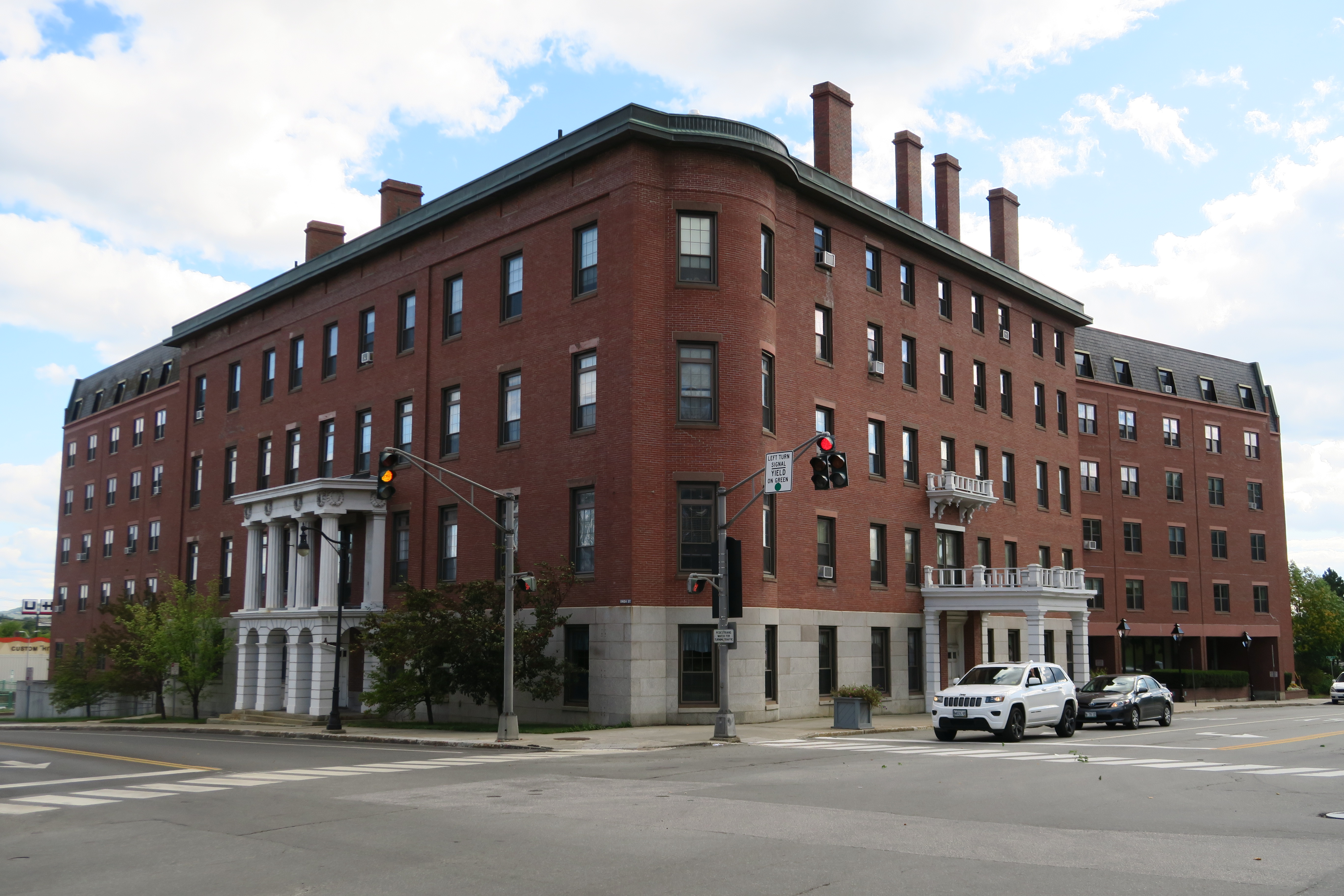
- Bangor House in Bangor, Maine

- Location within Maine Location within the United States
- Location: 174 Main St., Bangor, Maine, U.S.
- Coordinates: 44.7984°N 68.7724°W
- Area: 3 acres (1.2 ha)
- Built: 1833
- Architect: Rogers, Isaiah
- Architectural style: Greek Revival, Italianate
- NRHP reference No.: 72000076
- Added to NRHP: February 23, 1972

Bangor House is a historic former hotel at 174 Main Street in downtown Bangor, Maine. Built in 1833-34 and repeatedly enlarged, the hotel was a major fixture in the city, and one of the nation's early high-class hotels. It was later converted into apartments.

== History ==
The building is located on the south side of downtown Bangor, at the southeast corner of Main and Union Streets. The U-shaped building occupies a slightly irregular city block, and is bounded on its southern sides by May Street and Gallagher Place. It is a four-story building, built out of brick and stone, with the ground floor of its early sections built out of granite blocks, with brick walls above. Porticoed entrances face both Union and Main Streets, with a stone arcade on the ground floor supporting a four-column porch on Union Street and a simpler balustraded portico with supporting square stone columns and pilasters facing Main Street. A small balcony with large Italianate brackets stands above the Main Street entrance on the third floor.

The hotel was built in 1833–34 by a group of Bangor businessmen, seeking to create a public accommodation similar to that of the Tremont House in Boston, an 1829 hotel that was then regarded as one of the pinnacles of luxury accommodation. The main building has retained its exterior despite a significant number of later alterations and enlargements. Originally built in a U open to the south, the inside of the U was in 1869 filled in with a billiard hall, and wings were added to the east and south. Many of the additions have since been torn down as part of the building's conversion to apartments, replaced by residential wings that now give the building an east-facing U shape.

It was listed on the National Register of Historic Places on February 23, 1972.

== See also ==
- National Register of Historic Places listings in Penobscot County, Maine
