= Bangor International Airport =

Airport in Bangor, Maine, USA

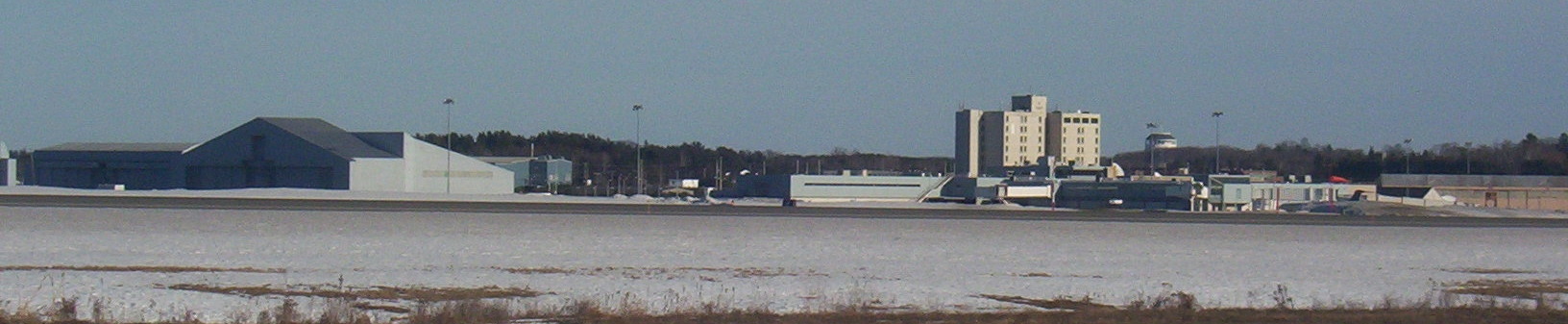
- View of terminal apron
- IATA: BGR; ICAO: KBGR; FAA LID: BGR

Summary
- Airport type: Public
- Owner/Operator: City of Bangor
- Serves: Bangor, Maine, Central & Northern Maine
- Elevation AMSL: 192 ft (59 m)
- Coordinates: 44°48′26″N 068°49′41″W
- Website: www.flybangor.com

Maps
- FAA airport diagram
- Interactive map of Bangor International Airport

Runways
Direction	Length		Surface
Direction	ft	m	Surface
15/33	11,440	3,487	Asphalt

Helipads
Number	Length		Surface
Number	ft	m	Surface
H1	100	30	Concrete

Statistics (2025)
- Aircraft operations: 41,642
- Based aircraft: 32
- Total passengers: 860,000
- Source: Federal Aviation Administration

Bangor International Airport (IATA: BGR, ICAO: KBGR, FAA LID: BGR) is a joint civil-military public airport on the west side of the city of Bangor, in Penobscot County, Maine, United States. Owned and operated by the City of Bangor, the airport has a single runway measuring 11,440 by 200 ft (3,487 by 61 m). Originally a military installation known as Dow Air Force Base, Bangor remains the home of the 101st refueling wing of the Maine Air National Guard. Most Air Force operations at the base ceased in the 1960s. Covering 2,079 acres (841 ha) the airport is categorized by the Federal Aviation Administration's (FAA) National Plan of Integrated Airport Systems (2023–2027) as a non-hub primary commercial service facility.

The airport's location on major air corridors between Europe and the East Coast of the United States make it a common spot for diverted flights, as well as military charter flights.

Bangor International is operated as an "enterprise fund", which means that the expense of operating it comes from airport revenue. Revenues are generated by air service operations, resident aviation-related industrial companies, real estate, cargo, international charter flights, and corporate/general aviation traffic. One of three international airports in the state, it serves the residents of central, eastern, and northern Maine, as well as parts of Canada.

It was designated by NASA as an emergency landing site for the Space Shuttle.

== History ==
=== 20th century ===
Bangor International Airport began as Godfrey Field in 1921, on land owned by local attorney Edward Rawson Godfrey (1877–1958). On August 19, 1923, 15 Martin Bombers and 11 DeHaviland Scout Planes under the command of Gen. Billy Mitchell — virtually the entire U.S. Army Air Corps — landed there on a practice mission.

Regular air passenger service to Portland and Boston began in 1931 by Boston-Maine Airways, owned by the Boston and Maine and Bangor and Aroostook railroads and under contract to Pan American, which was interested in the airport as a stop on its planned intercontinental air route between the U.S. and Europe. Amelia Earhart travelled to Bangor on the first flight of Boston-Maine Airways, in which she was an investor, in 1933. The airport was equipped with floodlights for night flights as early as 1937. In 1940, Boston-Maine became Northeast Airlines, which eventually merged with Delta Air Lines in 1972.

1941 saw the first fatal crash of a military aircraft in Maine, when a Douglas B-18 Bolo bomber stationed at Bangor Army Airfield went down in nearby Springfield, killing all four crew. Between 1941 and 1971, there were 14 additional fatal crashes of military aircraft based in Bangor, three within city limits and the rest in small towns or wilderness areas between the north woods and the coast.

Just before World War II, Godfrey Field was taken over by the Army Air Corps and became the Bangor Army Air Field. It was operated until 1968 as Dow Air Force Base, and still later as Bangor Air National Guard Base.

In 1948, Bangor was one stop on the round-the-world flight of Richarda Morrow-Tait, the first woman to pilot a plane around the globe. She landed at Dow but took off for the next leg (to Canada) from the airport in nearby Old Town. The Canadian authorities refused her permission to hop the Atlantic and ordered her back to Bangor. She defied them and completed the trip.

In 1958, the Air Force constructed its current 11,440 ft runway for the B-52 Stratofortress. At the time, it was the longest runway on the east side of the Mississippi River.

In the 1950s and 1960s, Bangor was a destination for Northeast Airlines before its merger into Delta. Northeast usually used the Douglas DC-6 for service between Bangor and Boston and New York. In 1965, there was still a single weekly DC-3 flight to Bangor operated by Northeast Airlines.

In 1968, Dow AFB was closed as an active duty Air Force installation. Most of the base was purchased by the city and reopened the following year as Bangor International Airport. The portion of Dow AFB not turned over to the city became the basis for the current Air National Guard Base and the Maine Army National Guard's Army Aviation Support Facility.

In October 1969, Trans World Airlines Flight 85 which had been hijacked in California refueled in Bangor on its way to Rome, where the hijacker was captured.

From the 1970s into the 1990s, the airport attracted 3,000 to 5,000 commercial flights a year, mostly charter jetliners flying between Europe and the West Coast of the United States, or the Caribbean and Mexico. Bangor was a logical refueling stop, and as a U.S. port of entry, passengers could go through customs and immigration checks while their plane was being serviced. Travelers from every part of the world mingled in the airport lounge — from the French and Belgian contingents of the Elvis Presley Fan Club on their way to Memphis to President José López Portillo of Mexico on his way to Moscow with members of his military staff. Laker Airways, World Airways, Lot Polish Airlines, Aeroméxico, British Airways, Balair, Condor Airlines, LTU International, Capitol International Airways, Aeroflot, and Pan American were a few of the companies whose livery became common in the skies above Bangor. Finnair briefly used Bangor as a hub for regularly scheduled daily flights.

Bangor also had mainline scheduled jets on Northeast Airlines, and subsequently Delta in the 1970s with flights to Portland and Boston. By the 1980s, USAir and United also began mainline service into BGR. Continental briefly had 1 mainline MD-80 jet to Newark Liberty International Airport in 1991–1992 to complement their propjet Continental Express service to Newark and Presque Isle.

In 1977, Erwin Kreuz, a 50-year-old West German brewery worker on his way to San Francisco, stepped off a refueling charter flight in the mistaken belief that he had reached his destination. Speaking no English, he spent four frustrating days in Bangor looking for San Francisco landmarks before realizing he was not in California. When his story made local and then national news, Bangorians were so delighted with his error that he received the key to the city, met the governor of Maine, was made an honorary member of the Penobscot Indian tribe, received a marriage proposal, and was given a gift of local land. The San Francisco Chronicle paid his way to California, where he was similarly feted, and he was invited back to Bangor the following year to help open the Bangor Mall.

In 1980, major renovations were launched to the airport. Estimated to cost around $1 million, the domestic terminals were upgraded, a two floor addition was made to the international terminal, and new conveyor belts for luggage were constructed. The project was completed in May 1981.

In 1992, it was the launch site for the Chrysler Trans-Atlantic Challenge Balloon Race. The Belgians won, but the American team, taking a more southerly track to avoid inclement weather, inadvertently became the first to pilot a balloon from North America to Africa, landing just east of Casablanca, Morocco, setting new endurance and distance records in the process.

In October 1995, Vice President Al Gore and Russian Prime Minister Viktor Chernomyrdin held a brief summit at the airport to discuss economic cooperation.

Bangor has been the port of entry for over a million servicemen and women returning from the Gulf War, the Iraq and Afghanistan wars, and the NATO operations IFOR and SFOR in Bosnia and Herzegovina on military charters. Starting in 1991, local veterans and interested citizens formed a group of troop greeters to avoid the situation of the Vietnam War, when soldiers returned without ceremony or greeting. The civilian-driven "ceremony of return" in Bangor has been well organized and often ebullient. In 2006, former President Bill Clinton spontaneously joined the line of troop-greeters when his private plane made a refueling stop.

=== 21st century ===
In 2003, Delta Air Lines added daily connection flights to Cincinnati-Northern Kentucky International Airport and Boston Logan International Airport. In 2006, the airline added direct flights to Atlanta Hartsfield–Jackson International Airport aboard McDonnell Douglas MD-88 jets. When Delta merged with Northwest Airlines, it dropped service from Bangor to these destinations and replaced them with daily connection flights to New York–LaGuardia Airport and Detroit Wayne County Metropolitan Airport (now discontinued).

In November 2007, Allegiant Air began offering flights to Florida. Destinations included Orlando–Sanford International Airport, and Saint Petersburg-Clearwater International Airport, a secondary airport near Tampa.

In April 2008, the airport received a US$2.9 million grant from the Federal Aviation Administration (FAA) to upgrade the terminal building and aviation equipment. Started in June 2008 and completed in spring 2009, the construction added passenger space for gates two and three. There are also new passenger accommodations beyond the security checkpoint, including bathrooms and food and beverage vendors.

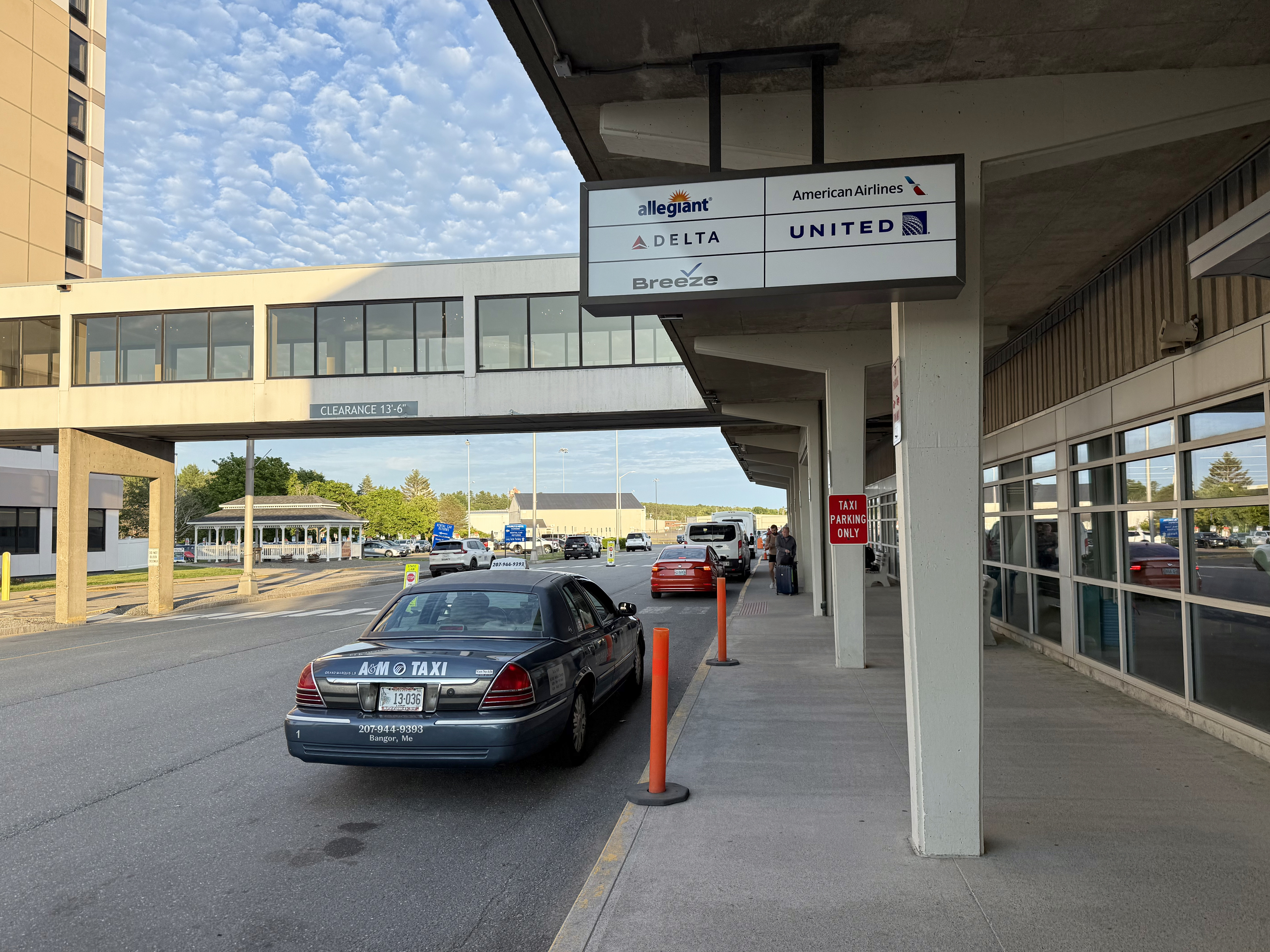
Dropoff area

In 2014, Bangor International started a $10 million modernization of the main terminal's first floor. Construction was slated for completion in spring 2016.

Most regular flights out of Bangor are connections to relatively close destinations. Other kinds of service include World Airways charter flights to cities in or outside the U.S. Most World Airways flights used the Douglas DC-10 until it was replaced with McDonnell-Douglas MD-11s, which generally operate from the mostly unused International Terminal next to the busy domestic terminal.

British Airways sometimes brings charter flights from London–Heathrow on Boeing 747s or other aircraft.

North American Airlines, operated by Global Aviation Holdings, Inc., frequently used Bangor International to transport U.S. troops on Boeing 767-300ERs to Europe. The airline since went bankrupt.

On July 8, 2010, ten captured Russian spies (members of the "Illegals Program"), were deported on a government-chartered jet that took off from New York's LaGuardia Airport bound for Vienna International Airport, with a stop in Bangor for fuel.

Delta Air Lines, the airport's largest carrier, saw a 33% decline in passengers in May 2011.

Between 2010 to 2015, an average of about 470,000 passengers boarded at the airport each year.

In 2024, the airport announced a $45 million runway repair project with an estimated completion time of two years, and allocated an additional $14.2 million for upgrades to the post-security terminal areas.

=== Diversion destination ===
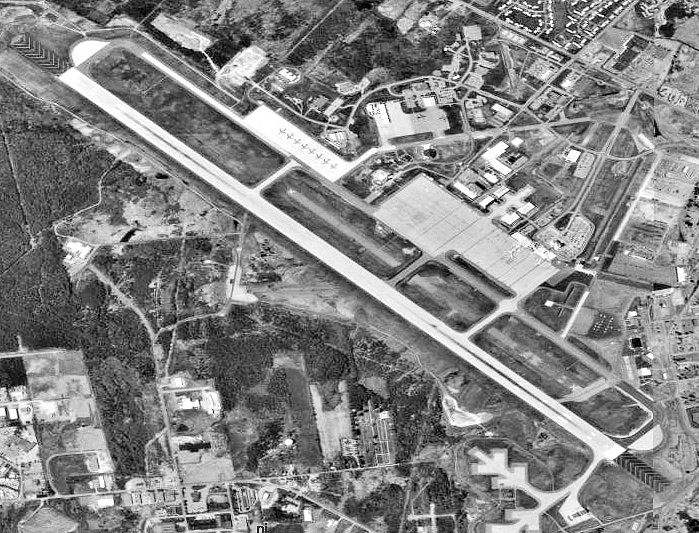
Aerial view of Bangor International Airport

Bangor is the first major American airport encountered by airliners approaching the United States from the east and the last for airliners heading towards Europe. With a runway that is greater than two miles (3.2 km) long and an uncluttered airspace, it offers a place to land in case of bad weather at an airplane's destination, bomb threats, or passengers who prove unruly or are discovered to be on the Transportation Security Administration's No Fly List. Between 2004 and May 2012, the airport handled 647 unscheduled landings: 388 for fuel, 139 for weather, 50 for medical reasons, 49 for maintenance problems, and 21 for security reasons. Because of its experience, the airport is able to quickly assemble firefighters, ambulances, police officers, and federal agents to meet such planes. During their involuntary visit to Maine, passengers receive food and donated cell phones to make calls. The airport receives $2,000 to $3,000 in handling and fuel fees, so it makes a small profit for each diverted flight.

Pilots occasionally use Bangor to prepare fuel estimates for transatlantic flights to North American destinations, since they can divert to Bangor if the fuel load proves insufficient.

Transatlantic flights are sometimes diverted to Bangor when they have mechanical trouble. Among those who have made unscheduled stops for that reason are former President George H. W. Bush and Colin Powell, and actors Clint Eastwood and Harrison Ford.

One notable security example was the September 2004 diversion for singer Cat Stevens and his daughter. In May 2001, Bangor handled two such flights from Britain within three hours. A Britannia Airways Boeing 767 to Cancún, Mexico, landed at Bangor on a Friday about noon. Three hours later, a British Airways Boeing 747 heading to Mexico City did the same.

== Current service ==
Bangor International Airport has up to 30 daily departures through Allegiant Air, American Airlines, Breeze Airways, Delta Air Lines, and United Airlines.

Since the Iraq War, Bangor has also been busy with transcontinental and transatlantic military charter flights making refueling stops. Once in Bangor, planes often disembark military passengers, refuel, reload the troops and take off to air bases elsewhere in the U.S. or overseas.

== Airlines and destinations ==
=== Passenger ===
Airlines	Destinations
Allegiant Air	Orlando/Sanford, St. Petersburg/Clearwater; Seasonal: Fort Lauderdale, Punta Gorda (FL)
American Airlines	Seasonal: Charlotte, Philadelphia, Washington–National
American Eagle	Philadelphia, Washington–National; Seasonal: Chicago–O'Hare, New York–LaGuardia
Breeze Airways	Orlando, Tampa; Seasonal: Fort Myers, Raleigh/Durham
Delta Air Lines	Seasonal: Atlanta
Delta Connection	New York–JFK, New York–LaGuardia; Seasonal: Detroit
United Airlines	Seasonal: Denver
United Express	Newark; Seasonal: Chicago–O'Hare

== Statistics ==
=== Top destinations ===
Busiest domestic routes from BGR (September 2025 – August 2026)
Rank	Destination city	Passengers	Carriers
1	Philadelphia, Pennsylvania	69,220	American
2	(New York (state)) New York–LaGuardia, New York	65,670	American, Delta
3	(Virginia) Washington–National, D.C.	63,440	American
4	Chicago–O'Hare, Illinois	54,870	American, United
5	Charlotte, North Carolina	45,460	American
6	Orlando–Sanford, Florida	42,610	Allegiant
7	Newark, New Jersey	37,250	United
8	St. Petersburg/Clearwater, Florida	30,330	Allegiant
9	(New York (state)) New York–JFK, New York	18,720	Delta
10	Tampa, Florida	10,350	Breeze

=== Carrier shares ===
Carrier shares (September 2025 – August 2026)
Carrier	Passengers (arriving and departing)
American Airlines	217,000(23.13%)
Allegiant Air	171,000(18.25%)
Endeavor Air	137,000(14.59%)
PSA Airlines	116,000(12.33%)
Republic Air	105,000(11.25%)
Other	192,000(20.45%)

== Military operations ==
In addition to regular operations by the 101st Air Refueling Wing of the Maine Air National Guard and other aviation operations by the Maine Army National Guard, Bangor is often the first or last stop on U.S. soil for troops headed to or from Iraq, Afghanistan or other overseas destinations.

== Ground transportation ==
Bangor International Airport is located off I-95. The airport is served by local taxi and limousine services as well as various rental car companies.

The Community Connector provides bus service between the airport and the surrounding region. Bus services to Portland, Boston, and Northern Maine operated by Concord Coach and Cyr Bus Lines are located about one mile from the airport.

== Accidents ==
- On August 22, 2025, a Cessna A185F Skywagon with registration number N714HE crashed during an attempted landing. While landing during gusty crosswinds, the plane veered left and into a precision approach path indicator (PAPI) light. The plane then went airborne again before striking the airport's permitter fence. The pilot and only person on board, died in the crash.
- On January 25, 2026, a Bombardier CL-600-2B16 Challenger 650 with registration number N10KJ operated by KTKJ Challenger LLC crashed during takeoff. The aircraft came to rest inverted and on fire. All six people on board the aircraft were killed in the accident.

== In popular culture ==
Bangor International Airport was the main ground setting for Stephen King's novella The Langoliers, which was made into a two-part television miniseries. The miniseries was filmed there.

It was also briefly shown in the Family Guy episode "The Hand That Rocks the Wheelchair".

== See also ==
- List of airports in Maine
- Maine World War II Army Airfields
