= 2022–23 North American winter =

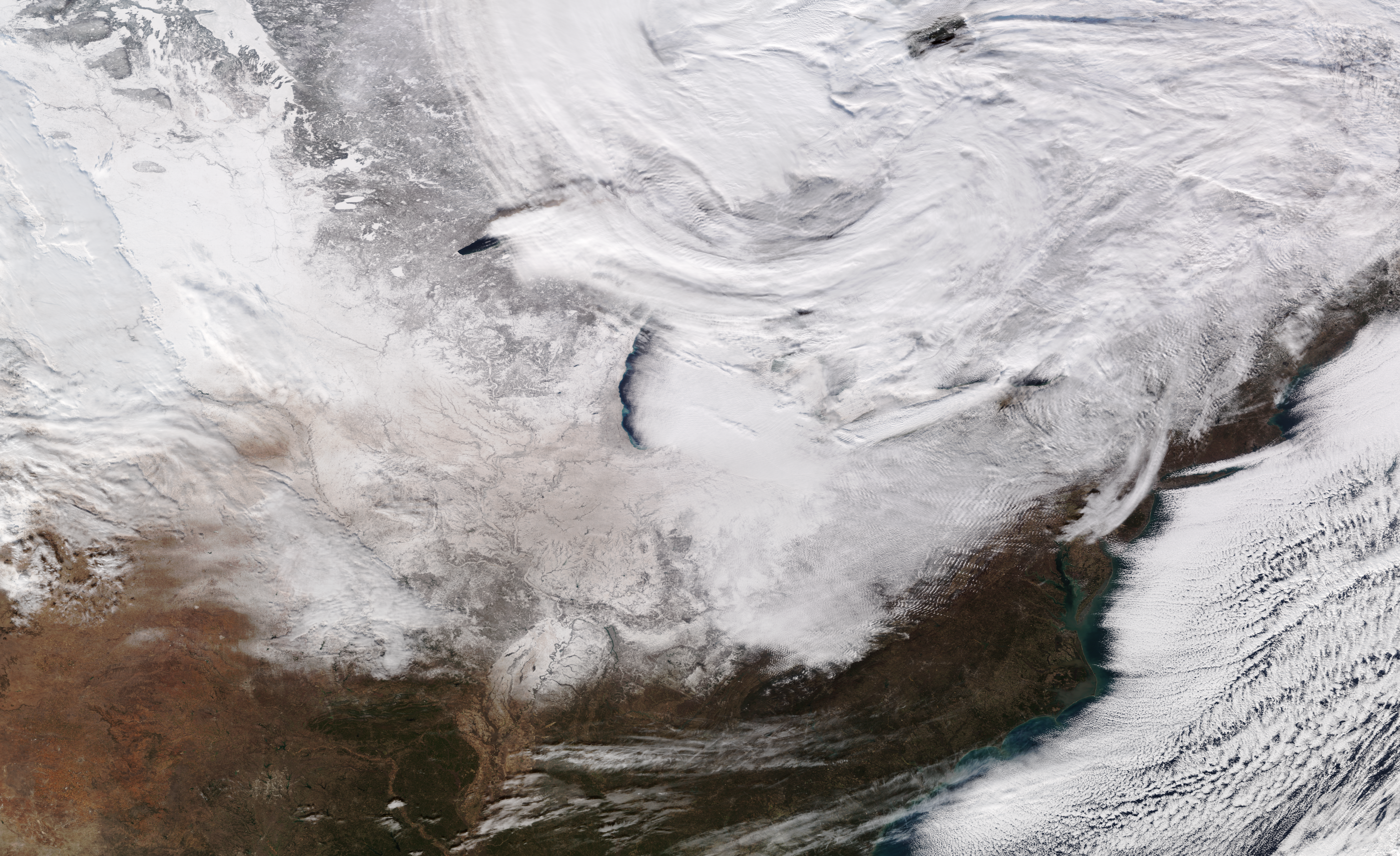
- Aftermath from a powerful blizzard in December 2022

Seasonal boundaries
- Meteorological winter: December 1 – February 28
- Astronomical winter: December 21 – March 20
- First event started: October 17, 2022
- Last event concluded: May 3, 2023

Most notable event
- Name: December 2022 North American blizzard
  - Duration: December 21–26, 2022
  - Lowest pressure: 963 mb (28.44 inHg)
  - Fatalities: 106 fatalities
  - Damage: $8.5 billion (2022 USD)

Seasonal statistics
- Total WPC-issued storms: 19 total
- Rated storms (RSI) (Cat. 1+): 5 total
- Major storms (RSI) (Cat. 3+): 2 total
- Maximum snowfall accumulation: 81.2 inches (206 cm) in Hamburg, New York (November 16–21, 2022)
- Maximum ice accretion: ≈1 inch (25 mm) near Westwood Colony, South Dakota (November 9–11, 2022)
- Total fatalities: 182 total
- Total damage: $19.36 billion (2023 USD)

Related articles
- 2022–23 European windstorm season

The 2022–23 North American winter was quite warm for the eastern half of North America, with much of the Eastern United States experiencing one of their warmest and least snowy winters on record. Despite this, numerous significant events still occurred, including a severe lake-effect winter storm across the Great Lakes region in mid-November, a cold wave bringing extremely cold temperatures to the Northeast in early-February, and several tornado outbreaks throughout the winter. However, most of the winter's damage and fatalities were due to a crippling and historic blizzard that wreaked havoc across the majority of the United States and parts of Canada in late-December. Additionally, the Western United States was colder than usual in contrast to the east, with a series of atmospheric rivers through December to March bringing widespread flooding in California and record amounts of snow across the region. During the winter, the Weather Prediction Center tracked 19 significant winter weather events, while five storms have been ranked on the Regional Snowfall Index (RSI), two of which attained the “Major” category. Similar to the previous two winters, a La Niña was expected to influence weather patterns across the continent.

While there is no well-agreed-upon date used to indicate the start of winter in the Northern Hemisphere, there are two definitions of winter which may be used. Based on the astronomical definition, winter begins at the winter solstice, which in 2022 occurred on December 21, and ends at the March equinox, which in 2023 occurred on March 20. Based on the meteorological definition, the first day of winter is December 1 and the last day February 28. Both definitions involve a period of approximately three months, with some variability. Winter is often defined by meteorologists to be the three calendar months with the lowest average temperatures. Since both definitions span the calendar year, it is possible to have a winter storm spanning two different years.

== Seasonal forecasts ==
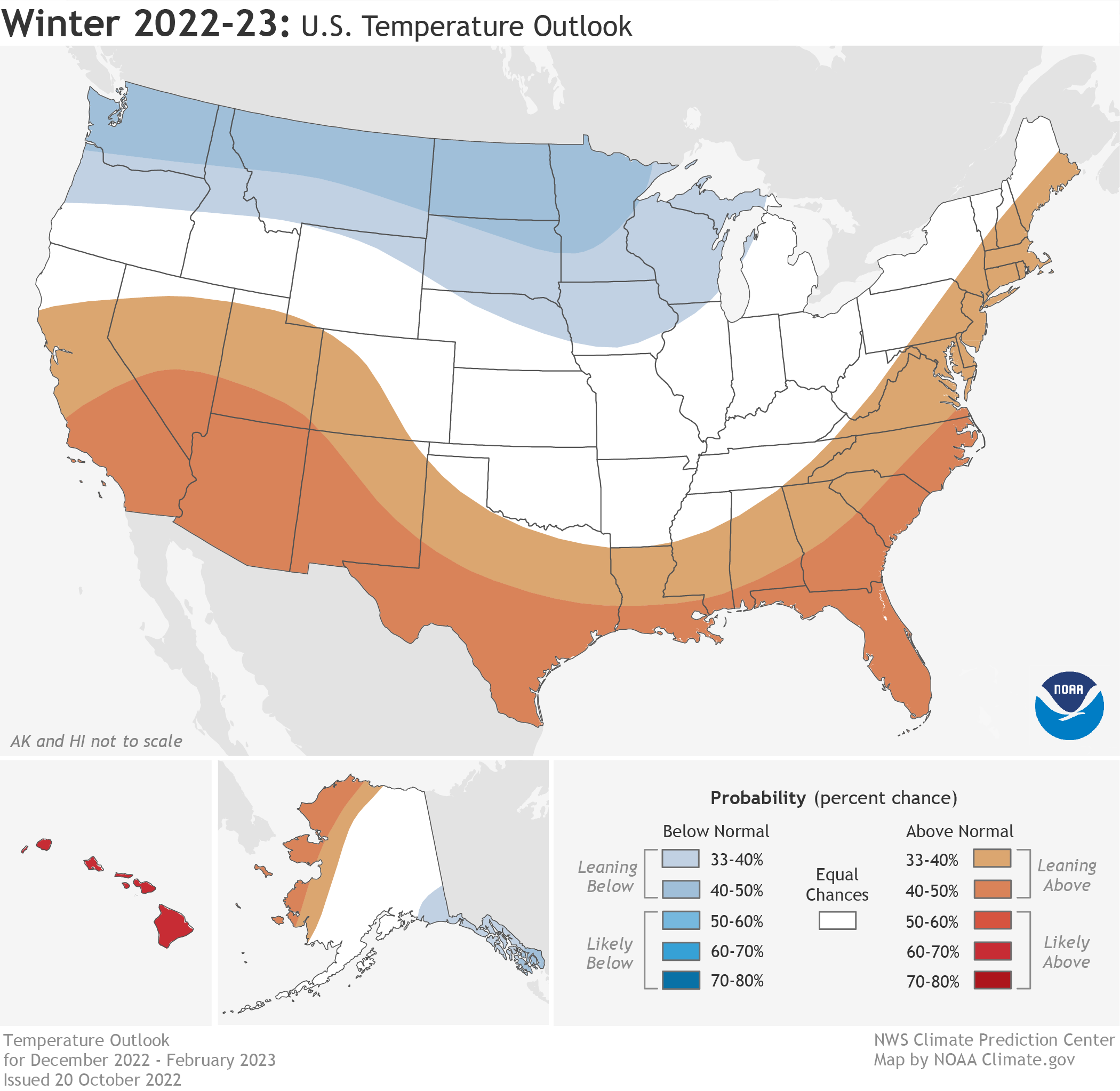
U.S. Temperature outlook

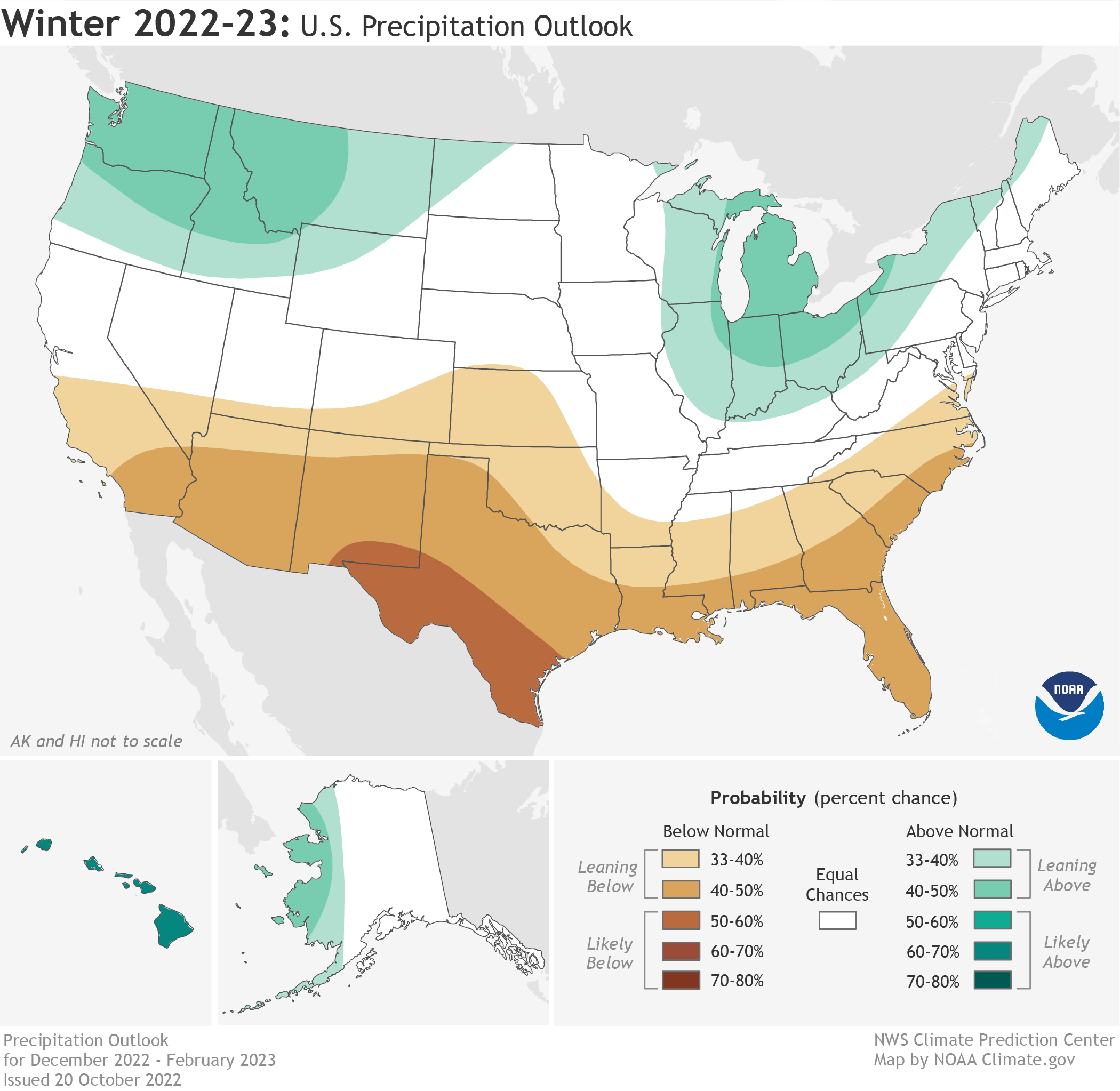
U.S. Precipitation outlook

On October 20, 2022, the National Oceanic and Atmospheric Administration's Climate Prediction Center released its outlook for the upcoming winter in the United States. Temperatures were favored to be below normal in the Pacific Northwest and Northern Plains, and above normal in the Southwestern United States, Southeastern United States and Northeastern United States. Temperatures were forecast to be above average in Hawaii and near average across most of Alaska. Precipitation was forecast to be above normal in the Pacific Northwest and Great Lakes region, and below normal in the Southwestern United States and Southeastern United States. Western Alaska was forecast to have above normal precipitation, as was Hawaii.

== Seasonal summary ==
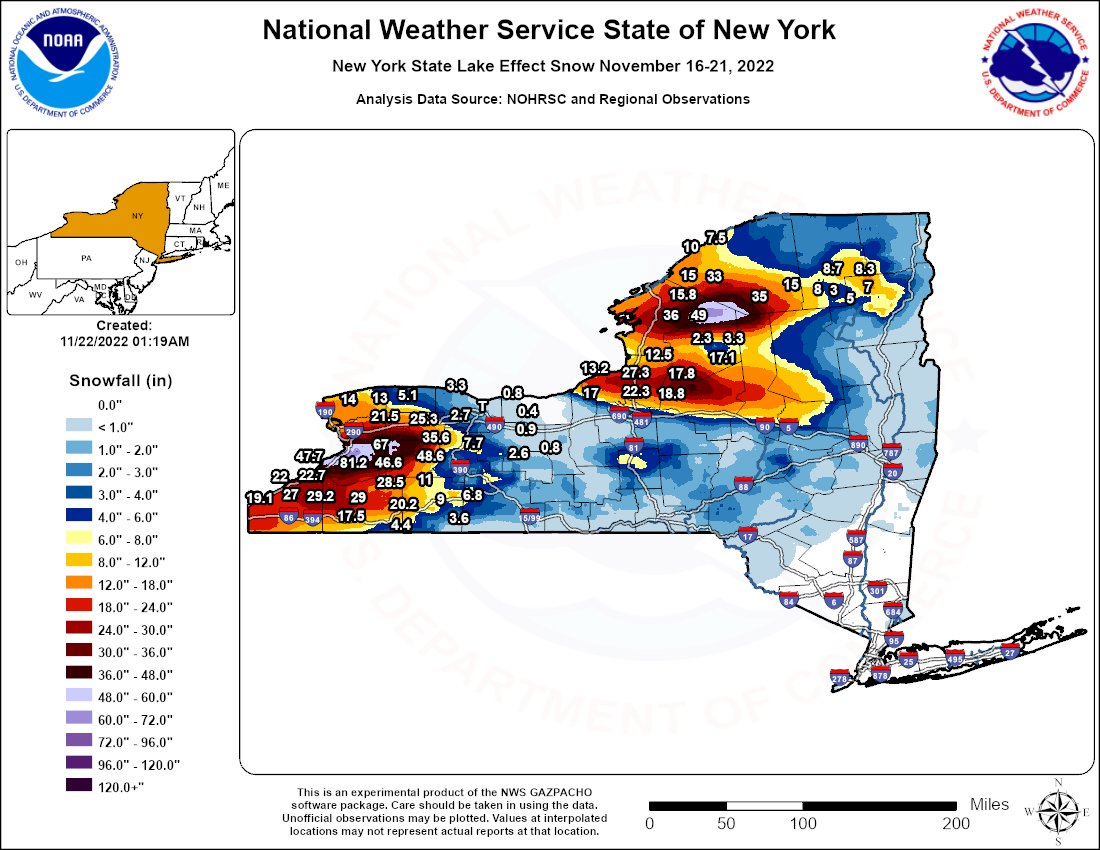
November 16–21, 2022, snowfall totals in New York

On October 17, a minor early-season cold-core low impacted the Upper Peninsula of Michigan, with some areas receiving 12–18 inches (30–46 cm) of snow, and over 30,000 customers losing power. This resulted in the heaviest October snow on record for Marquette, Michigan across a two-day period. Over the next few days, cold air pushed south, breaking records in the Midwest and Deep South. For the first time in history, Tallahassee, Florida froze before Denver, Colorado. On November 4, a winter storm on the backend of a tornado outbreak led to a 100-car pileup in Denver forcing 6th Avenue to close. The crash led to 13 injuries, one of which was serious. In Amarillo, Texas, the temperature dropped to 35 °F (2 °C), allowing for rare early-season snowflakes. On November 9, a major winter storm struck North Dakota, leading to a pileup causing several injuries on Interstate 94. An intense lake-effect snowstorm produced massive snow accumulations, primarily situated in the Buffalo area, with the highest total of snowfall peaking 81.2 in (206 cm) in Orchard Park, New York. Prior to the Christmas holiday, another snowstorm occurred, which led to 106 deaths, 41 in the Buffalo area alone. On January 8, icy roads in Iowa led to a car crash, killing 2. On February 1, New York City finally picked up 0.4 in (1.0 cm) of snow, their latest date for first snowfall on record. That storm also dropped 0.3 in (0.76 cm) in Philadelphia and 0.2 in (0.51 cm) in Baltimore. Heavy snow resulted in Mesa Verde National Park being shut down for 3 days in mid-February.

== Events ==
=== Early November blizzard ===
- Category 0 "Nuisance" (RSI/NOAA: N/A)
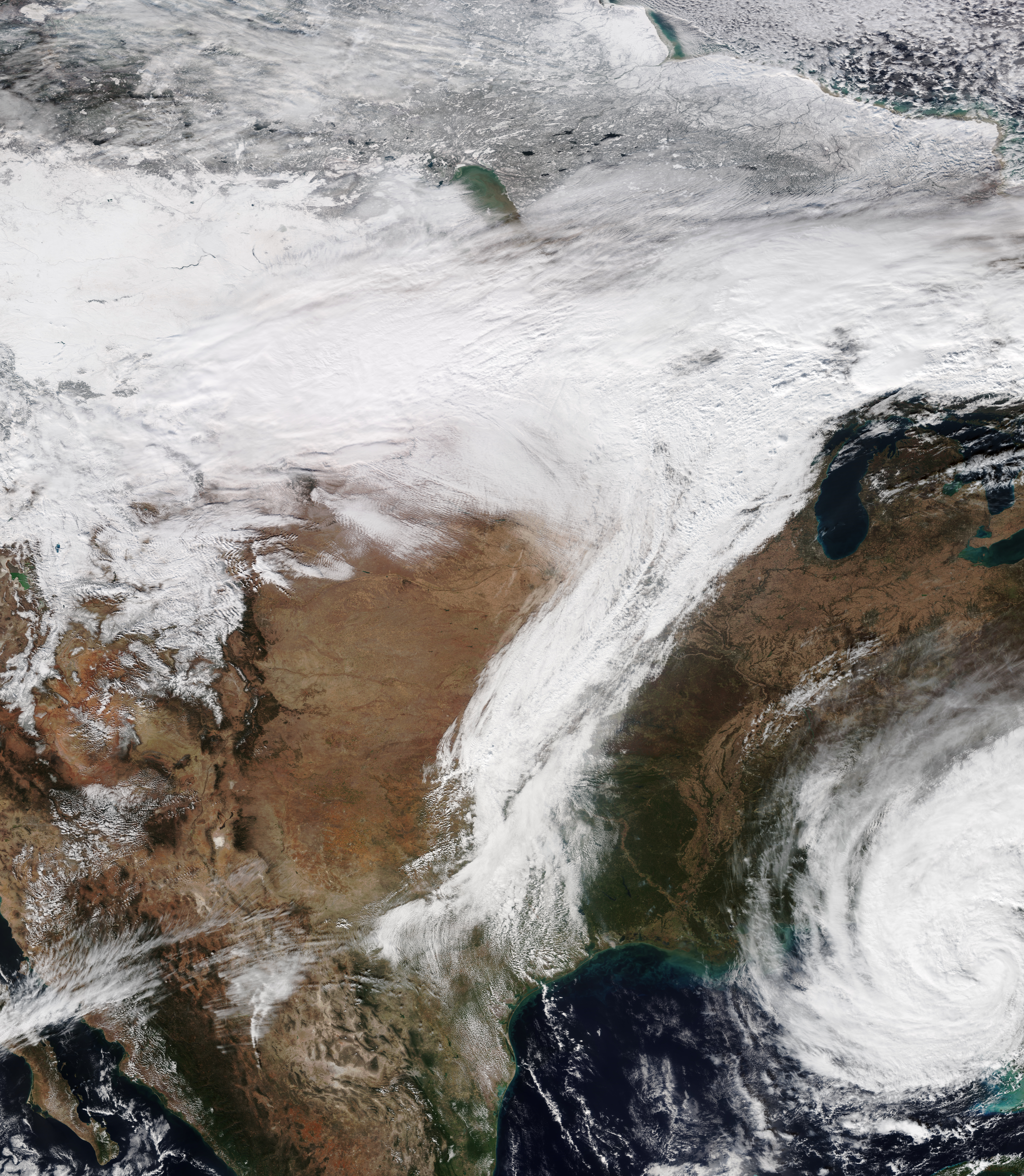
- Duration: November 9 – November 11, 2022
- Lowest pressure: 1002 mb (29.59 inHg)
- Maximum snow: 24 in (61 cm)

Starting late on November 9, a significant blizzard affected the Midwestern United States. The Storm Prediction Center issued a Mesoscale Discussion 1938 stating portions of North Dakota and Minnesota would have 1 to 2 inches (2.5 to 5.1 cm) snowfall rates per hour for much of the day on November 10. On November 10, 0.5 to 1 inch (1.3 to 2.5 cm) of ice was reported west-northwest of Westwood Colony, South Dakota. On Interstate 94 in North Dakota, a pileup of at least two dozen cars resulted in “numerous” injuries, but no fatalities. Between Fargo and Grand Forks, portions of Interstate 29 closed. 7 inches (18 cm) of snow was reported in Ralph, South Dakota. In Bismarck, North Dakota, 17.0 inches (43 cm) fell, making it the second snowiest day in Bismarck on record. The Winter Storm was unofficially named Winter Storm Alejandra by The Weather Channel.

=== Mid-November winter storm ===
- Category 0 "Nuisance" (RSI/NOAA: N/A)
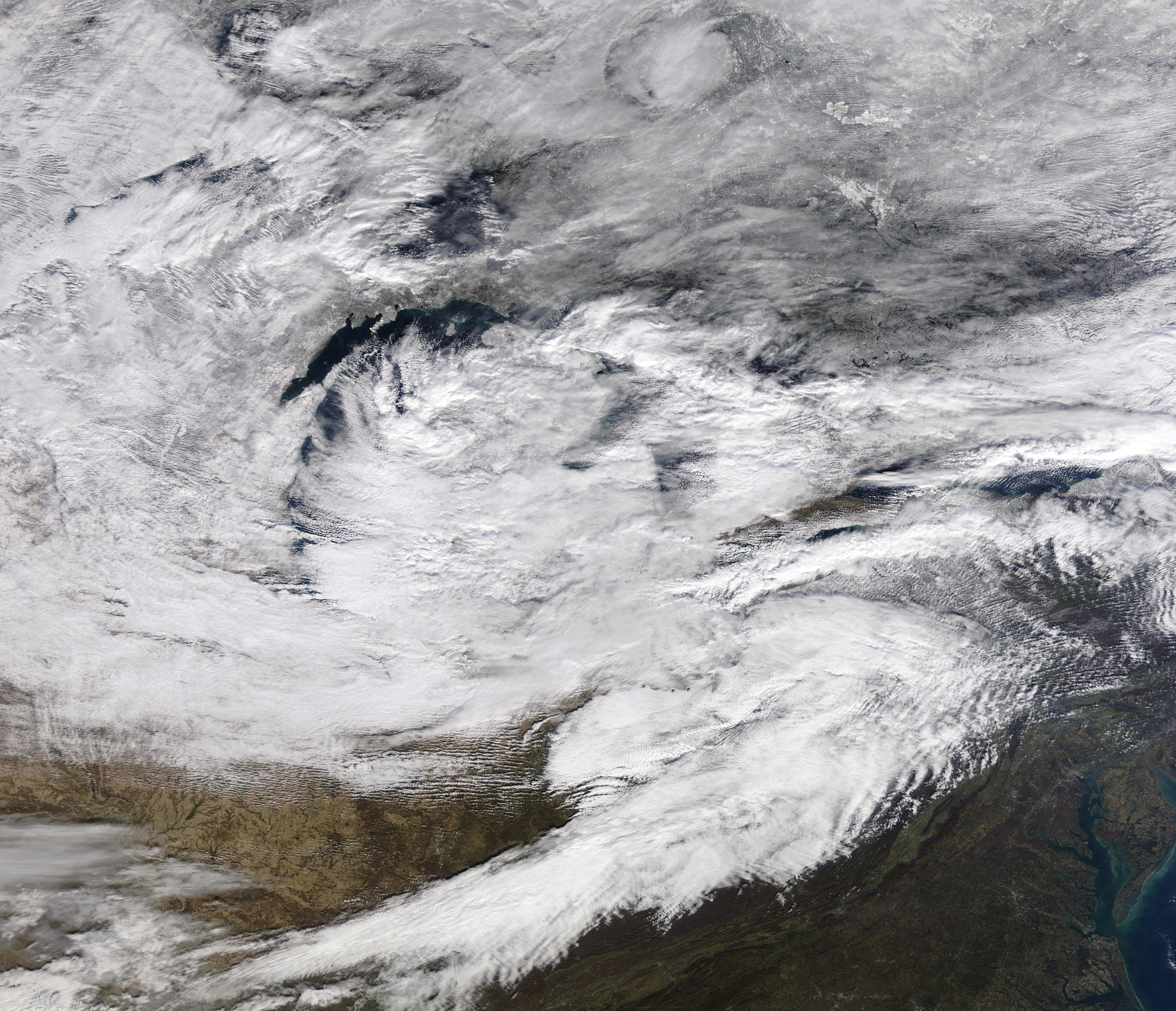
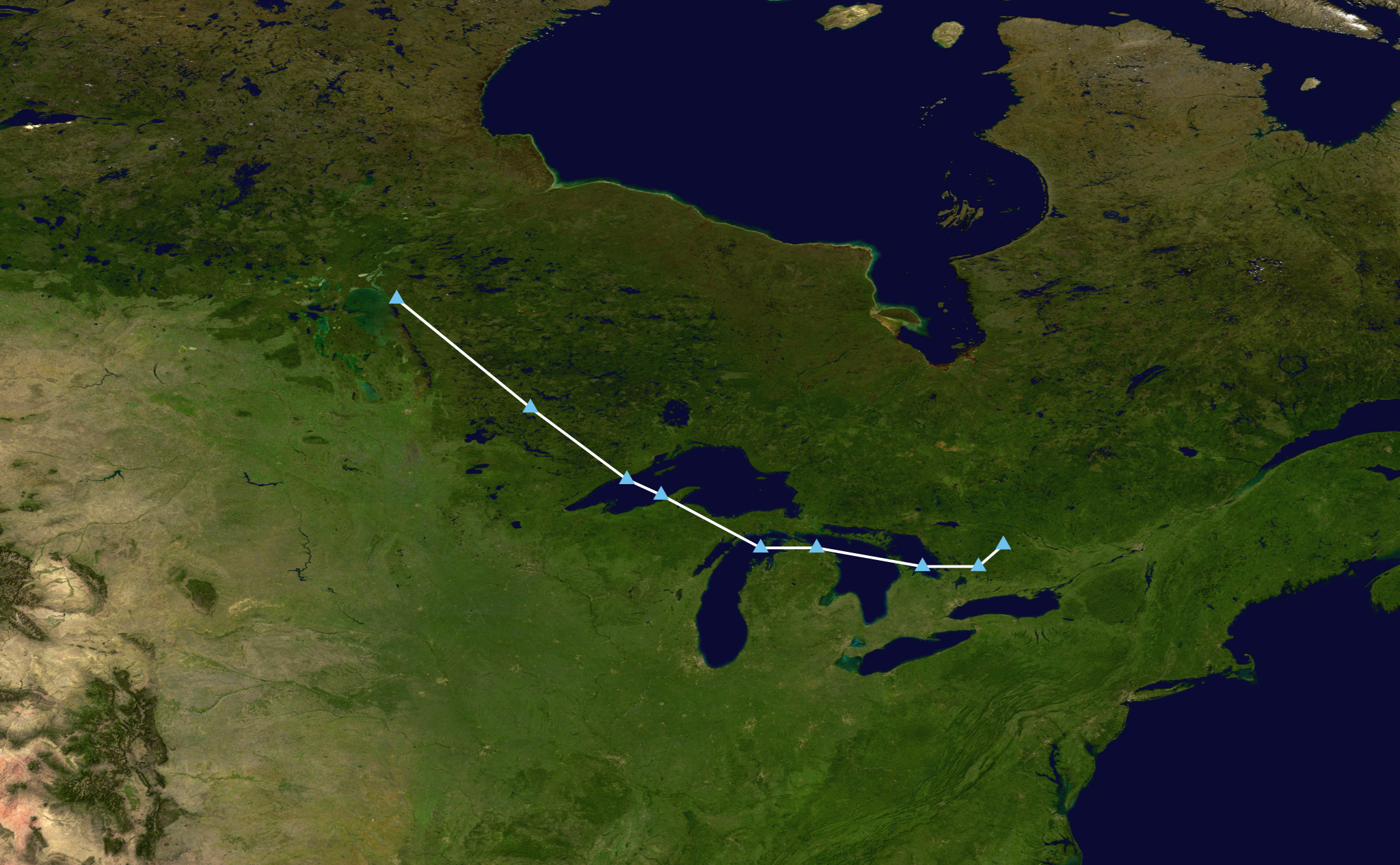
- Duration: November 16 – November 20, 2022
- Maximum snow: 81.2 in (206 cm)
- Fatalities: 4 fatalities

An intense lake-effect snow storm produced massive snow accumulations in the Buffalo metropolitan area. In preparation for the storm, the NFL game between the Buffalo Bills and Cleveland Browns game was moved to Detroit. In addition, New York Governor Kathy Hochul declared a state of emergency for 11 counties in Upstate New York. On the New York Thruway west of Exit 46, the road closed on the afternoon of November 17. Multiple Amtrak stations such as Buffalo, Niagara Falls and Depew closed, and Erie County suspended all bus service. Hamburg recorded 34 inches (86 cm) of snow by 8am on November 18. By 2:30pm, that amount increased to 37 inches (94 cm), with 42.3 inches (107 cm) in Orchard Park. In Buffalo, from 8-9pm 3.1 inches (7.9 cm) fell. Reed Timmer measured 50 inches (130 cm) of snow at 9:30pm in Hamburg. Over 6,000 customers lost power. The same lake effect storm also hammered parts of Ohio with up to 17.2 inches (44 cm) of snow in 12 hours. By the morning of November 19, Hamilton Park reported 70.9 inches (180 cm) of snow. Orchard Park reached 80 inches (200 cm) of snow, and 66 inches (170 cm) of snow in 24 hours, which broke the record for the area. Buffalo International Airport reported 36.6 inches (93 cm) by the end of the storm. Hamburg, New York eventually reported 81.2 inches (206 cm) of snow, being the highest total from the storm. Heavy lake-effect snow also occurred in Watertown where 61 inches (150 cm) of snow was reported. Snow was amplified partially due to very warm Lake Erie temperatures of 52 °F (11 °C).

=== Mid-December blizzard ===
- Category 4 "Crippling" (RSI/NOAA: 15.83)
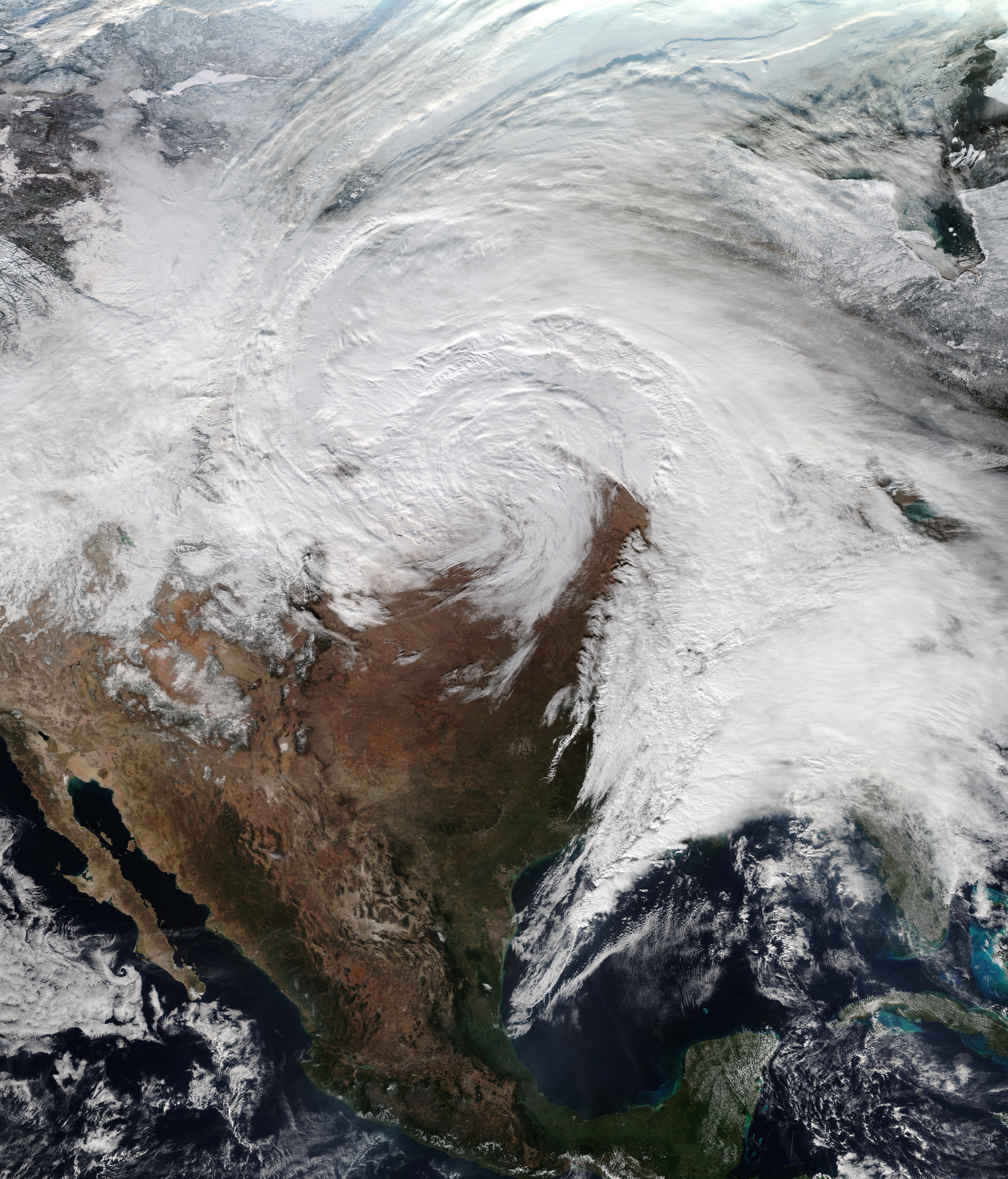
- Duration: December 12 – December 15, 2022
- Maximum snow: 48 in (120 cm)
- Damage: > $164.19 million (2022 USD)

A major blizzard occurred in the Great Plains related to a tornado outbreak, leading to heavy snow and freezing rain. In Fargo, North Dakota, all after school activities on December 13 were canceled. Parts of Interstate 80 in Nebraska and Interstate 76 in Colorado were shut down due to the blizzard, as was part of Interstate 90 in South Dakota. Portions of Interstate 29 were also shut down as the storm approached. Freezing rain accumulation peaked at 0.40 in (1.0 cm) in Litchville, North Dakota. Further east, blizzard conditions and thundersnow were verified in Duluth, Minnesota. Power outages totaled 45,000 in Minnesota, 70,000 in Wisconsin and 43,700 in Michigan. In Penn State University, the snowstorm forced the final exams to be rescheduled from December 15 to December 16 and 17. Small portions of Interstate 80 in Pennsylvania closed due to the storm. As of the morning of December 16, snow accumulations reached 11.4 in (29 cm) in Wilmington, Vermont. In New Hampshire, many regions received over 20 inches by the storm's end. Ultimately, over 160,000 customers in the Northeast lost power, including over 100,000 in New Hampshire alone.

=== Pre-Christmas blizzard and cold snap ===
- Category 4 "Crippling" (RSI/NOAA: 11.499)
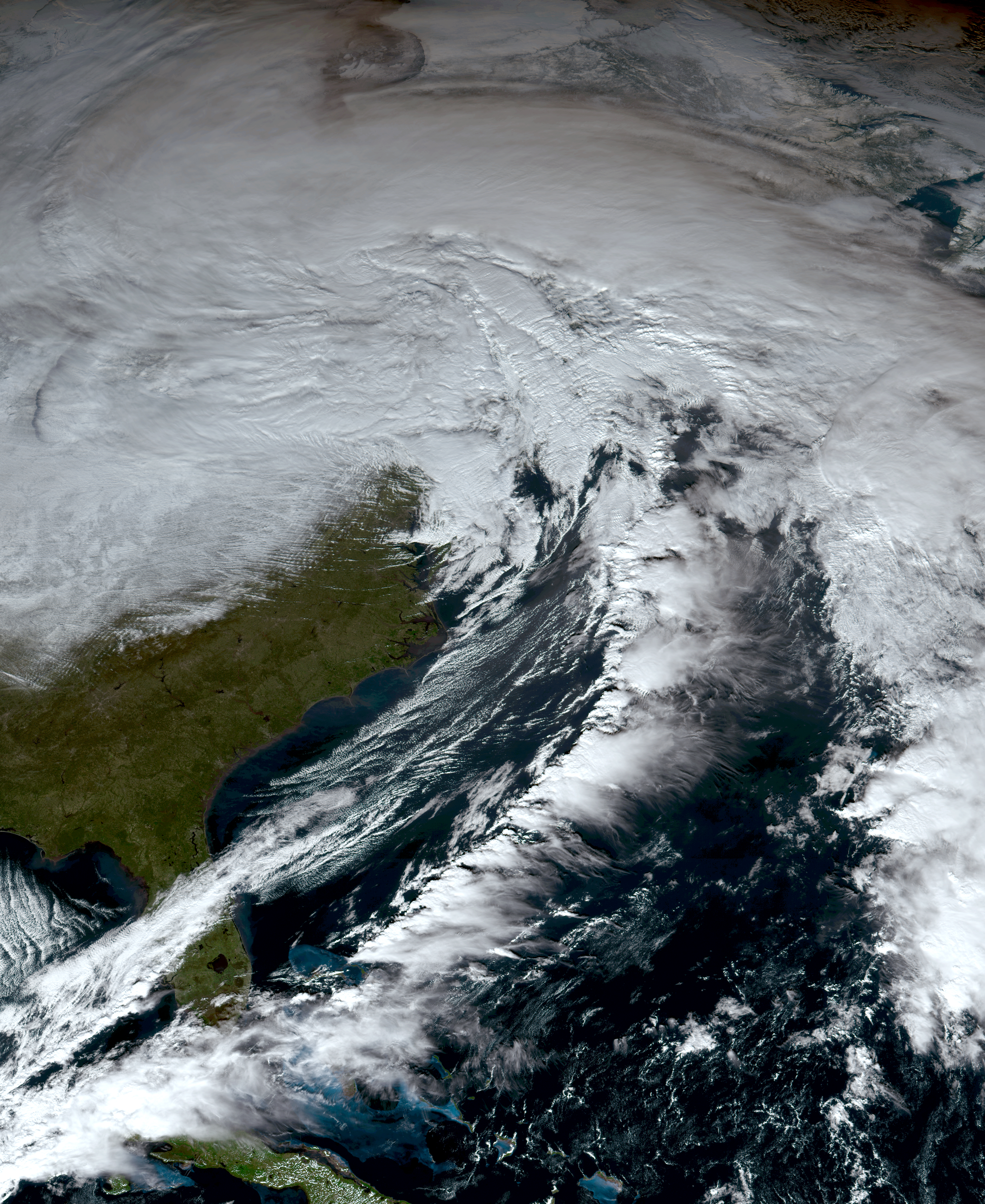
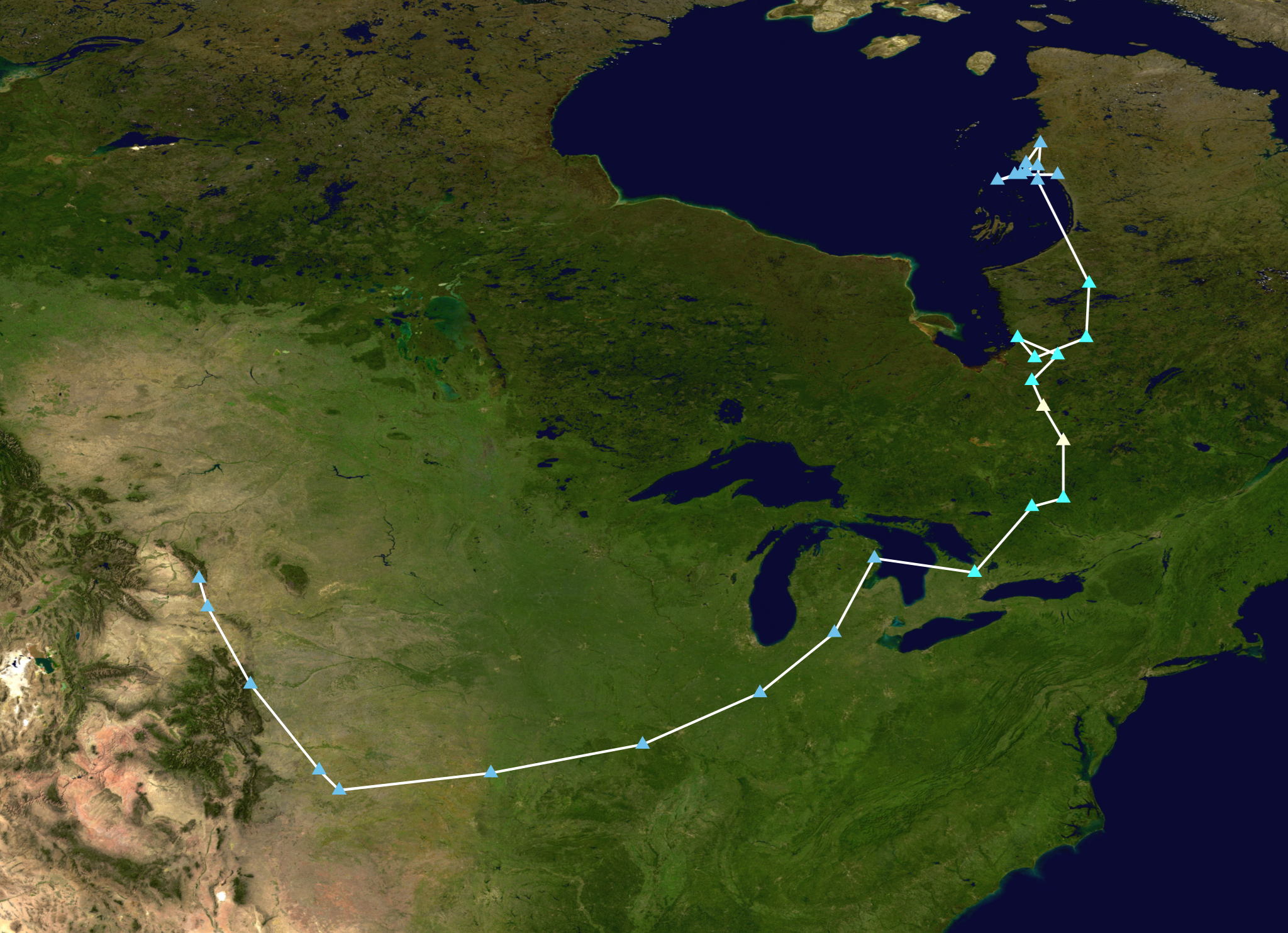
- Duration: December 21 – December 26, 2022
- Lowest pressure: 963 mb (28.44 inHg)
- Maximum snow: 56.5 in (144 cm)
- Fatalities: 106 (Note: Across 20 US states and two Canadian provinces) fatalities
- Damage: $8.5 billion (2022 USD)

Just prior to the Christmas holiday, another powerful and significant blizzard, unofficially named Winter Storm Elliott by The Weather Channel, began developing in southern Canada along an arctic front. It additionally dropped significant snowfall and record-breaking cold to the northern parts of the United States. Denver saw 3.9 in (9.9 cm) of snow, as temperatures fell to −20 °F (−29 °C), the coldest temperature in the city since exactly 32 years ago, and just one degree shy of tying the monthly record low. Parts of the state saw over a foot of snow. Denver saw their largest hourly temperature drop on December 21 from 4-5pm, as temperatures fell from 42 °F (6 °C) to 5 °F (−15 °C). Cheyenne, Wyoming broke their hourly temperature drop record in just 30 minutes, as temperatures fell from 43 °F (6 °C) to 3 °F (−16 °C) from 1:05pm to 1:35pm. In Casper, the low of −42 °F (−41 °C) set an all-time record. In Malta, Montana, the wind chill got as low as −72 °F (−58 °C). Eight thousand customers in Wichita, Kansas lost power, and portions of Interstate 435 closed due to snow. Overnight in Kansas City temperatures dropped from 32 °F (0 °C) to −2 °F (−19 °C) in just six hours. The highest snowfall totals in Iowa reached 5.9 inches (15 cm). In Nashville the low of −1 °F (−18 °C) was the coldest low temperature in the city since 1996. The winter storm led to 104 deaths, with 41 occurring in the Buffalo metropolitan area alone.

=== December–March California atmospheric rivers ===
- Category 0 "Nuisance" (RSI/NOAA: N/A)
- Duration: December 31, 2022 – March 25, 2023
- Fatalities: 22 fatalities

A series of atmospheric rivers starting on December 31 and extending into 2023 caused widespread heavy rainfall and snowfall in Northern California and Nevada, leading to flooding. At least 22 people were killed, although it is unknown how many fatalities were due to winter weather. President Joe Biden declared a state of emergency in California due to the winter storms.

=== Late January–early February ice storm ===
- Category 0 "Nuisance" (RSI/NOAA: N/A)
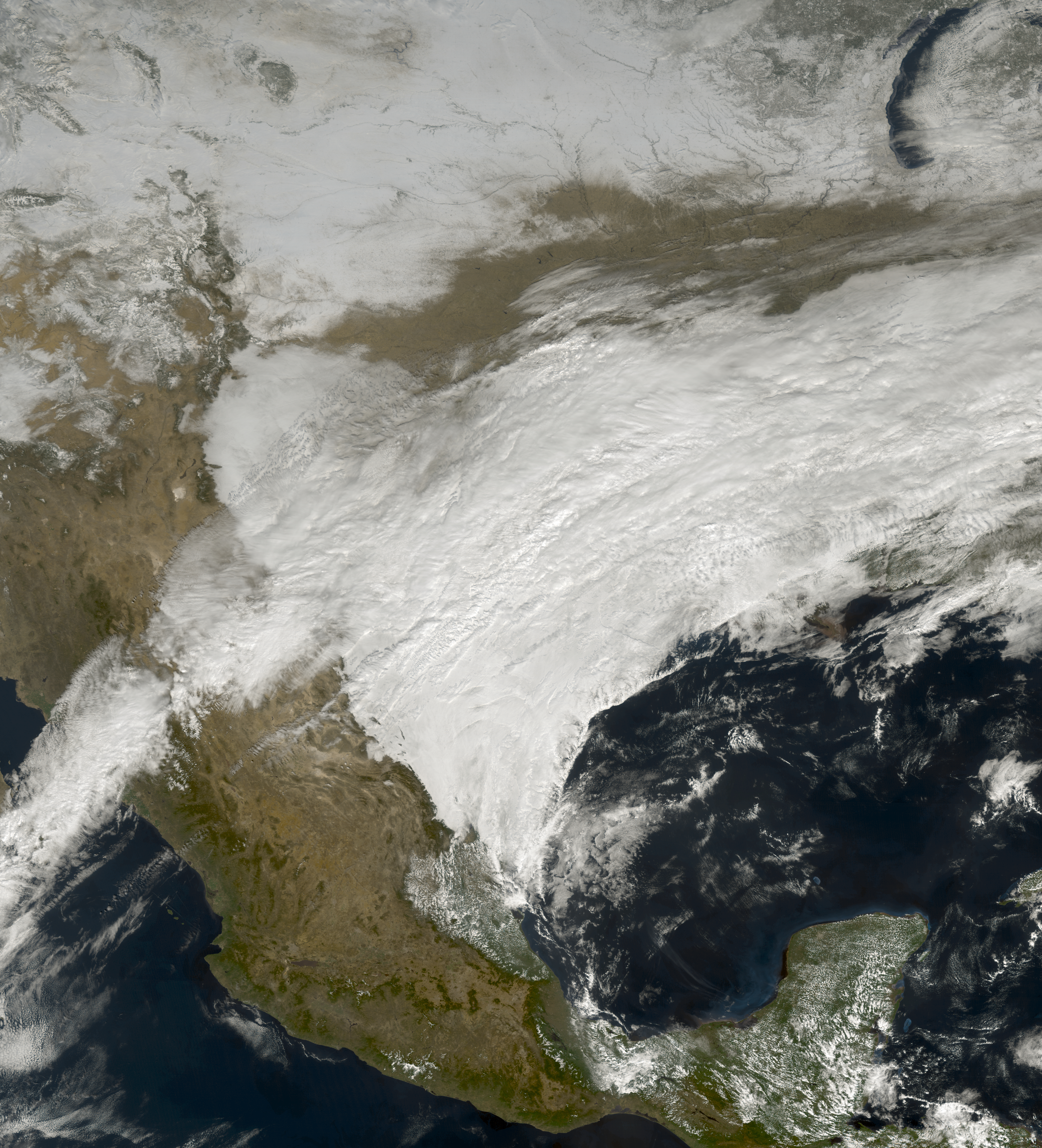
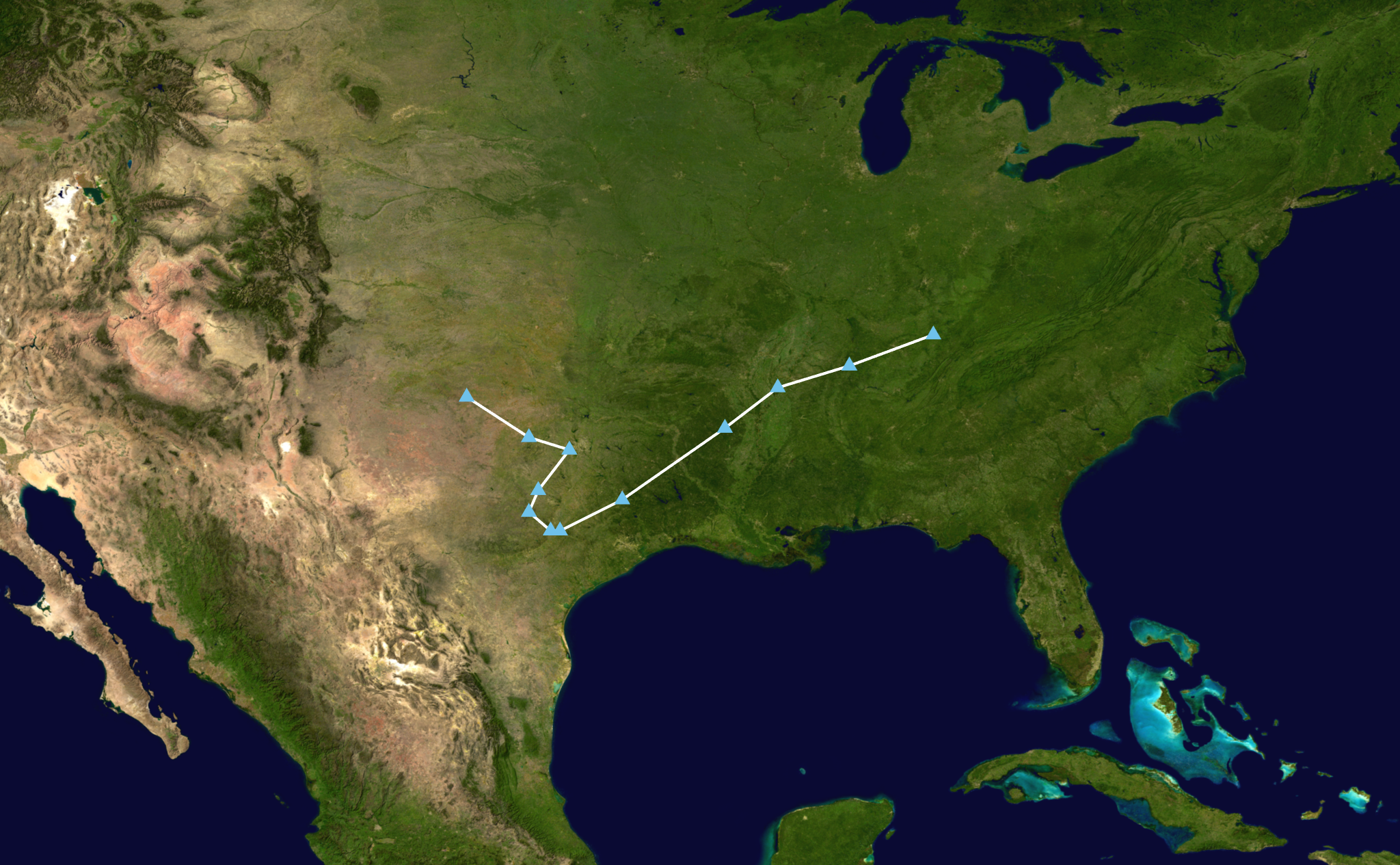
- Duration: January 31 – February 2, 2023
- Lowest pressure: 1016 mb (30.00 inHg)
- Fatalities: 10 fatalities
- Damage: $85.919 million (2023 USD)

An ice storm impacted the southern portion of the Great Plains at the end of January. As a result of the ice, several interstates in Texas, including interstates 10, 30, 35W, and 40, shut down after multiple car accidents occurred. The Weather Channel reported ten fatalities due to car accidents caused by the ice storm, however the National Centers for Environmental Information reported no fatalities. A total of 0.75 inches (1.9 cm) of ice accumulated in Fischer, Texas, and Dallas set a daily snowfall record on January 31, at 1.3 inches (3.3 cm). Additionally, more than 1,600 flights were cancelled, including over a thousand flights were cancelled at Dallas Fort Worth International Airport, and over 563,000 customers were left without power. On February 4, Texas governor Greg Abbott signed an emergency declaration for seven counties.

=== Early February cold wave ===
Following an arctic front moving in the night of February 2, extremely cold temperatures settled into the Northeast on February 3 and 4. Schools in Boston, Massachusetts closed on February 3 in anticipation of the cold temperatures. On February 4, 2023, Boston experienced a temperature of −10 °F (−23 °C), the first double-digit negative temperature in the city since the 1950s. Nantucket, Massachusetts was −3 °F (−19 °C), which tied a record low also set in both 2004 and 1962. Portland, Maine had a record low wind chill of −45 °F (−43 °C). Atop Mount Washington in New Hampshire, the wind chill hit −108 °F (−78 °C), the coldest wind chill in the United States, with an air temperature of −47 °F (−44 °C) combined with wind speeds of 97 mph (156 km/h). The cold wave caused 5,000 power outages in Connecticut. The temperature in Bridgeport, Connecticut of −4 °F (−20 °C) broke the previous record by 9 °F (5 °C). Temperatures in Burlington, Vermont were −15 °F (−26 °C) on February 4, leading to steam devils on Lake Champlain. Several frostquakes occurred in Maine. An all-time record low temperature was set atop Whiteface Mountain, at −40.2 °F (−40.1 °C). Strong winds relating to the arctic front killed a passenger in a car in western Massachusetts when a tree fell on the car. 60,000 customers lost power due to the cold wave in New England, with 46,000 in Massachusetts alone. 191 flights were delayed and 62 flights were cancelled out of Logan International Airport due to the bitter cold.

In preparation for the cold snap, a wind chill advisory was issued for eastern Suffolk County. In New York City, the low at Central Park on February 4 was 3 °F (−16 °C), marking the coldest temperature there since 2019, although shy of the previous record low for the date. However, LaGuardia Airport's low of 5 °F (−15 °C) and John F. Kennedy International Airport’s low of 4 °F (−16 °C) were low enough to set daily records. Newark, New Jersey also recorded a record low of 5 °F (−15 °C), although it was the only site in the state to break a daily record. Temperatures in the state got as low as −10 °F (−23 °C) at High Point Monument in Sussex County, New Jersey.

The National Centers for Environmental Information documented that this winter storm and cold wave caused $1.6 billion (2023 USD) in damage.

=== Late February–early March storm complexes ===
==== First storm (February 21–28) ====
- Category 2 "Significant" (RSI/NOAA: 4.604)
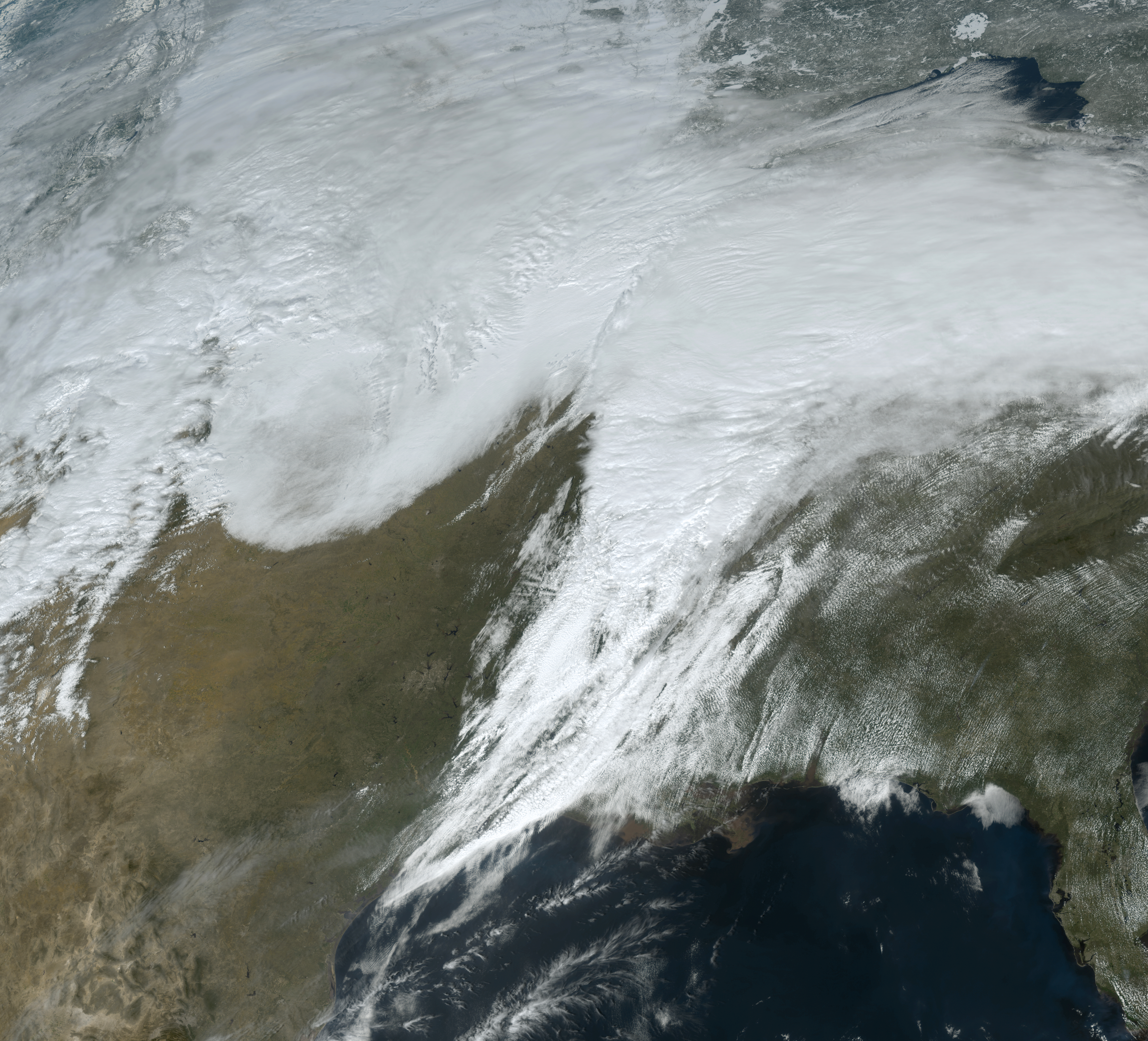
- Duration: February 21 – February 28, 2023
- Lowest pressure: 984 mb (29.06 inHg)
- Fatalities: 13 fatalities

A winter storm, unofficially named Winter Storm Olive by The Weather Channel, was impacting the Midwestern United States from February 21–24. Beginning February 21, several inches of snow to a foot fell across parts of Wisconsin and Iowa, with the highest accumulations occurring north of the Interstate 90 corridor. Freezing rain and sleet disrupted travel around the region, with ice accumulations reaching 1/4 of an inch. 11 in (28 cm) of snow fell in Minneapolis, while Faribault recorded 12 in (30 cm) of snow. Hundreds of car crashes were reported, including 4 jackknifed semi-trucks. Wind gusts of over 40 mph (64 km/h) impacted the Twin cities.

There were 13 fatalities, including a firefighter in Michigan, at least 1,200,000 power outages, and at least 3,000 flights cancelled by the storm.

==== Second storm (March 1–4) ====
- Category 0 "Nuisance" (RSI/NOAA: N/A)
- Duration: March 1 – March 4, 2023
- Maximum snow: 31 in (79 cm)

On March 1, a snowstorm in Arizona led to many pileups, and several roads such as I-40, I-17, and US 93 closed. In addition, I-80 closed from Applegate, California to the Nevada state line. In Nevada, portions of US 93, I-11 and I-15 were shut down as well, as well as several state highways. Joshua Tree National Park temporarily closed due to the inclement weather, and the San Bernardino National Forest shut down for two weeks. Numerous other national parks had partial closures. A supermarket in Crestline, California collapsed due to the snow. One person was killed due to the storm in California. On March 3, snow led to many snow emergencies in the Albany, New York metropolitan area and near Pittsfield, Massachusetts. Ultimately, 7.8 in (20 cm) of snow fell in Albany. 72,700 customers in eastern New York lost power due to the winter storm. On the night of March 3, WestJet cancelled all flights out of Toronto Pearson Airport due to the snow. The snowstorm also shut down Detroit Metro Airport on the night of March 3. The Maine Turnpike had a speed restriction as a result of the storm.

=== Mid-March nor’easter ===
- Category 2 "Significant" (RSI/NOAA: 3.635)
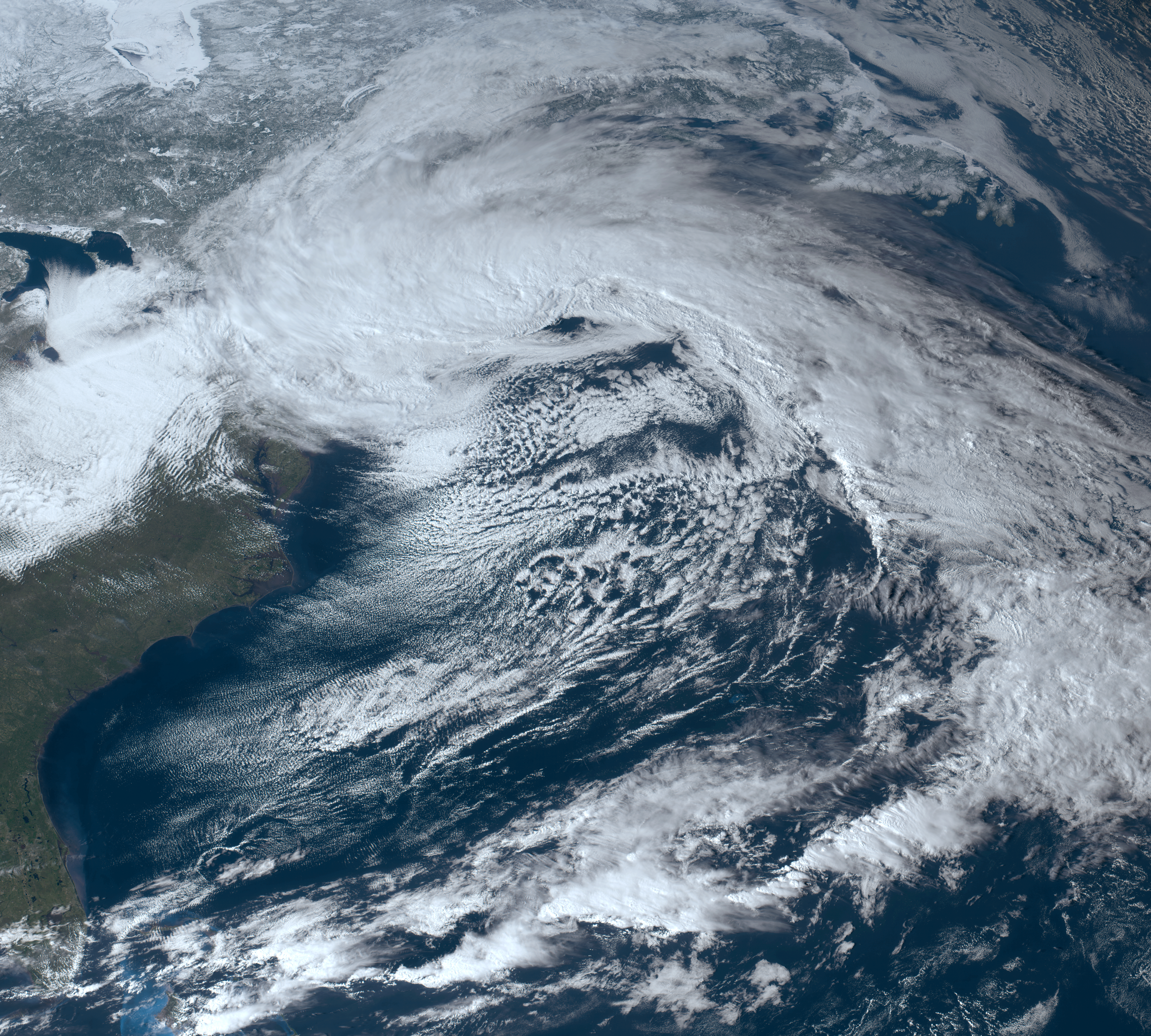
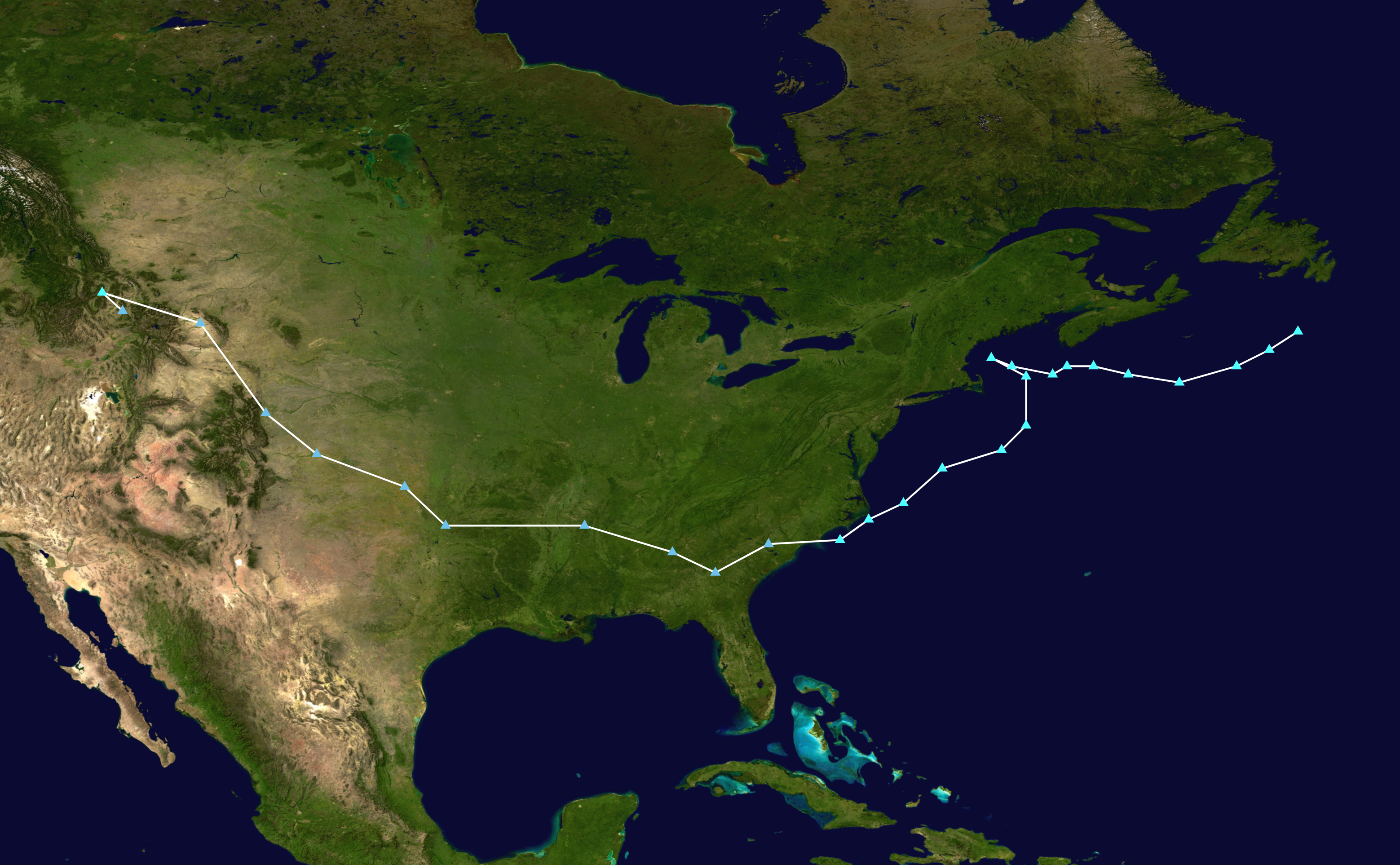
- Duration: March 12 – March 15, 2023
- Lowest pressure: 980 mb (28.94 inHg)
- Fatalities: 3 fatalities
- Damage: $215 million (2023 USD)

Before the storm, Jon Palmer of the National Weather Service office in Gray, Maine stated that the precipitation might cause significant power disruptions that last for over 48 hours, and Kathy Hochul, governor of New York, declared a state of emergency. Cornell University shut down on March 14 in preparation for the snow, and in Connecticut governor Ned Lamont banned all tractor trailers on Interstate 84 at 6am on March 14 in preparation for the storm. During the storm, over 250,000 customers lost power, and low visibility lead to over 200 car crashes in New England, as well as a temporary shutdown of Interstate 93. Snow and ice also resulted in the Piscataqua River Bridge being shut down for around an hour. 20–40 in (51–102 cm) of snow fell in Southern Vermont, the Adirondacks, and the Monadnock Region of Southwestern New Hampshire. Larger population centers along the New England coastline were mostly spared from the heaviest snow amounts, but minor wind damage and coastal flooding was still reported in and around Boston. A plane skidded off the runway at Syracuse Hancock Airport. Farther south, the nor’easter forced a ground stop at LaGuardia Airport. Up to 4.12 in (105 mm) of rain fell in Higganum, Connecticut but very little snow fell close to the coast, with Central Park only receiving a trace of snow, LaGuardia and Kennedy Airport receiving just 0.1 in (0.25 cm) of snow, and Newark, New Jersey recording 0.4 in (1.0 cm) of snow, with up to 2.2 in (5.6 cm) of snow in parts of Long Island.

=== Early April blizzard & Canada ice storm ===
- Category 0 "Nuisance" (RSI/NOAA: N/A)
- Duration: April 3 – April 5, 2023
- Maximum snow: 48.8 in (124 cm)
- Fatalities: 8 fatalities

A major blizzard struck the Great Plains in early April 2023. In preparation for the storm, blizzard warnings were issued for over 800 mi (1,300 km), from Wyoming to Minnesota. The snowstorm in Casper, Wyoming resulted in them setting both a one-day and two day record for snowfall, at 26.7 in (68 cm) and 37.4 in (95 cm). Atlantic City, Wyoming recorded 48.8 in (124 cm). Kenora, Ontario recorded 27.2 cm (10.7 in) of snow. As a result of the storm, parts of Interstate 29, Interstate 90 and Interstate 94 was closed due to the storm, and both Fargo and Grand Forks, North Dakota had record deep snowpack for so late in the spring. Two people were killed in the winter storm due to a car crash on icy roads in Ward County, North Dakota. Blowing snow in southern Manitoba resulted in several highways shutting down as well. Mount Rushmore and Badlands National Park closed due to the snow. In addition, Salt Lake City set a record cold high after the storm, at only 33 °F (1 °C). As a result of the snow, as well as forecasted high temperatures of 34 °F (1 °C), the Minnesota Twins postponed their home opener by a day. Further east, a severe ice storm struck Quebec, resulting in a fatality in Montreal and over a million customers losing power. In addition to winter weather impacts, the system also spawned a severe weather and tornado outbreak that affected the Midwestern United States, Mississippi Valley, and Great Lakes. A total of 27 tornadoes were confirmed along with five fatalities.

=== Early May winter storm ===
- Category 0 "Nuisance" (RSI/NOAA: N/A)
- Duration: May 1 – May 3, 2023
- Maximum snow: 26.2 in (67 cm)
- Damage: $2.1 million (2023 USD)

A record breaking winter storm affected the Upper Peninsula of Michigan from May 1 to 2. The city of Marquette, Michigan received 26.2 in (67 cm) of snow, which made the city record their snowiest May on record. 19.8 in (50 cm) of that total fell on May 1, which became the snowiest day in May for the city. Over ten thousand customers in the Upper Peninsula lost power, and property damage reached $2.1 million. Further south, Green Bay, Wisconsin recorded 2.2 in (5.6 cm) of snow. West Virginia set a monthly snowfall record with Davis receiving 20.3 in (52 cm) of snow. Further north, Pittsburgh had a record cold high on May 2 due to the system, at 44 °F (7 °C).

== Records ==
=== Eastern United States ===
Due to unfavorable storm tracks, the Eastern United States received little snowfall. For the first time in history, Charlotte, North Carolina did not even record a trace of snow. New York City also recorded its least snowy winter with just 2.3 in (5.8 cm) of snow, as well as their second warmest winter and warmest January on record. The record warm January contributed to the first snowfall occurring on February 1, the latest first date for snowfall on record. The season also became the least snowy on record at Baltimore, Atlantic City, Bridgeport, Oswego and Elkins, as well as tying for the second least snowy at Philadelphia, becoming the third least snowy in Washington DC and fourth least snowy in Boston. In addition to the lack of snow, it was also one of the warmest winters on record, with Massachusetts tying for their warmest winter at an average temperature of 33.7 °F (0.9 °C), with Tupelo, Mississippi also recording their warmest winter. Pittsburgh recorded their least snowy February at only 0.2 in (0.51 cm) of snow, with seasonal snowfall being well below normal. Despite that, Buffalo, New York recorded its fifth snowiest winter on record with 132.8 in (337 cm) of snow falling, mainly due to lake effect snowstorms in November and December 2022. In addition, Mount Washington recorded their snowiest June on record.

=== Midwestern United States ===
The city of Duluth, Minnesota experienced their snowiest winter, with 138.3 in (351 cm) of snow as of April 20, while Minneapolis recorded their third snowiest winter. The city of Sioux Falls, South Dakota had their second snowiest January in history, as well as their snowiest 24 hour period between January 2-3, and their fourth wettest January. 2023 also became the wettest first quarter in LaCrosse, Wisconsin, Rochester, Minnesota and Saint Cloud, Minnesota, with the state of Wisconsin recording their third wettest start of the year.

=== Western United States ===
The same pattern that contributed to little snow in the east helped give major snow to the Western US. The city of Flagstaff, Arizona recorded their third snowiest January on record. The winter also became the second snowiest at the UC Berkeley Central Sierra Snow Lab, which also made it the second deepest snowpack in California history. This also helped produce copious amounts of rain in areas too warm for snow, with Hanford, California recording their wettest day on record on February 24, and San Francisco recorded their third wettest winter on record. In addition, the first quarter of 2023 became the coldest on record for Lander, Wyoming. Near-record snow at the North Rim of the Grand Canyon National Park resulted in the opening date being delayed to June 2.

== Season effects ==
This is a table of all of the events that have occurred in the 2022–23 North American winter. It includes their duration, damage, impacted locations, and death totals. Deaths in parentheses are additional and indirect (an example of an indirect death would be a traffic accident), but were still related to that storm. All of the damage figures are in 2023 USD.

Regional snowfall index scale
C0	C1	C2	C3	C4	C5

2022–23 North American winter season statistics
Event name	Dates active	RSI category	RSI value	Highest gust mph (km/h)	Minimum pressure (mbar)	Maximum snow in (cm)	Maximum ice in (mm)	Areas affected	Damage (2023 USD)	Deaths
Early November blizzard	November 9–11	N/A	N/A	Unknown	1002	24 (61)	0.5–1 (1.3–2.5)	Midwestern United States	Unknown	0
Mid-November winter storm	November 16–20	N/A	N/A	Unknown	Unknown	81.2 (206)	Unknown	Midwestern United States Northeastern United States	Unknown	4
Mid-December blizzard	December 12–15	Category 4	15.83	Unknown	Unknown	48 (120)	Unknown	Western United States Midwestern United States Northeastern United States	>$164.19 million	3
Pre-Christmas blizzard	December 21–26	Category 4	11.499	151 (243)	963	56.5 (144)	Unknown	Western United States British Columbia Midwestern United States Northeastern United States Atlantic Canada	$8.5 billion	106
December–March California atmospheric rivers	December 31–January 25	N/A	N/A	Unknown	Unknown	Unknown	Unknown	Western United States	$4.6 billion	22
Late January–early February ice storm	January 31–February 2	N/A	N/A	Unknown	1016	1.3 (3.3)	0.75 (1.9)	Western United States Southern United States	$85.919 million	10
First storm (February 21–28)	February 21–28	Category 2	4.60	Unknown	984	12 (30)	0.25 (0.635)	Western United States Southern United States Midwestern United States	Unknown	13
Second storm (March 1–4)	March 1–4	N/A	N/A	95 (153)	Unknown	31 (79)	Unknown	Southern United States Northeastern United States	$5.8 billion	13
Mid-March nor’easter	March 12–15	Category 2	3.635	Unknown	980	42.1 (107)	Unknown	Western United States Midwestern United States Northeastern United States	$215 million	3
Early April blizzard	April 3–5	N/A	N/A	Unknown	Unknown	48.8 (124)	Unknown	Western United States Midwestern United States Ontario Quebec	Unknown	8
Early May winter storm	May 1–3	N/A	N/A	Unknown	Unknown	26.2 (67)	Unknown	Midwestern United States Southern United States	$2.1 million	0
Season aggregates
4 RSI storms	November 9 – May 3				963	81.2 (206)	0.5–1 (1.3–2.5)		≥ $19.36 billion	182

== See also ==
- List of major snow and ice events in the United States
- Winter storm
- 2022–23 European windstorm season
- Tornadoes of 2022
- Tornadoes of 2023
- Weather of 2022
- Weather of 2023

== Notes ==
Preceded by 2021-22	North American winters 2022–23	Succeeded by 2023–24
