= November 2022 Great Lakes winter storm =

Winter storm in November 2022

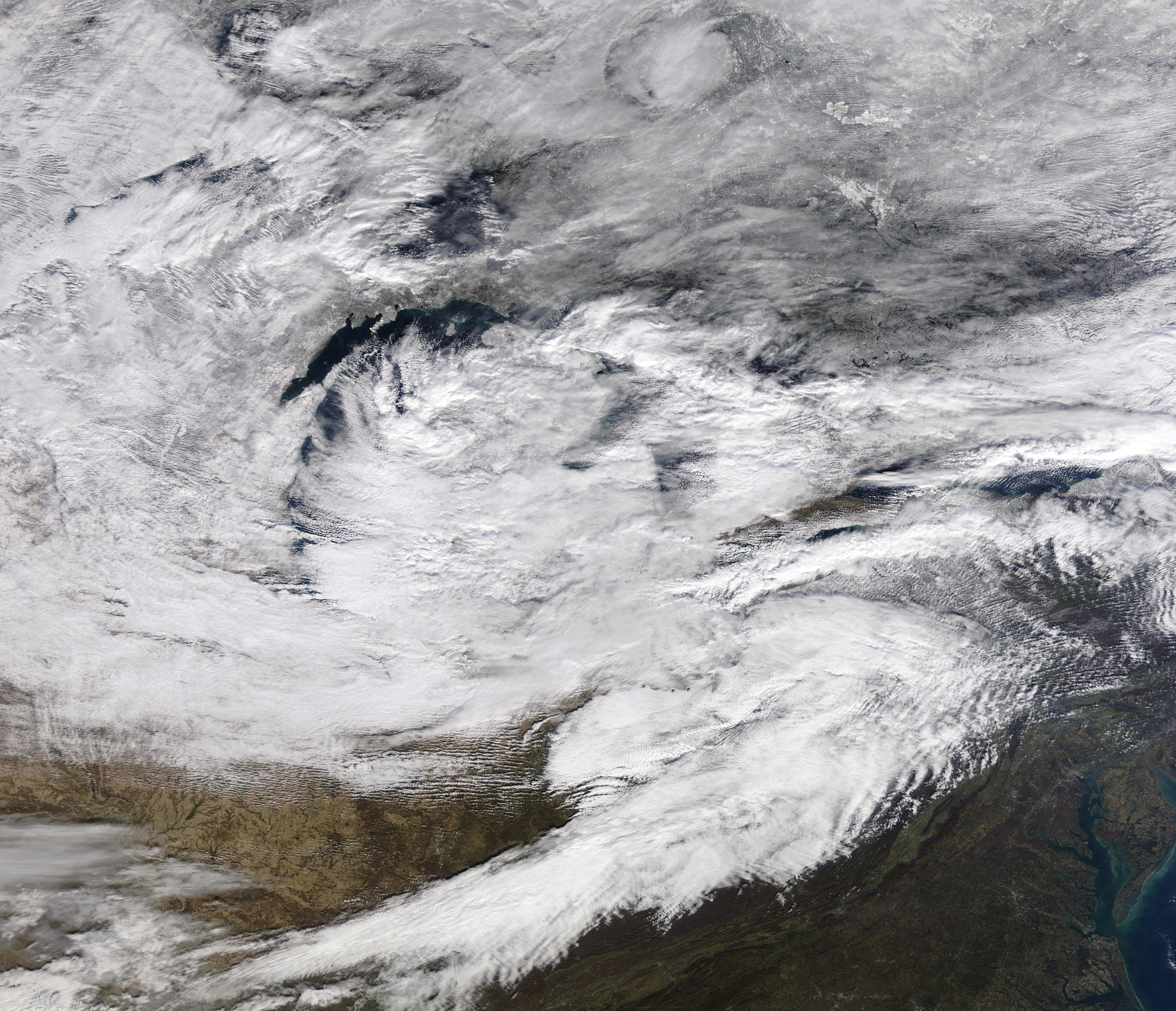
- Satellite image of the storm on November 18

Meteorological history
- Formed: November 17, 2022
- Dissipated: November 20, 2022

Meteorological information
- Max. snowfall: 81.2 in (206 cm) at Hamburg, New York

Overall effects
- Fatalities: 4
- Damage: >$30.5 million (2022 USD)
- Areas affected: Great Lakes region (especially the Buffalo-Niagara Falls metropolitan area)
- Power outages: 8,000
- Part of the 2022–23 North American winter

In November 2022, a severe lake-effect winter storm impacted parts of Pennsylvania, Ohio, and New York, causing high accumulations of snow across the Great Lakes region, including snowfall accumulations upwards of 50 in (130 cm) in several locations. In Hamburg, New York, 81.2 in (206 cm) fell, while Orchard Park, New York recorded 80 in (200 cm) of snow. At least four fatalities occurred, with three in New York and one in Indiana, and several highways closed after heavy snowfall. A travel ban was also issued for New York by governor Kathy Hochul, and thundersnow occurred across areas impacted by the winter storm.

== Meteorological history ==
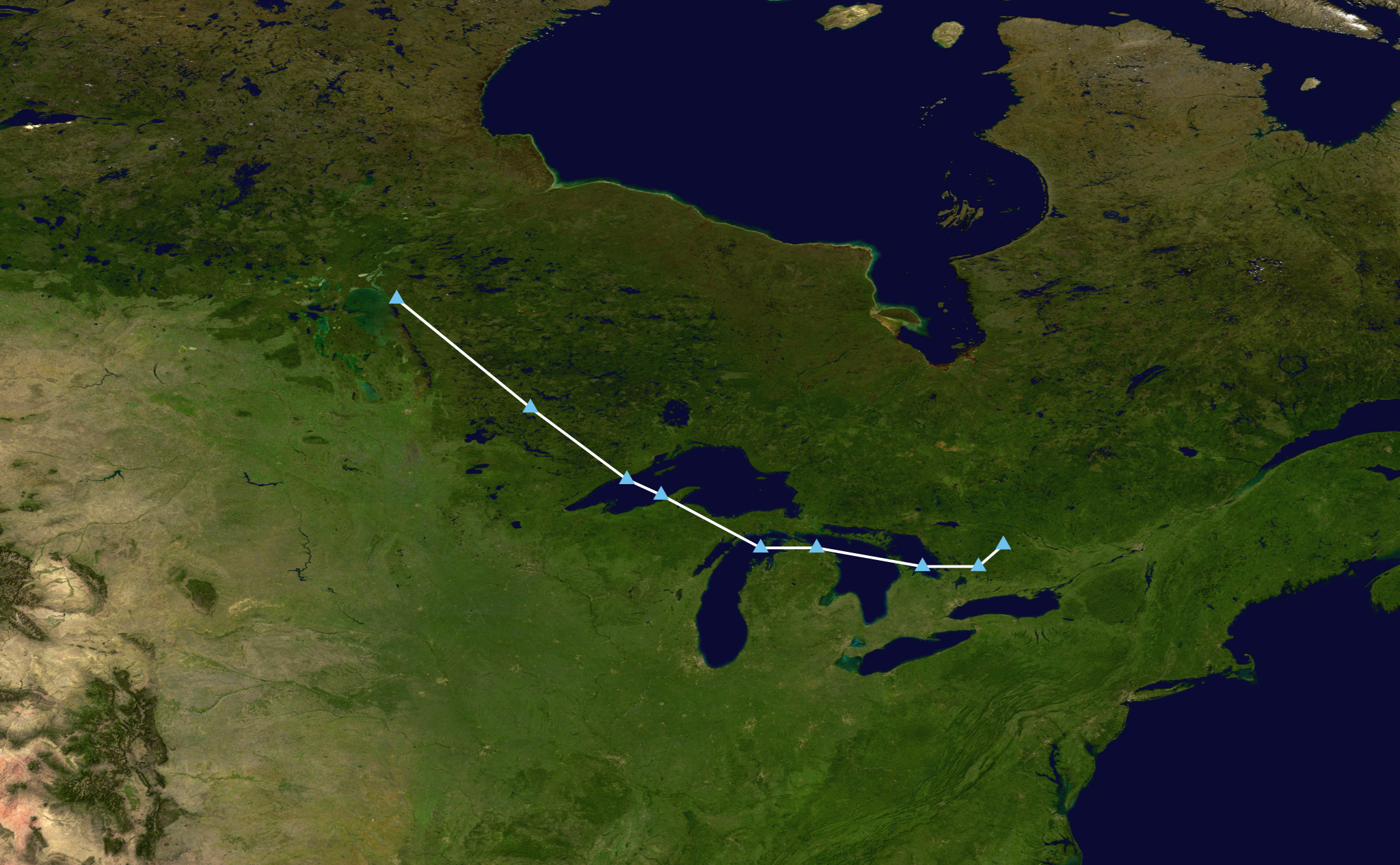
Map plotting the storm's track and intensity, according to the Saffir–Simpson scale Map key Saffir–Simpson scale Tropical depression (≤38 mph, ≤62 km/h) Tropical storm (39–73 mph, 63–118 km/h) Category 1 (74–95 mph, 119–153 km/h) Category 2 (96–110 mph, 154–177 km/h) Category 3 (111–129 mph, 178–208 km/h) Category 4 (130–156 mph, 209–251 km/h) Category 5 (≥157 mph, ≥252 km/h) Unknown Storm type Tropical cyclone Subtropical cyclone Extratropical cyclone, remnant low, tropical disturbance, or monsoon depression

The storm started on November 16, 2022, at around 18:00 UTC with snowfall being recorded just south of Buffalo, New York. Hamburg recorded 34 inches (86 cm) of snow by 8AM EST on November 18. By 2:30pm, that amount increased to 37 inches (94 cm), with 42.3 inches (107 cm) in Orchard Park. In Buffalo, from 8–9 PM, 3.1 inches (7.9 cm) fell. Over 6,000 customers lost power. The same lake effect storm also hammered parts of Ohio with up to 17.2 inches (44 cm) of snow in 12 hours. Snow was amplified partially due to very warm Lake Erie temperatures of 52 °F (11 °C).

=== Snow and ice totals ===
observed snow totals from high affected snow areas
State	Town	Amount
New York	Hamburg	81.2 inches (206 cm)
New York	Orchard Park	80 inches (200 cm)
New York	Natural Bridge	70.9 inches (180 cm)
New York	Blasdell	65 inches (170 cm)
New York	Watertown	57.4 inches (146 cm)

== Preparations ==
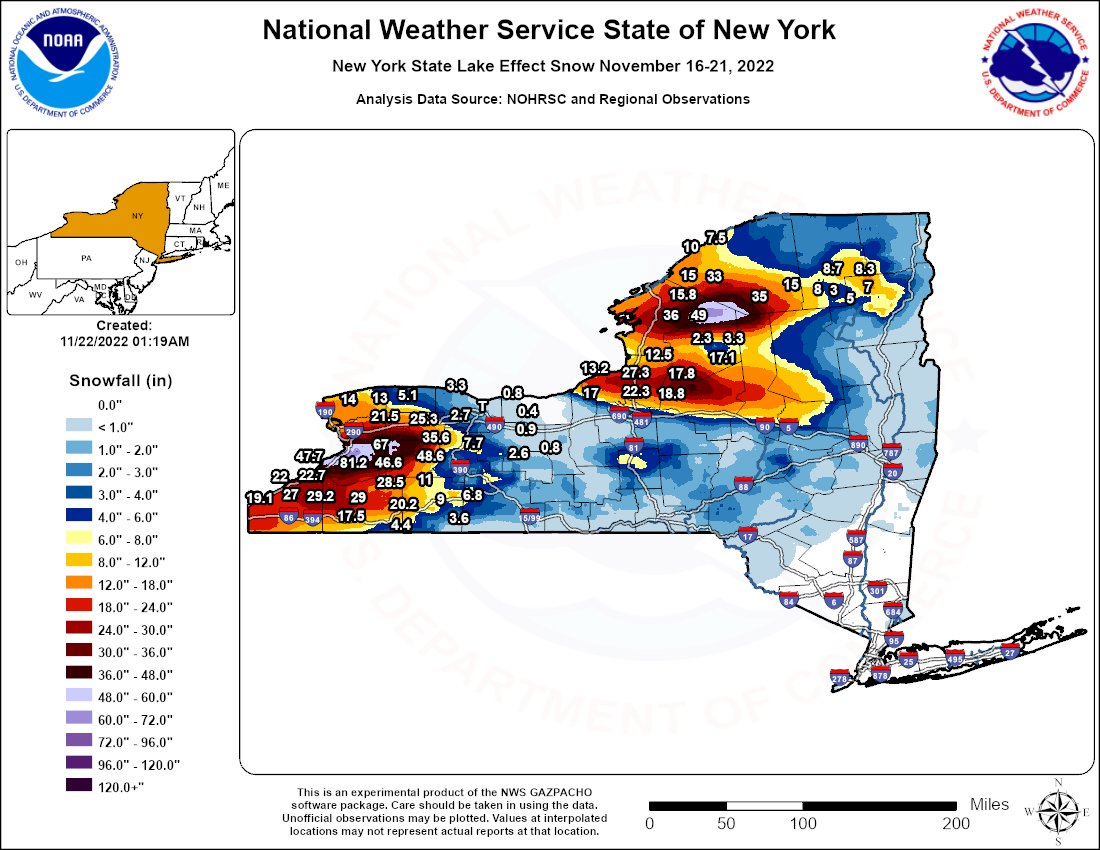
November 16–21, 2022 snowfall totals in New York

Winter weather advisories were in place for six states: Pennsylvania, New York, Ohio, Michigan, Indiana, and Wisconsin. New York Governor Kathy Hochul declared a state of emergency for 11 counties. The Buffalo Bills–Cleveland Browns game was moved to Detroit. Numerous flights were cancelled at the Buffalo Niagara International Airport. The Buffalo Skyway was closed temporarily, and the New York Thruway was closed west of Exit 46 on the afternoon of November 17. Multiple Amtrak stations shut down, including by Buffalo, Niagara Falls and Depew. Meanwhile Erie County suspended all bus service.

== Impact ==
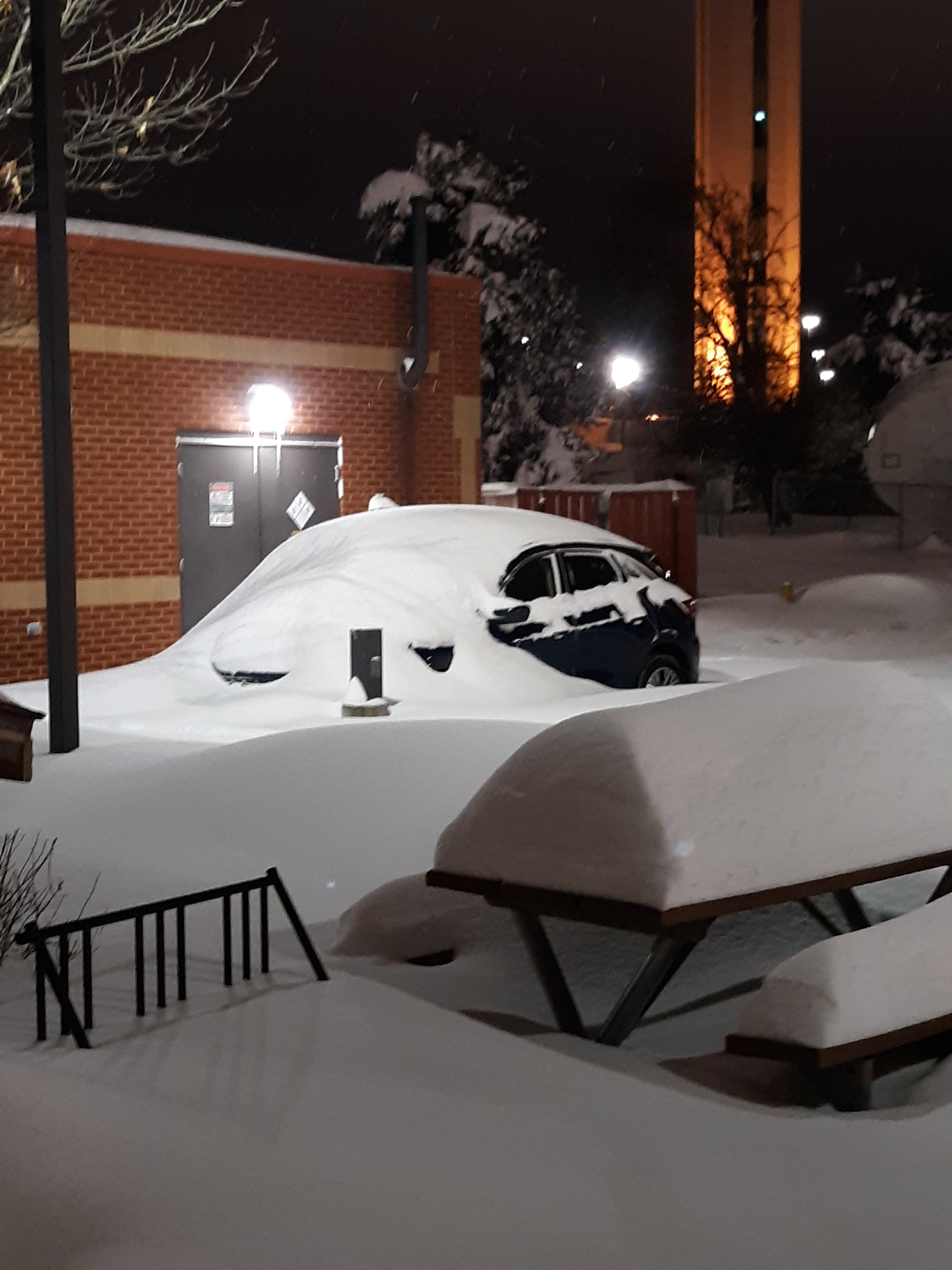
30.2 inches (77 cm) of snowfall at the National Weather Service Buffalo, New York on the morning of November 19, 2022

Natural Bridge, New York received 70.9 inches (180 cm) of snow. A 132 mi (212 km) stretch of the New York Thruway was closed from Rochester, New York to the Pennsylvania border. Interstate 90 in Pennsylvania was also closed east of the interchange with Interstate 86. The full length of Interstate 290 and Interstate 990 was closed as well. Further east, Interstate 81 was closed from the exit of NY-69 north to the Canada–United States border. A full commercial travel ban was issued for multiple highways in New York. Thundersnow was also recorded when the snowstorm hit, with several cars and trucks stuck in the snow. At 66 inches (170 cm) in a single day, Orchard Park set a record for most snow in a single day, with the total snowfall being 77 in (200 cm). In Gile, Wisconsin, ending on November 18, recorded 24.5 inches (62 cm) of snow. In addition, 23.3 inches (59 cm) fell in Grand Rapids, Michigan in 65 hours, including daily snowfall records on November 17 and 19. It has been made November at the Buffalo Niagara International Airport as the third-snowiest November, which later become second-snowiest. At least two deaths occurred, due to cardiac arrest after shoveling the snow. A third person died in Hamlet, Indiana after his snowplow rolled over. An estimated 8,000 customers were without power. The 36.9 inches (94 cm) of snow that fell in Buffalo, New York in a period of three days made November 2022 the second-highest accumulation of snow in November there.

== See also ==
- Weather of 2022
- 2022–23 North American winter
- November 13–21, 2014 North American winter storm
- Late December 2022 North American winter storm
