= January 31 – February 2, 2023 North American ice storm =

Winter storm in the Southern United States

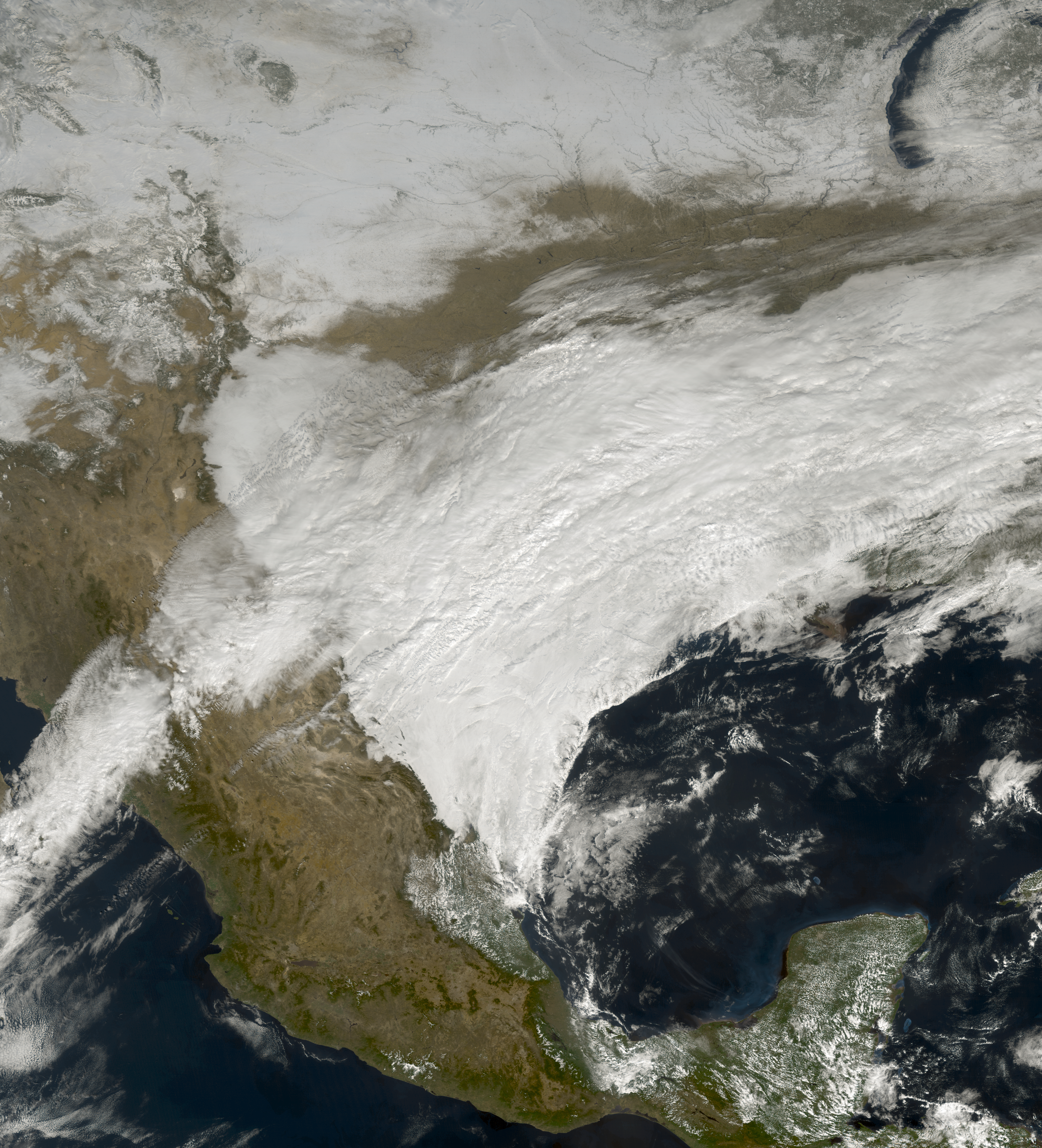
- GOES-16 satellite image of the storm impacting the South Central United States at 17:36 UTC (11:36 a.m. CST) on January 31

Meteorological history
- Formed: January 31, 2023
- Dissipated: February 2, 2023

Ice storm
- Lowest pressure: 1016 hPa (mbar); 30.00 inHg

Overall effects
- Fatalities: 10 (Per TWC)
- Damage: $85.919 million (2023 USD)
- Areas affected: West South Central states
- Power outages: 563,000
- Part of the 2022–23 North American winter

An ice storm impacted the Southern United States in early 2023, bringing heavy snow and ice across the region. The Weather Channel reported that at least 10 deaths were attributed to the winter storm, which was unofficially named Winter Storm Mara by them.

== History ==
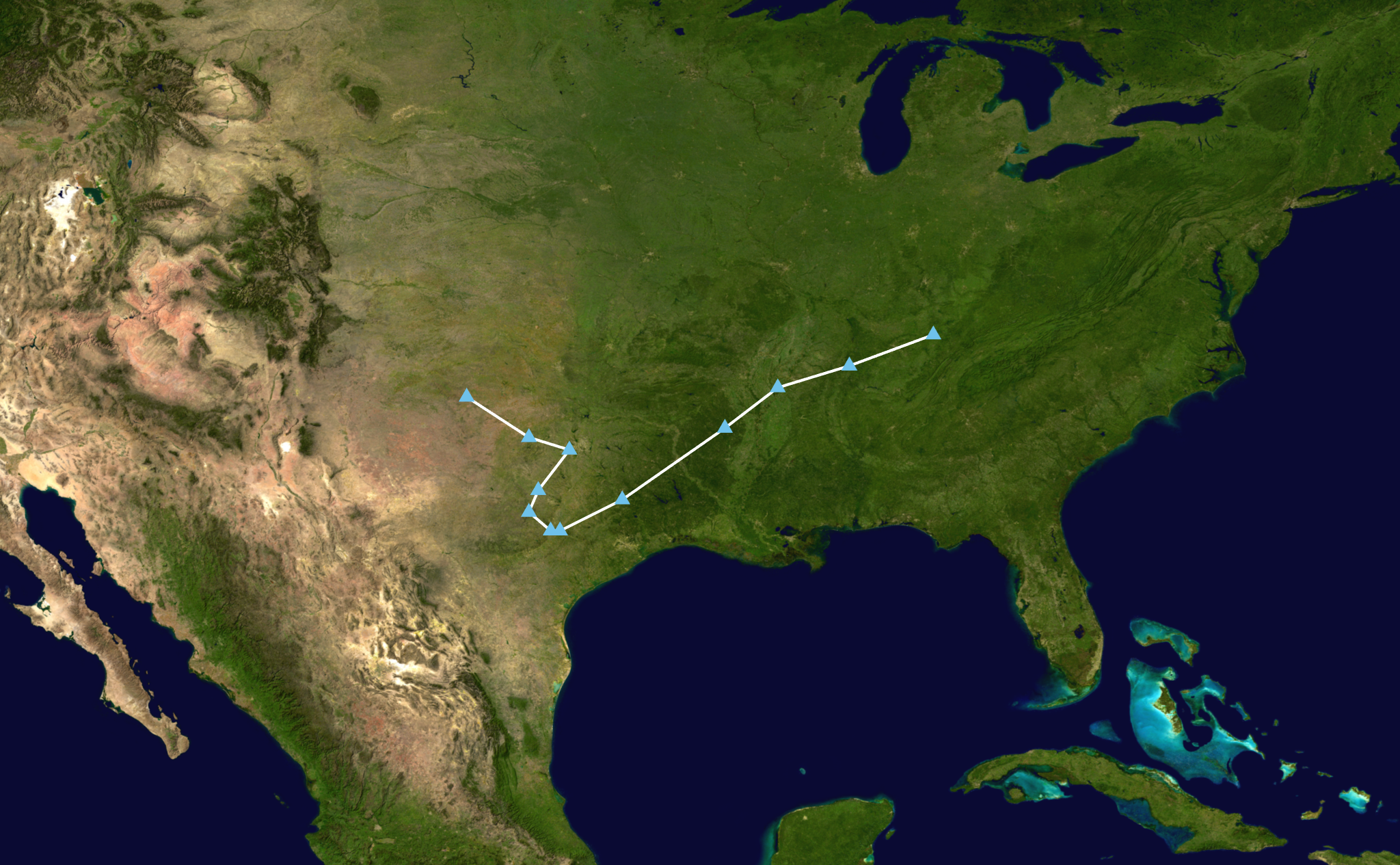
Map plotting the storm's track and intensity, according to the Saffir–Simpson scale Map key Saffir–Simpson scale Tropical depression (≤38 mph, ≤62 km/h) Tropical storm (39–73 mph, 63–118 km/h) Category 1 (74–95 mph, 119–153 km/h) Category 2 (96–110 mph, 154–177 km/h) Category 3 (111–129 mph, 178–208 km/h) Category 4 (130–156 mph, 209–251 km/h) Category 5 (≥157 mph, ≥252 km/h) Unknown Storm type Tropical cyclone Subtropical cyclone Extratropical cyclone, remnant low, tropical disturbance, or monsoon depression

The winter storm started when an Arctic cold passage made its way south into the Southern United States, where it met with warm and moist air from the Gulf of Mexico, creating the ice storm.

On January 31, an inch of sleet fell in the Tulsa, Oklahoma area, with the accompaniment of lightning at times. On the same day, freezing rain also fell in Arkansas, including the Fayetteville and Fort Smith areas, as well as Missouri, where cities such as Joplin and Springfield were impacted. Freezing rain and sleet fell as far south as Austin and San Antonio on January 31.

== Preparations ==
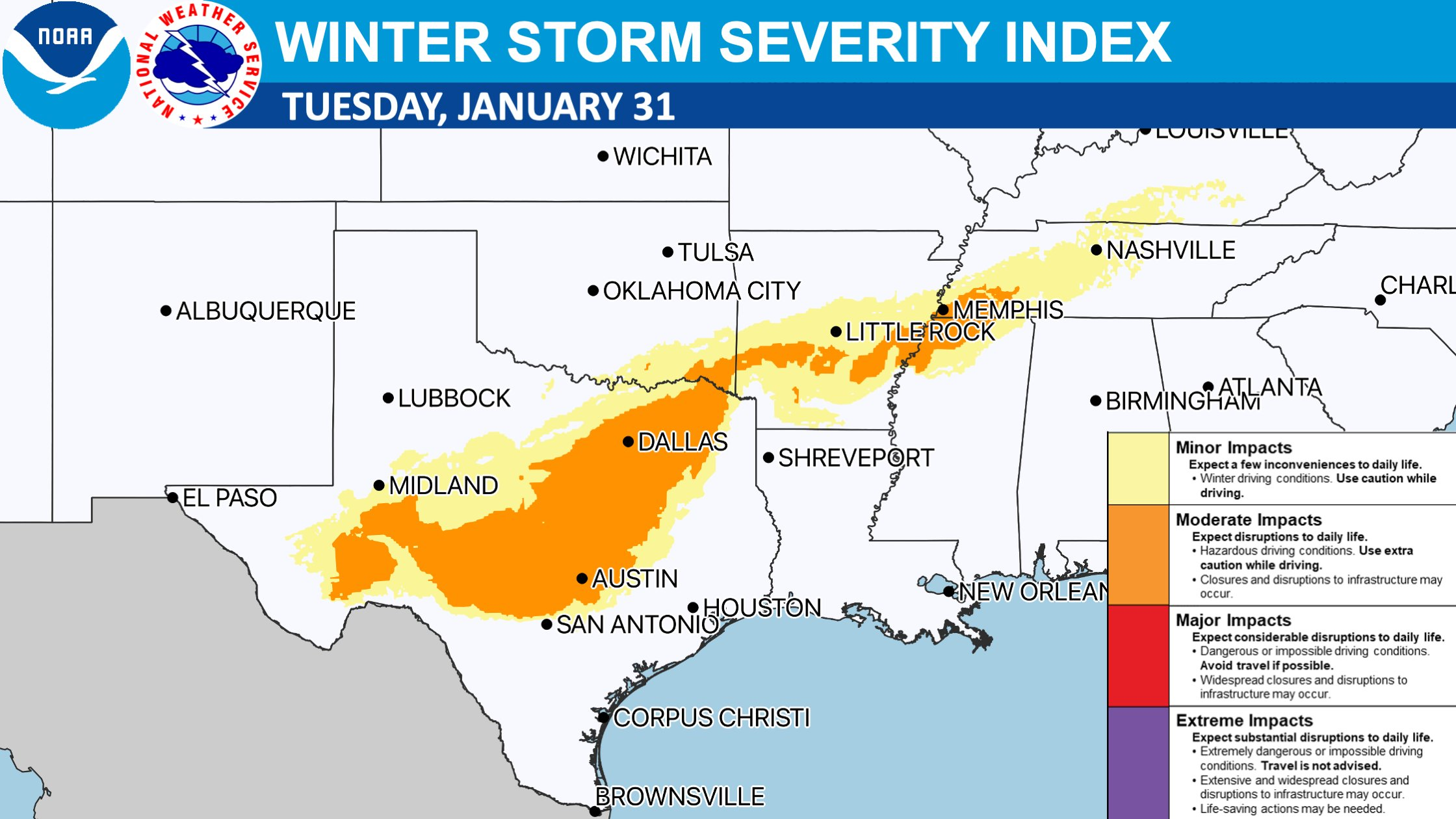
The National Weather Service's Winter Storm Severity Index for January 31, 2023

Arkansas Governor Sarah Huckabee Sanders stated that she activated winter weather support teams from the Arkansas National Guard. Multiple schools and universities, including Texas State University and St. Edward's University, announced virtual learning and closures. DoorDash suspended operations in central Arkansas on January 31, while USPS also suspended operations in north Texas on that same day. Other companies, including Amazon, FedEx, and UPS were operating under a limited capacity. 60 warming shelters were opened in Texas. The funeral for Tyre Nichols was postponed for four hours. An NBA game between the Detroit Pistons and the Washington Wizards was postponed. Approximately 60 million people from New Mexico to West Virginia were under a winter weather alert.

== Impact ==
Multiple media organizations reported ten deaths that were attributed to the winter storm, including seven in Texas, two in Oklahoma, and one in Arkansas. The National Centers for Environmental Information reported no deaths from this storm system. Numerous interstates, including interstates 10, 30, 35W, and 40 were shut down due to car accidents that were caused by the winter storm. Additionally, at least 100 car accidents were reported as a result. A total of 0.75 inches (1.9 cm) of ice accumulated in Fischer, Texas, while Kingsland, Texas received 0.67 inches (17 mm) of freezing rain. Dallas set a daily snowfall record on January 31, at 1.3 inches (3.3 cm).

In Texas, at least 350,000 people were left without power as a result of the storm due to tree limbs and power lines being brought down to ice. Of those 350,000 people, 160,000 were in Austin. This can be contrasted with Winter Storm Uri, wherein 4.5 million people were left without power due to, among other things, demand exceeding supply. On February 4, Governor Greg Abbott of Texas issued a disaster declaration for a seven county area.

At least 1,600 flights have been canceled, 888 of them in Dallas Fort Worth International Airport, with flights from Delta, United, Southwest, and American airlines being cancelled. At least 530,000 power outages were also reported. As of March 20, 2023, more than 166,000 tons of debris produced by the storm had been collected by the City of Austin.

== See also ==
- February 2023 North American cold wave
