= March 2023 North American winter storm =

North American winter storm in 2023

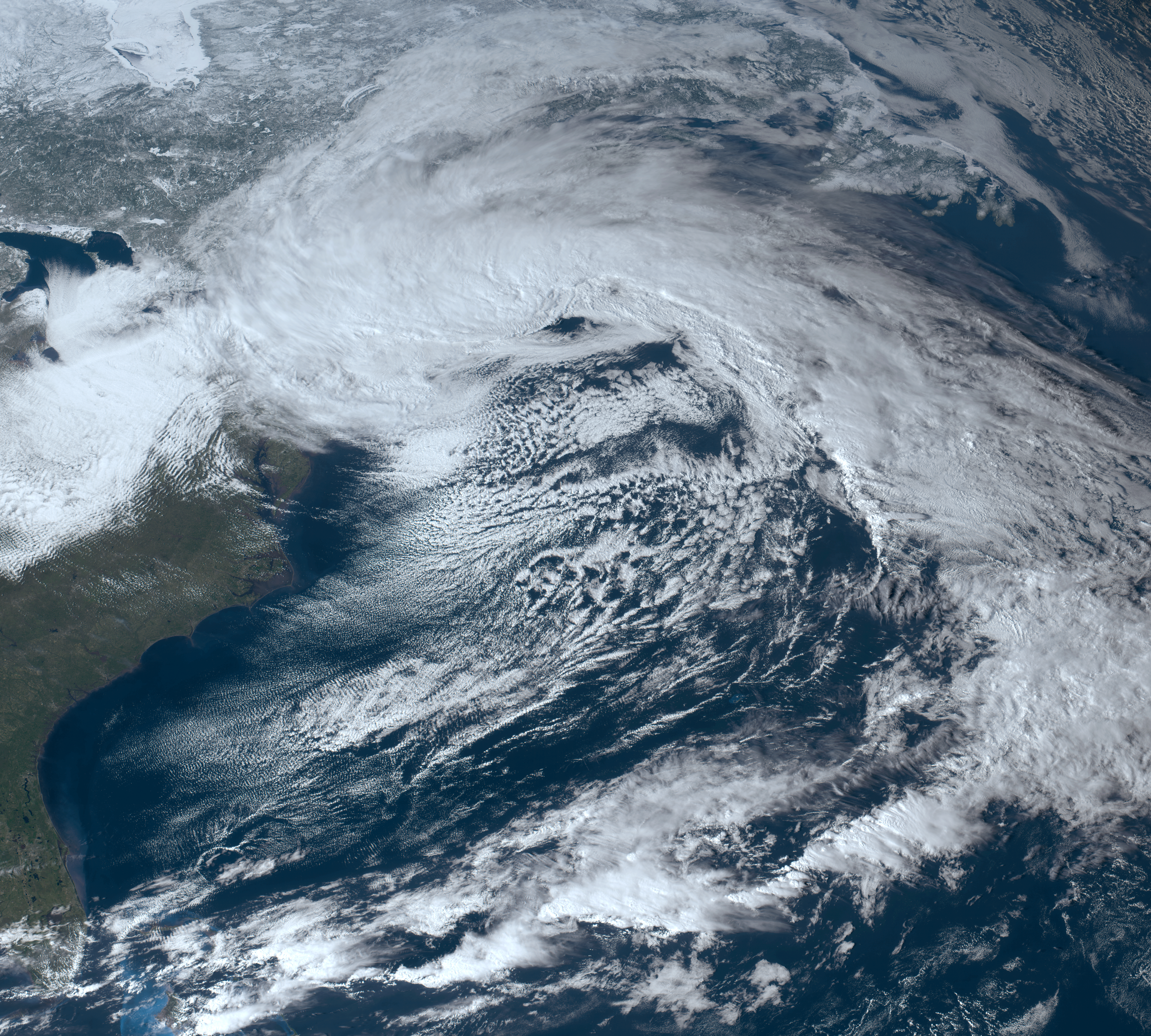
- Satellite image of the winter storm moving across the Northeastern United States during the evening hours of March 14, 2023

Meteorological history
- Formed: March 9, 2023
- Dissipated: March 17, 2023

Category 2 "Minor" winter storm
- Regional snowfall index: 3.64 (NOAA)
- Lowest pressure: 980 mbar (hPa); 28.94 inHg
- Max. rainfall: 13 in (330 mm) King City, California
- Max. snowfall: 42.1 in (107 cm) in Readsboro, Vermont

Overall effects
- Fatalities: 3
- Injuries: 2
- Damage: $215 million (2023 USD)
- Areas affected: Western, Northern and Northeastern United States
- Power outages: >320,000
- Part of the 2022–23 North American winter

A winter storm in March 2023, unofficially named Winter Storm Sage by The Weather Channel, impacted much of the Western, Northern, and Northeastern United States, producing high snowfall totals and widespread damage across the region. The winter storm first progressed across the Western United States as an atmospheric river, and then moved across the northern United States, bringing blizzard conditions and moderate snowfall across the Northern U.S. The winter storm then became a nor'easter and impacted the Northeast, bringing snowfall rates of 1–2 inches (2.5–5.1 cm) per hour across numerous locations across the Northeast and 3 feet (36 in) of snow in several locations across the region with locally higher amounts. More than 320,000 power outages occurred across the areas impacted by the winter storm, and caused three fatalities and two injuries. Readsboro, Vermont received 42.1 inches (107 cm) of snow, and nearly 200 car accidents occurred across the New England region in the Northeast.

== Meteorological synopsis ==
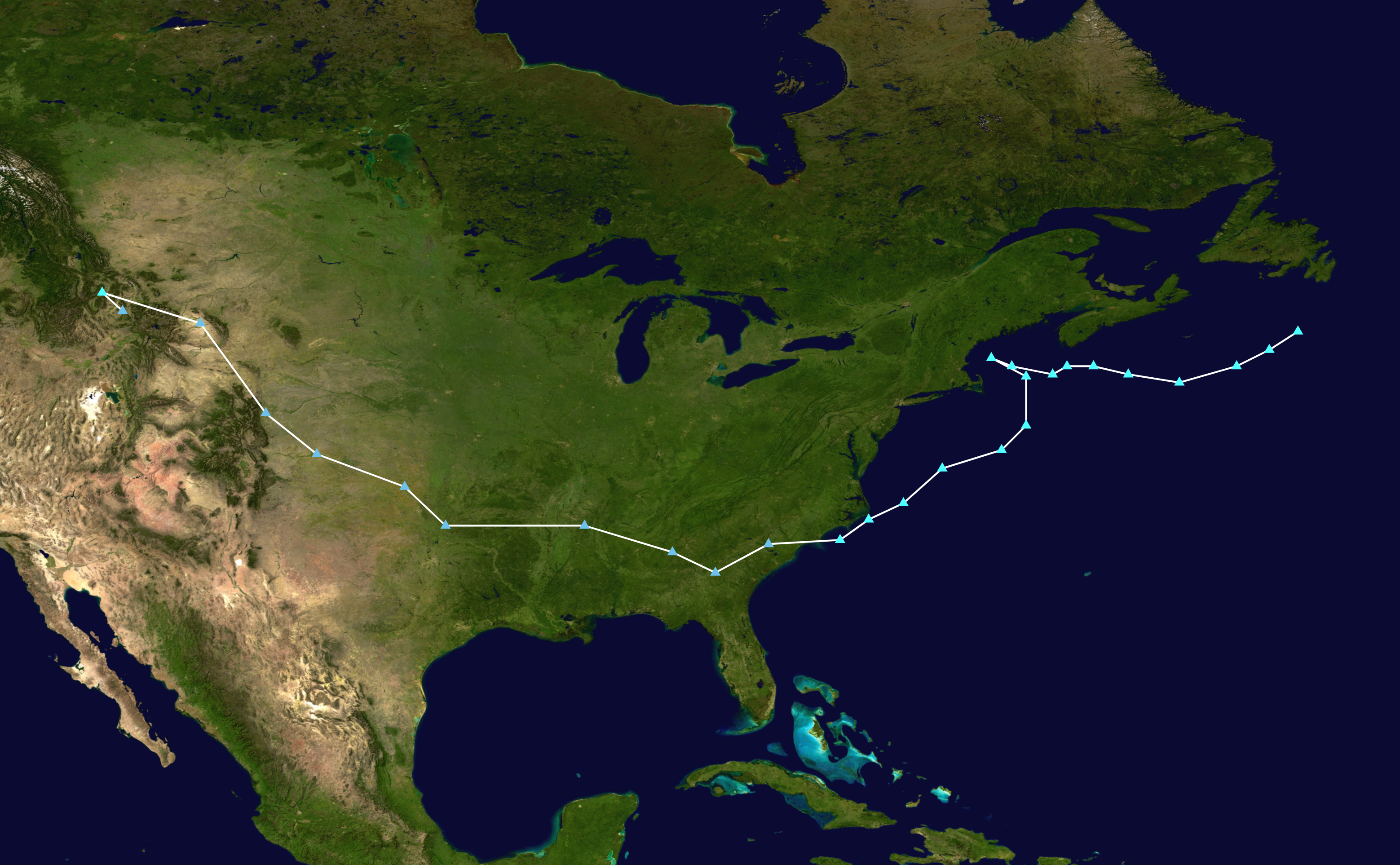
Map plotting the storm's track and intensity, according to the Saffir–Simpson scale Map key Saffir–Simpson scale Tropical depression (≤38 mph, ≤62 km/h) Tropical storm (39–73 mph, 63–118 km/h) Category 1 (74–95 mph, 119–153 km/h) Category 2 (96–110 mph, 154–177 km/h) Category 3 (111–129 mph, 178–208 km/h) Category 4 (130–156 mph, 209–251 km/h) Category 5 (≥157 mph, ≥252 km/h) Unknown Storm type Tropical cyclone Subtropical cyclone Extratropical cyclone, remnant low, tropical disturbance, or monsoon depression

On March 10, a frontal system moved eastward across the western U.S. from the Pacific Northwest, with the main low pressure area associated with the system located offshore of southwestern Washington and a separate area of low-pressure east of the California/Nevada border. As a result, an atmospheric river developed, bringing heavy rainfall and high snow accumulations to portions of the Western United States and Sierra Nevada. The atmospheric river then transitioned into a winter storm as it then moved across the northern United States on March 11–12, bringing blizzard conditions and moderate snowfall across the Northern United States, producing additional snowfall accumulations across the region. The winter storm then became a nor'easter as another low-pressure area developed off the Carolina coast and moved northward along the coastline of the Northeastern United States, bringing snowfall rates of 1–2 inches (2.5–5.1 cm) per hour across numerous locations across the Northeast for the next several days. The winter storm brought 3 feet (36 in) of snow in some locations across the Northeastern United States, with locally higher amounts. The winter storm then moved offshore on March 15, dissipating two days later.

== Preparations ==
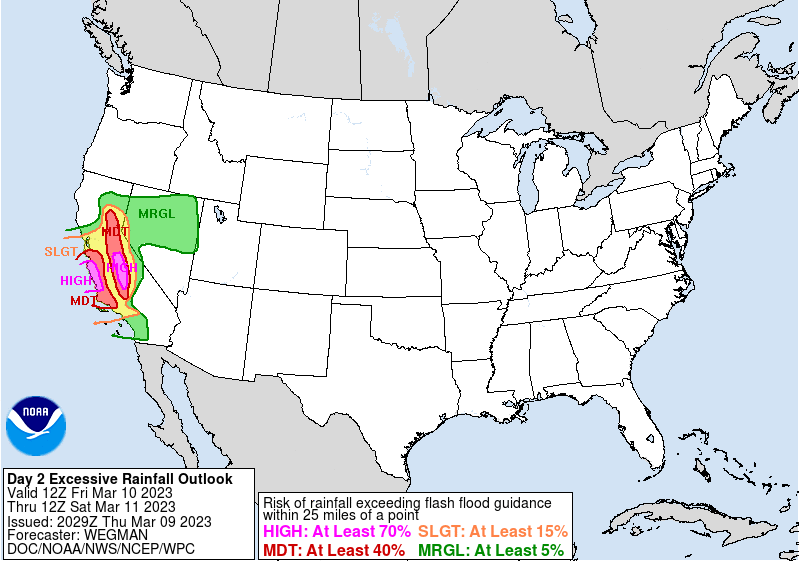
A Day 2 excessive rainfall outlook showing a level 4/high risk of excessive rainfall across central California issued by the Weather Prediction Center on March 9, 2023

California governor Gavin Newsom declared a state of emergency for 34 counties in the state. Governor Newsom also requested an emergency declaration for the state, which was accepted by United States president Joe Biden. A rare level 4/high risk of excessive rainfall was issued by the Weather Prediction Center for portions of the state. More than 25 million people were placed under a flood watch in California, and several ski resorts closed in California in anticipation of heavy snowfall. In neighboring Nevada, governor Joe Lombardo issued a state of emergency for three counties in the state, which was later expanded to eight more counties.

On March 13, New York governor Kathy Hochul declared a state of emergency and a travel ban for several counties in New York. The Metropolitan Transit Authority of New York City shut down walkways on the Cross Bay Bridge and Marine Parkway–Gil Hodges Memorial Bridge, and monitored to see if other bridges, subways or buses needed to be shut down.

Connecticut Governor Ned Lamont banned all tractor-trailers on Interstate 84 in the early morning hours on March 14 in preparation for the storm. Maine Governor Janet Mills ordered all government offices to close.

Prior to the winter storm, Jon Palmer of the National Weather Service office in Gray, Maine, stated that the precipitation may cause significant power disruptions that last for over 48 hours. Cornell University shut down on March 14 in preparation for the snow. The National Weather Service issued winter storm warnings and winter weather advisories from Pennsylvania to Maine.

== Impact ==
=== Western United States ===
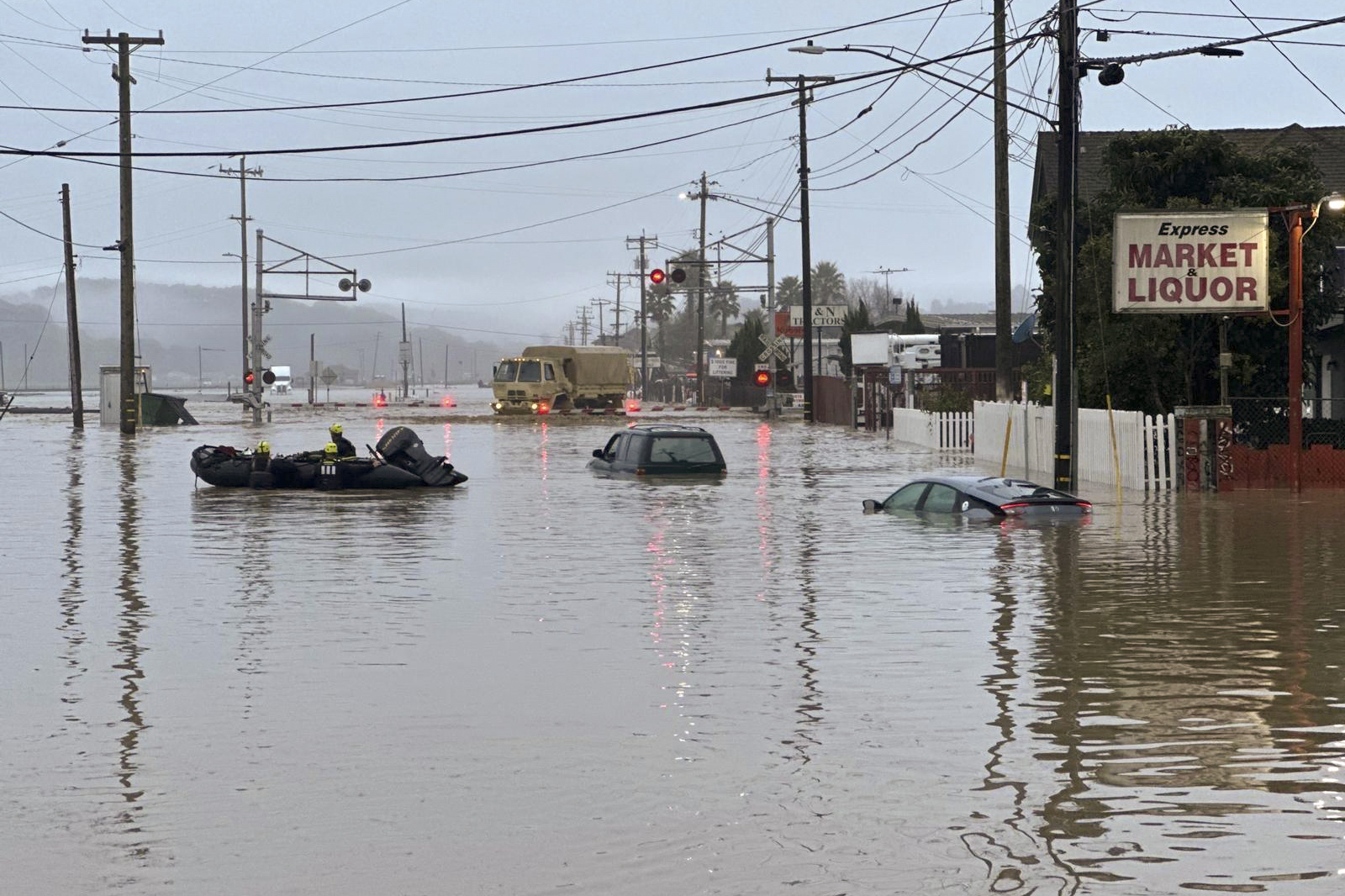
The California Army National Guard assisting local responders with rescue operations during flooding in Monterey County, California on March 11, 2023

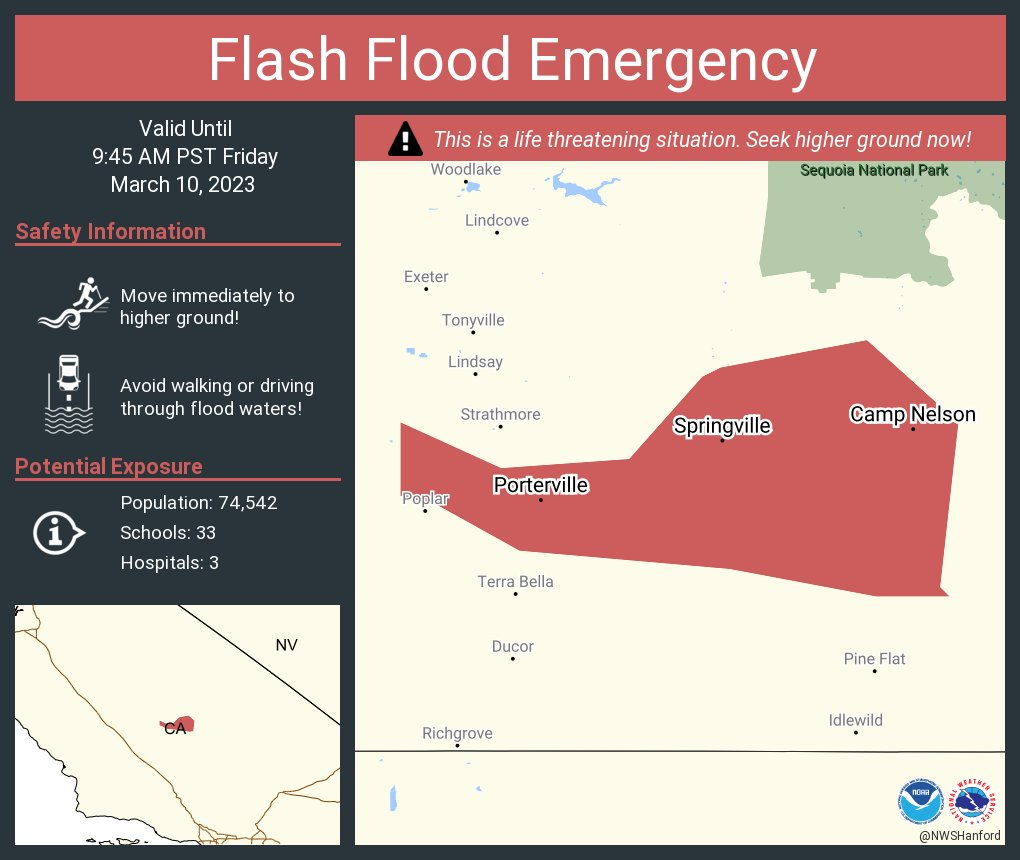
A rare flash flood emergency issued by the National Weather Service for Porterville, Springville, and Camp Nelson, California, on March 10, 2023

The strong atmospheric river that developed into the winter storm impacted California on March 10, producing heavy rainfall which caused flooding across lower elevations of the state, and heavy snowfall which brought high snowfall totals across the Sierra Nevada mountains. A road leading to the town of Soquel collapsed due to flooding after a pipe failure, and widespread flooding and strong winds led to separated roads, collapsed bridges, and downed trees in Tulare County while a rare flash flood emergency was in effect there. The San Lorenzo River crested, which prompted evacuation orders for Soquel Village, Paradise Park, and Felton Grove as several other rivers also crested to above flood levels. Nearly 60 people were evacuated from a RV park near Sanger, and several people and animals were also rescued across San Luis Obispo County. Twenty-five "weather-related incidents", including several water rescues, occurred across the city of Fresno. Across the state, widespread amounts of 3–10 inches (76–254 mm) of rain fell, with locally higher amounts of up to nearly 13 inches (330 mm) of rainfall in King City. A levee was breached due to a swollen Pajaro River, which flooded Pajaro entirely, with the California Army National Guard rescuing more than 200 people there. An evacuation order was also given for portions of Cambria due to flooding. Several homes were flooded after the Tule River overflowed its banks, and to prevent flooding, the Folsom Dam released 30,000 cubic feet (850,000 L) of water every second in Sacramento County. Portions of California State Route 1 and California State Route 12 were closed, and several people evacuated in Watsonville after flooding ensued across portions of the city. Heavy rainfall closed several public parks, including Kings Canyon National Park and Sequoia National Park. California State Route 84 between Portola Road and Skyline Boulevard was closed indefinitely due to damage from a landslide, resulting in the road buckling and leaving behind large cracks. Nearly 9,400 people were placed under evacuation orders. Across the state, 55,000 power outages occurred, and one person was killed and one person was injured after a portion of the roof of a warehouse collapsed. The heavy snowfall across the Sierra Nevada mountain range led to collapsed roofs across South Lake Tahoe. In California, damages from the atmospheric river amounted to more than $3 million.

In neighboring Nevada, a portion of U.S. Route 95 was shut down between Schurz and Hawthorne. The town of Mount Charleston received 1.38 inches (35 mm) of rain, and the visitor center at the Red Rock Canyon National Conservation Area recorded a 52 miles per hour (84 km/h) wind gust. In Nevada, flood and winter weather impacts resulted in more than $12 million in property damages.

=== Northern United States ===
==== North Dakota ====
On March 11, blizzard conditions occurred across portions of the state, which forced closures on Interstate 94 between Jamestown and Dickinson, as well as on U.S. Route 52. Near Park River, 14 inches (36 cm) of snow fell, and nearly 6 inches (15 cm) of snowfall accumulated in Bismarck. Several vehicles were stuck on portions of North Dakota Highway 36, and a no travel advisory around the Grand Forks area. Travel was also significantly impacted on Interstate 94 west of Fargo, Interstate 29 between Fargo and Grand Forks, and U.S. Route 2. In McKenzie County, there were $200,000 in property damages, and one person was killed after his vehicle crashed into a semi-trailer truck; the driver of the semi-trailer was also injured.

==== Minnesota and Wisconsin ====
In Minnesota, high snowfall totals were observed across northern portions of the state, with a weather station recording 18.5 inches (47 cm) west of Two Harbors. Blizzard conditions also occurred in Detroit Lakes. A mall in Duluth had its roof collapse due to the weight of the snow.

In Wisconsin, the highest snowfall totals were recorded mainly across northern and eastern portions of the state, with 22 inches (56 cm) of snowfall near Cornucopia and Sheboygan receiving 13.2 inches (34 cm) of snow. Due to the high snow accumulations, several schools were closed or delayed opening hours across the state.

=== Northeastern United States ===
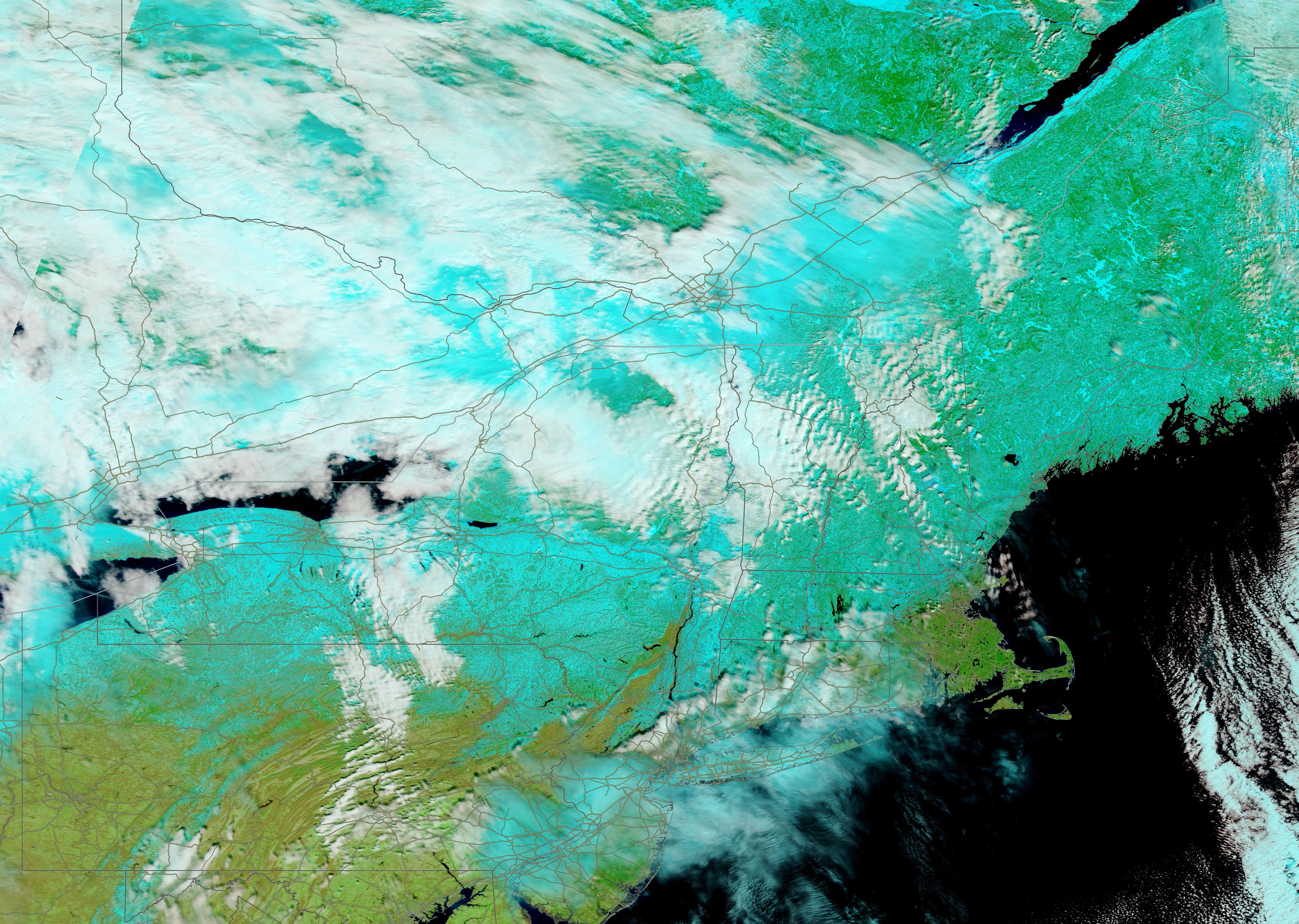
Snowfall across the Northeastern U.S. after the nor'easter on March 16, 2023

During the storm, 284,000 customers lost power across the Northeast, and low visibility led to over 200 car crashes in New England.

==== New England ====
High snow accumulations occurred across mainly southern portions of Vermont, with Readsboro receiving 42.1 inches (107 cm) of snow and Landgrove recording 40 inches (100 cm) of snowfall. Several car accidents occurred across the state. Nearly 30,000 power outages occurred across Vermont, including nearly 25 percent of Brattleboro, where more than 30 roads were closed.

In New Hampshire, snow and ice resulted in the Piscataqua River Bridge being shut down for around an hour, and Interstate 93 was shut down temporarily due to downed power lines caused by the winter storm. A sportsdome in Goffstown deflated after 16 inches (41 cm) of snow fell there. Whiteout conditions occurred on portions of New Hampshire Route 101, and more than 120 vehicle accidents occurred. Nearly 70 towns postponed elections, and one girl was injured after a tree fell on her in Derry. More than 73,000 power outages occurred across the state, and a 66 miles per hour (106 km/h) wind gust was recorded at Mount Washington Observatory.

Several locations in eastern Massachusetts experienced wind gusts of over 50 miles per hour (80 km/h), with Rockport recording the highest wind gust in the state, at 63 miles per hour (101 km/h). Downed trees and power lines occurred across the state, including in Pittsfield. Several cows were killed after a barn collapsed after high snowfall accumulations in Dracut. In Colrain, 36 inches (91 cm) of snow fell, and in Peterboro, 35 inches (89 cm) of snow fell. More than 50,000 power outages occurred across Massachusetts. As a result of the winter storm, a state of emergency was declared for several jurisdictions across the state. The winter storm was the most impactful in the state of the 2022–23 North American winter.

More than 15,000 power outages occurred in Maine, and an additional 13,000 outages occurred in Connecticut. Bradley International Airport closed and cancelled 40% of their flights for that day.

==== New York ====
A Delta plane skidded off the runway at Syracuse Hancock Airport. Near Palenville, 36 inches (91 cm) of snow fell, and Stony Creek and Moriah received the same amount. Over 100,000 people in the Albany, New York metropolitan area lost power. Farther south, the nor'easter forced a ground stop at LaGuardia Airport. Portions of Long Island received up to 2.2 inches (5.6 cm) of snowfall. Very little snow fell in New York City, with Central Park receiving only a trace of snow, and LaGuardia and Kennedy Airport receiving just 0.1 inches (0.25 cm) of snow. Wind gusts reached as high as 50 mph (80 km/h) in Midtown Manhattan. However, very heavy snow fell in the Hudson Valley, with the Mount Carmel District recording 17 inches (43 cm) of snow and with over 6 inches (15 cm) of snow falling in portions of Westchester. More than 73,000 power outages occurred across the state, which led to more than 8,000 utility crews deployed to assist with power restoration.

==== Elsewhere ====
Heavy rain fell throughout the New York metropolitan area, accumulating up to 4.12 inches (105 mm) of rainfall in Higganum, Connecticut. While portions of New Jersey received over 8 inches (20 cm) of snow, very little snow fell close to the coast in lower elevations, with Newark, New Jersey recording 0.4 inches (1.0 cm) of snow. Wind gusts in New Jersey reached as high as 54 mph (87 km/h) in Beach Haven, with a 44 mph (71 km/h) gust occurring in Newark. More than 12,000 customers lost power in Pennsylvania as snow fell across western and northeastern portions of the state, including the Pittsburgh and Scranton areas.
