= Westwood Colony, South Dakota =

- Census-designated place
- Location within South Dakota Location within the United States
- Coordinates: 45°53′34″N 97°46′53″W
- Country: United States
- State: South Dakota
- County: Marshall

Area
  - Total: 1.01 sq mi (2.61 km^{2})
  - Land: 1.01 sq mi (2.61 km^{2})
  - Water: 0 sq mi (0.00 km^{2})
- Elevation: 1,309 ft (399 m)

Population (2020)
  - Total: 8
  - Density: 7.9/sq mi (3.06/km^{2})
- Time zone: UTC-6 (Central (CST))
  - Summer (DST): UTC-5 (CDT)
- ZIP Code: 57430 (Britton)
- Area code: 605
- FIPS code: 46-70646
- GNIS feature ID: 2813048

Westwood Colony is a Hutterite colony and census-designated place (CDP) in Marshall County, South Dakota, United States. The population was 8 at the 2020 census. It was first listed as a CDP prior to the 2020 census.

It is in the northwest part of the county, 5 miles (8 km) by road west of Kidder and 9 miles (14 km) north of Britton, the county seat.

== Demographics ==
Historical population
Census	Pop.	Note	%±
2020	8		—
U.S. Decennial Census
