= January–February 2026 North American cold wave =

Weather event in North America

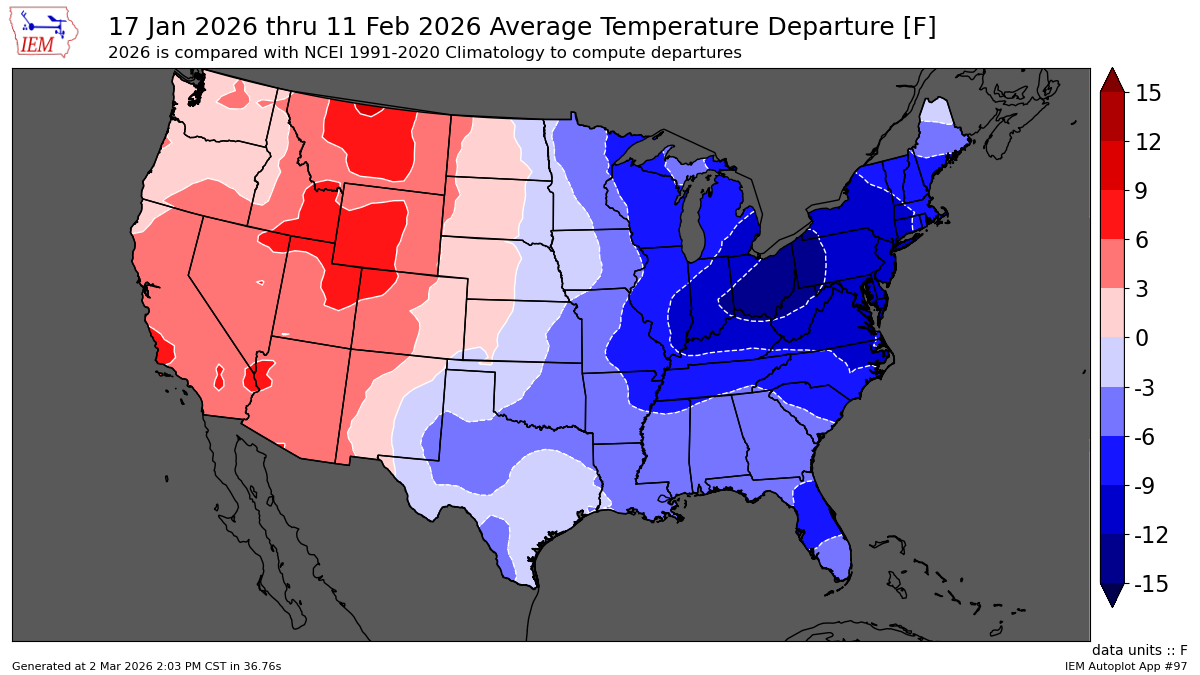
- Temperature anomaly map for the duration of the cold wave from January 17 to February 11, 2026 in the United States, showing well-below average temperatures

Meteorological history
- Formed: January 17, 2026
- Dissipated: February 11, 2026

Cold wave
- Lowest temp: −43.7 °C (−46.7 °F) in Kirkland Lake, Ontario on January 24

Overall effects
- Fatalities: 22
- Damage: $4 billion (2026 USD)
- Areas affected: Canada, United States, Mexico, Greater Antilles, The Bahamas, Central America
- Part of the 2025–26 North American winter

The January–February 2026 North American cold wave was an extreme weather event that brought bitterly cold temperatures to the majority of the North American continent, particularly the countries of Canada, the United States, Mexico and Central America during the second half of January through early February 2026. The reach of the cold temperatures extended far across the continent, reaching as far south as Belize. It was caused by a southward migration of the polar vortex, following a sudden stratospheric warming (SSW) event at the start of 2026. A winter storm at the end of the month reinforced the pattern, which continued into the first week of February. Several winter weather events associated with the cold wave proliferated across the United States, allowing snow to reach as far south as Texas and Florida. The cold wave caused damaging and sometimes crippling effects across numerous parts of North America.

At least 22 deaths have been directly attributed to the cold wave, with many more caused by the inclement winter weather that was associated with the temperatures. The cold wave and associated weather are estimated to have caused at least US$4 billion (2026 USD) in damages. Record low temperatures were set across the continent, even as far south as Central America. Bitterly cold wind chills were also prevalent in the northernmost portions of the U.S. Millions of people lost power, mostly as a result of the January winter storm in the south due to snow and ice, but also as a result of extreme cold.

== Background ==
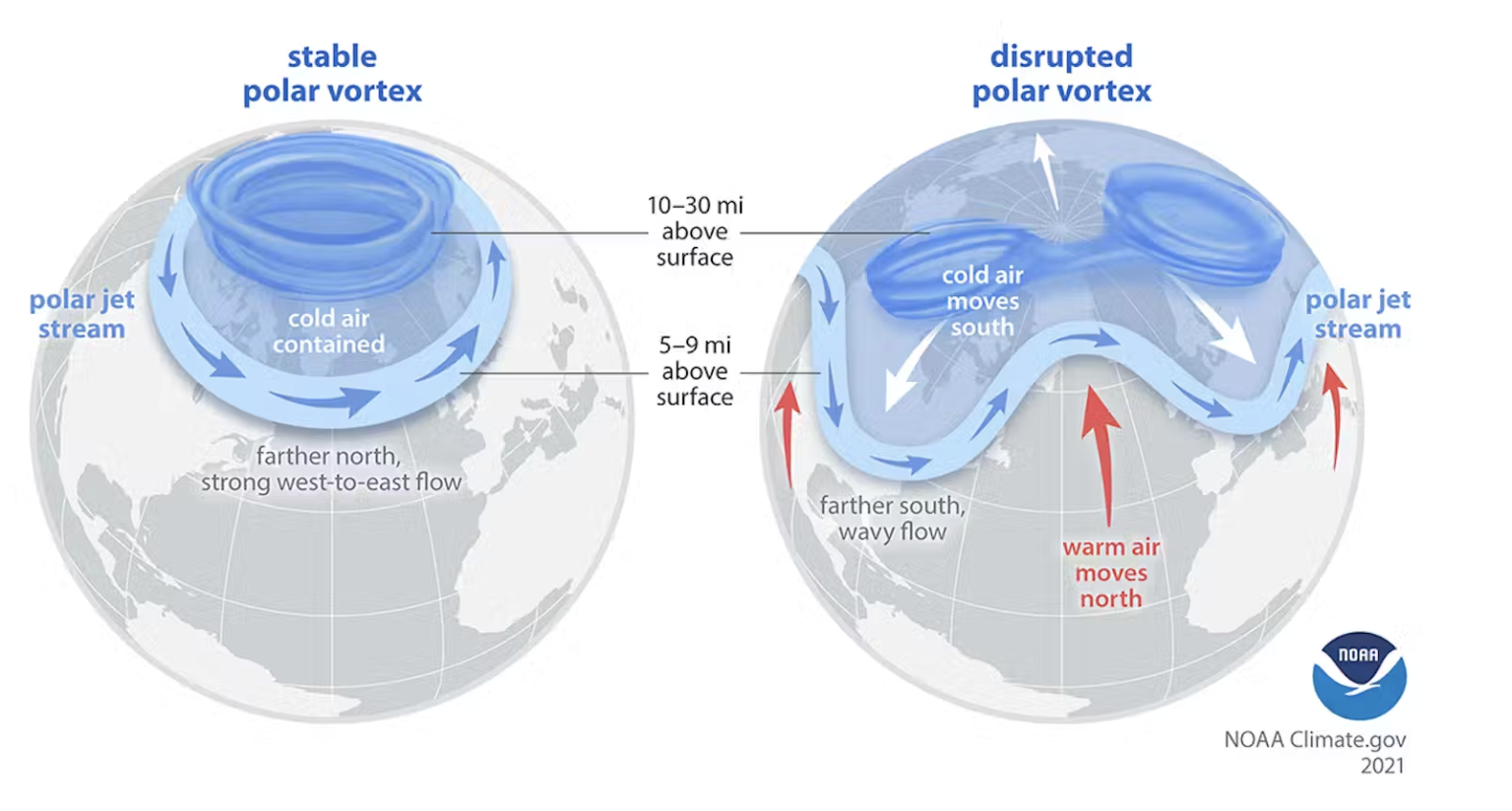
Example of how a piece of the polar vortex "detaches" and moves southward, bringing cold temperatures to the U.S. and other countries

As with most cold waves, the origins of the cold wave occurred when the polar vortex migrated southwards in mid-January after a brief period of mild temperatures during the last week of December 2025 and beginning of January across much of the United States. The weakening of the jet stream is likely to have been caused by a sudden stratospheric warming (SSW) event that occurred at the start of 2026. By January 17, colder air began moving southeast into the U.S., as a cold front began moving through the United States. Several days later on January 23, an arctic front pushed southward from Canada into the central U.S., ushering in extremely cold temperatures.

A major winter storm then moved eastwards in late January, which pushed the cold front even further south through the Southeastern U.S., bringing the coldest temperatures observed in some spots since 2010. The front pushed as far south as Central America, breaking records there as well. The pattern persisted in February, although the extreme cold was now confined to the eastern half of the U.S.

== Temperatures ==
=== Canada ===
Three towns in Saskatchewan broke cold weather records on January 22 at night. Many more towns in the province also had broken records by January 25. Kirkland Lake, Ontario saw a temperature of −43.7 °C (−46.7 °F) early on January 24, the coldest since 1984. The Toronto Pearson Airport, Trenton, and London had the coldest temperatures in several years that day as well. In Manitoba, several towns broke temperature records on January 24 and January 25, measuring in between −36.6 – −42.3 °C (−33.9 – −44.1 °F). For the first time since the winter of 2014–15, parts of southern Ontario had over 16 consecutive days of below-freezing temperatures. Windsor had 12 consecutive days of or below 0 °C (32 °F), Toronto, Ottawa, and Hamilton had 16 days of consecutive freezing temperatures, Montreal had 18, and Timmins had 24 consecutive days.

=== United States ===
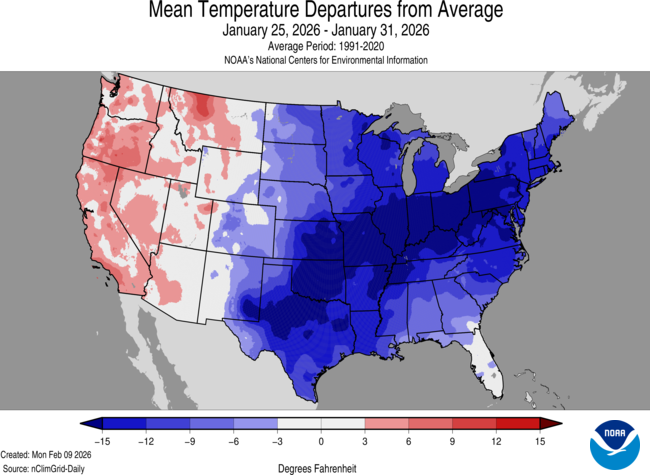
Temperature anomaly map during the most intense period of the cold wave, during the week of January 25–31 in the U.S.

On the morning of January 16, several cities in Florida had freezing temperatures. Tallahassee recorded a temperature of 20 °F (−7 °C). The first blast of cold air impacted most of the country on January 19, with International Falls, Minnesota bottoming out at −20 °F (−29 °C). After a brief respite, colder temperatures returned the next weekend. On January 23, Chicago logged a temperature of −11 °F (−24 °C) and a wind chill of −36 °F (−38 °C), the coldest up to that point. On January 24, record low high temperatures were set at many sites across the New York Metropolitan area. That day, a daily record low of −34 °F (−37 °C) was set in Watertown, New York. Eastern Iowa experienced wind chill values below −40 °F (−40 °C). The towns of Forest Center, Kabetogama and Brimson, Minnesota all recorded temperatures of −42 °F (−41 °C) on January 24.

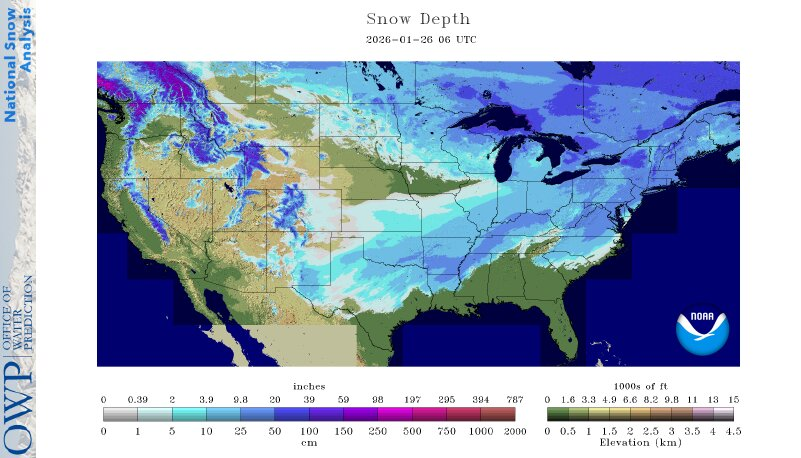
Snow depth in the U.S. on January 27

Elsewhere in Michigan, Grand Rapids recorded a low temperature of −19 °F (−28 °C) on the morning of January 24, which was the coldest temperature recorded in the area since 1994. That same morning, Flint recorded a low temperature of −24 °F (−31 °C), just one degree above the all time record low for the area. Following the January 2026 North American winter storm, extreme cold re-asserted itself over much of the United States. On January 27, Washington D.C. hit a low of 13 °F (−11 °C), and the cold wave would push into Florida. While record highs affected the Miami metropolitan area on January 26 with highs near 90 °F (32 °C), many areas across the metro reported lows of 48–51 °F (9–11 °C) on January 27. Cleveland, Ohio recorded eight consecutive days with high temperatures of 17 °F (−8 °C) or below, January 24−31, tying records from 1893 and 1899. Shreveport, Louisiana reached as low as 17 °F (−8 °C) during the winter storm on January 25.

Some cities in Florida had the coldest temperatures since 2010 on February 1. Tampa saw a temperature of 28 °F (−2 °C). 35 °F (2 °C) was recorded at Miami and Fort Lauderdale. Orlando measured a temperature of 25 °F (−4 °C). Daytona Beach recorded a temperature of 23 °F (−5 °C), setting the record for the coldest February day. Melbourne set the coldest February day on February 1 and 2. Across the Southeast, many cities set daily low records on February 2. Gainesville, Florida set a daily low record of 22 °F (−6 °C). A record of 12 °F (−11 °C) was recorded in Fayetteville, Arkansas. Greensboro, North Carolina had a record low of 3 °F (−16 °C). Jacksonville, Florida had a record-tying eight consecutive freezing mornings on February 3. Portions of the New York metropolitan area had one of the longest consecutive days of temperatures at or below 0 °C (32 °F) since 1963, lasting up to a total of 13 days, ending on February 6. The second-coldest February temperature for New York was recorded on February 8 in Waterton.

=== Mexico ===
Felipe Carrillo Puerto, Mexico had the coldest temperature in over 40 years, recording 4.2 °C (39.6 °F) on the morning of February 2. Other cities in Quintana Roo saw temperatures not seen in decades. Playa Del Carmen and José María Morelos reported 9 °C (48 °F). Chetumal recorded a temperature of 11 °C (52 °F). Cancún had a temperature of 11 °C (52 °F).

=== Greater Antilles and Central America ===
Perico, Cuba recorded a record-low temperature of 0 °C (32 °F) on February 3, setting a national record in Cuba for the coldest temperature observed there on record. Other stations in Cuba set all-time lows respectively on February 3, including 3 °C (37 °F) in Aguada de Pasajeros, 7 °C (44 °F) in Jucarito and Santa Cruz del Sur, and tied a record of 14 °C (57 °F) in Guantanamo Bay. In The Bahamas, the temperature reached a high of only 11 °C (51 °F) on February 1 in Freeport, the coldest high temperature there on record.

Further south, in Guatemala, a record-tying low temperature of 9 °C (48 °F) was observed in Flores. The mountain range of Finca Los Andes, El Salvador set a record low of 3 °C (38 °F) for the month of February, while Belize reached a low of 6 °C (42 °F), the coldest since 1968.

=== Elsewhere ===
A preliminary temperature reading on February 8 measured 6.6 °C (43.9 °F) on Bermuda, breaking the record set in 1950.

== Impact ==
=== Canada ===
In response to the cold, Regina, Saskatchewan opened three warming centers to shelter the homeless or vulnerable. Newfoundland and Labrador Hydro shut down completely for the first time since 1967 due to the buildup of frazil ice blocking the intake on January 23. The cold snap resulted in thousands losing power in Quebec beginning in the morning of January 24. A total of 13,368 homes in Côte Saint-Luc lost power. An emergency shelter was opened in the city by the Canadian Red Cross. Saskatoon intensified its winter emergency response plan between January 25 and January 28. On January 26, cold temperatures in Quebec led to power outages, during which two were found dead in Montreal.

=== United States ===
A 51-year-old man died from cold exposure in Des Moines. Additionally, a 19-year-old college student was found dead in Ann Arbor, Michigan, after going missing without a coat in frigid conditions. Five deaths occurred in Louisiana which were caused by hypothermia partially related to a winter storm.

By January 25, eleven suspected weather-related fatalities were reported in the New York City area, with exact causes not yet disclosed. By January 31, the Mayor's Office confirmed that as many as 13 people had died on the streets of New York from exposure, most if not all of whom were homeless and/or suffering from mental illness. Mayor Mamdani stated that city outreach workers were continuing to identify, check on, and offer assistance to potential at-risk individuals, while the city's Department of Homeless Services said that "no one who is homeless and seeking shelter in New York City during a code blue will be denied." City officials on February 11 confirmed that a total of 19 died.

Cold temperatures led to extensive ice forming on Lake Erie. Two riders were rescued after their ATV smashed through ice seven miles offshore. Near Port Clinton, Ohio, on February 3, two fishermen were rescued from frigid waters after their vehicle broke through a crack in the ice. 96% of Lake Erie froze by February 5, the highest since 1996. A large crack began to form in the ice on February 8. Emergency measures and protocols were enacted by many counties and jurisdictions in Maryland. 15 deaths were attributed to hypothermia across Maryland in the two weeks following the winter storm. Cold temperatures in New Jersey prompted shelters to extend their operations. The cold snap and a winter storm in New Jersey resulted in 20 cold weather deaths.

=== Cuba ===
Frost was observed on crops planted in Perico, Cuba as a result of the frigid temperatures, causing damage.

== See also ==
- 1994 North American cold wave
- January–March 2014 North American cold wave
- February 2021 North American cold wave
- February 2015 North American cold wave
