= North American cold wave =

North American cold wave may refer to:

- 1936 North American cold wave
- 1985 North American cold wave
- 1994 North American cold wave
- Early 2014 North American cold wave
- November 2014 North American cold wave
- February 2015 North American cold wave
- December 2017–January 2018 North American cold wave
- January–February 2019 North American cold wave
- February 2021 North American cold wave
