= Judah Cohen (climatologist) =

American climatologist

Judah L. Cohen is an American climatologist and seasonal weather forecaster whose research focuses on Arctic variability, snow cover, sea ice, the stratospheric polar vortex, and their relationship to winter weather in the mid-latitudes. He is Director of Seasonal Forecasting at Atmospheric and Environmental Research and has been affiliated with the Massachusetts Institute of Technology.

== Education and career ==
Cohen received his Ph.D. from Columbia University and was a postdoctoral researcher at the NASA Goddard Institute for Space Studies. Columbia College Today identifies him as a graduate of Columbia College, class of 1985, and Columbia Graduate School of Arts and Sciences, class of 1994.

He has worked as Director of Seasonal Forecasting at Atmospheric and Environmental Research and as a visiting scientist at MIT's Parsons Laboratory. His work has focused on subseasonal-to-seasonal prediction, particularly the relationship between Arctic climate variability and winter weather patterns in North America, Europe, and Asia.

== Research ==
Cohen's research examines how snow cover, sea ice, and Arctic atmospheric conditions may influence winter climate in the mid-latitudes. Columbia College Today described his forecasting approach as placing unusual emphasis on Siberian snow cover in October as a predictor of winter conditions in the eastern United States and Europe. Bloomberg News has also covered Cohen's use of Siberian snow cover and polar-vortex behavior in seasonal winter forecasts.

In 2021, Cohen was the lead author of a paper in Science titled "Linking Arctic variability and change with extreme winter weather in the United States." The paper argued that Arctic change, including sea-ice loss and increased Siberian snow cover, may be associated with disruptions of the stratospheric polar vortex and episodes of extreme winter weather in parts of the United States. The study was covered by the Associated Press and The Washington Post, which reported on its proposed connection between Arctic warming, polar-vortex disruption, and severe winter weather in parts of the United States.

Cohen has also published research on Arctic warming and winter weather in Nature Communications and Communications Earth & Environment. A 2018 paper coauthored by Cohen, Jennifer Francis, and Karl Pfeiffer linked warm Arctic episodes with an increased frequency of extreme winter weather in the United States. In 2024, Cohen, Francis, and Pfeiffer published a related paper in Communications Earth & Environment on anomalous Arctic warming and severe winter weather in Northern Hemisphere continents.

Cohen has also studied stretched stratospheric polar vortex events and their relationship to cold extremes in North America and Eurasia. A 2018 paper coauthored by Cohen distinguished different stratospheric influences on cold extremes in northern Eurasia and North America, including a stretched-vortex pattern. Cohen and coauthors later linked stretched polar vortex events to the North American winter of 2013–2014 and to cold-air outbreaks in the continental United States.

== Public commentary ==
Cohen is frequently quoted in news coverage of the polar vortex and winter weather. In January 2025, the Associated Press quoted Cohen in coverage of Arctic air outbreaks and polar-vortex behavior, identifying him as seasonal forecast director at Atmospheric and Environmental Research. In January 2026, the Associated Press again quoted Cohen, identifying him as a winter weather expert and MIT research scientist, in an article about a stretched polar vortex and a major winter blast in the United States. In a 2010 opinion essay in The New York Times, Cohen argued that Arctic warming and changes in Eurasian snow cover could contribute to severe winter weather in parts of the mid-latitudes.

== Forecasting competitions ==
Cohen has also worked on machine-learning approaches to subseasonal forecasting. In 2019, MIT reported that Cohen, Ernest Fraenkel, Stanford graduate students, and a Microsoft researcher won first place in three of four temperature forecasting categories in the Subseasonal Climate Forecast Rodeo Competition. In 2026, MIT News reported that Cohen's model won first place for the fall season in the 2025 AI WeatherQuest subseasonal forecasting competition run by the European Centre for Medium-Range Weather Forecasts.

Cohen co-authored a study published in Nature on October 14, 2026, describing probabilistic bias correction, a machine-learning framework for improving subseasonal weather forecasts. The team's MicroDuet system ranked first for both three- and four-week forecasts over the full year evaluated in the European Centre for Medium-Range Weather Forecasts' AI Weather Quest competition.

== Selected publications ==
- Cohen, Judah; Entekhabi, Dara. "Eurasian snow cover variability and Northern Hemisphere climate predictability." Geophysical Research Letters. 26, no. 3, 1999: 345–348. doi:10.1029/1998GL900321.
- Cohen, Judah; Screen, James A.; Furtado, Jason C.; Barlow, Mathew; Whittleston, David; Coumou, Dim; Francis, Jennifer A.; Dethloff, Klaus; Entekhabi, Dara; Overland, James; Jones, Justin. "Recent Arctic amplification and extreme mid-latitude weather." Nature Geoscience. 7, 2014: 627–637. doi:10.1038/ngeo2234.
- Cohen, Judah; Pfeiffer, Karl; Francis, Jennifer A. "Warm Arctic episodes linked with increased frequency of extreme winter weather in the United States." Nature Communications. 9, 2018. doi:10.1038/s41467-018-02992-9.
- Cohen, Judah; Agel, Laurie; Barlow, Mathew; Garfinkel, Chaim I.; White, Ian. "Linking Arctic variability and change with extreme winter weather in the United States." Science. 373, no. 6559, 2021: 1116–1121. doi:10.1126/science.abi9167.
- Cohen, Judah; Agel, Laurie; Barlow, Mathew; Furtado, Jason C.; Kretschmer, Marlene; Wendt, Vivien. "The Polar Vortex Winter of 2013/2014." Journal of Geophysical Research: Atmospheres. 127, no. 17, 2022. doi:10.1029/2022JD036493.
- Cohen, Judah; Francis, Jennifer A.; Pfeiffer, Karl. "Anomalous Arctic warming linked with severe winter weather in Northern Hemisphere continents." Communications Earth & Environment. 5, 2024. doi:10.1038/s43247-024-01720-0.
- Agel, Laurie; Cohen, Judah; Barlow, Mathew; Pfeiffer, Karl; Francis, Jennifer A.; Garfinkel, Chaim I.; Kretschmer, Marlene. "Cold-air outbreaks in the continental US: Connections with stratospheric variations." Science Advances. 11, no. 28, 2025: eadq9557. doi:10.1126/sciadv.adq9557.
