= February 2021 North American cold wave =

Cold wave in 2021

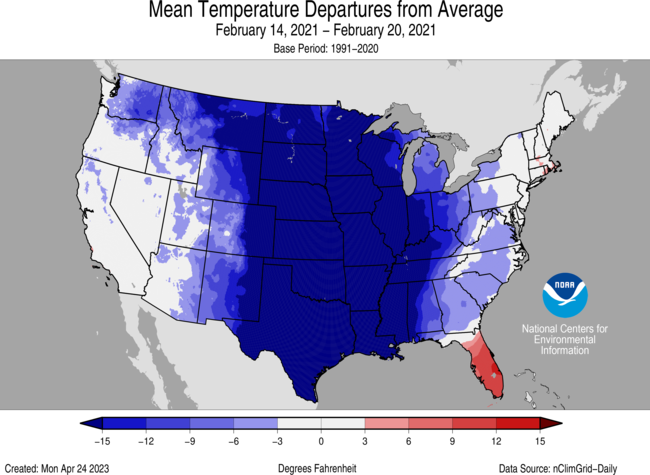
- Temperature anomaly map for the week of February 14–20, 2021, showing the widespread cold across the Central and Eastern United States. Florida is the only state shown in the map with above average temperatures.

Meteorological history
- Formed: February 6, 2021
- Dissipated: February 22, 2021

Cold wave
- Lowest temp: −51.9 °C (−61.4 °F) in Wekweètì, Northwest Territories on February 8

Overall effects
- Fatalities: At least 331 (Note: The death toll and damage is a combination of the February 2021 North American ice storm, February 13-17, 2021 North American winter storm and February 15-20, 2021 North American winter storm, however 3 deaths from the February 13-17, 2021 North American winter storm are excluded because they are tornadic)
- Damage: ≥ $27.575 billion
- Areas affected: Canada, Central United States, Eastern United States, Northern Mexico
- Part of the 2020–21 North American winter

The February 2021 North American cold wave was an extreme weather event that brought record low temperatures to a significant portion of Canada, the United States and parts of northern Mexico during the first two-thirds of February 2021. The cold was caused by a southern migration of the polar vortex, likely caused by a sudden stratospheric warming event that occurred the prior month. Temperatures fell as much as 25–50 °F (14–28 °C) below average as far south as the Gulf Coast. Severe winter storms also were associated with the bitter cold, which allowed for heavy snowfall and ice accumulations to places as far south as Houston, Texas, and contributing to one of the snowiest winters ever in some areas in the Deep South.

With the record cold advancing so far south, effects were crippling and widespread. Many regions within the Southern Plains such as Oklahoma and Texas, in addition to Arkansas, broke or nearly reached record-low temperatures not seen in decades or even a century. In Texas, the record cold caused enormous strain on the power grid and froze pipelines, leading millions to lose power and many pipes to burst. At least 278 people were killed directly or indirectly by severe cold, and the damages are estimated to exceed $27.575 billion (2021 USD), including at least $26.075 billion in the United States and $1.5 billion in Mexico.

== Background ==
As with most cold waves, the origins of the cold wave occurred when the jet stream migrated southward in early February 2021, allowing bitterly cold air spill south into the Upper Midwest and Great Plains. The weakening of the jet stream is likely to have been caused by a sudden stratospheric warming (SSW) event that occurred in early January. However, the effects of this event did not materialize within North America until the pattern began to become unstable near the end of the month. An arctic front then proceeded to usher in the cold air by February 6.

== Record temperatures ==
=== Canada ===
On February 7, 2021 Uranium City, Saskatchewan, equaled their all time coldest temperature of −48.9 °C (−56.0 °F) previously recorded on January 15, 1974. In Winnipeg, Manitoba, the high temperature did not rise above −20.0 °C (−4.0 °F) for 9 consecutive days, the longest period since 1996. On February 7, 2021, the International Airport weather station in Edmonton, Alberta, recorded a low temperature of −43.6 °C (−46.5 °F) with two consecutive lows below −40.0 °C (−40.0 °F).

=== United States ===
The cities of Billings, Montana, and Fargo, North Dakota, experienced their longest streak of sub-zero (0 °F [−18 °C]) temperatures since at least 1983 and 1996, respectively. Des Moines, Iowa, experienced its sixth-coldest February on record with an average temperature of 15.2 °F [−9.3 °C]. The city recorded its coldest temperature of the month on the morning of February 16, with a low temperature of −17 °F [−27 °C]. Two days prior, a record-low high of −4 °F [−20 °C] was recorded. On February 16, Little Rock experienced a temperature of −1 °F [−18 °C], which was the coldest since 1989, with all-time low temperatures being set in Fayetteville, Arkansas, (−20 °F [−29 °C]), Hastings, Nebraska (−30 °F [−34 °C]), and Bottineau, North Dakota (−51 °F [−46 °C]). The cities of Salina, Kansas and Chanute, Kansas spent a record amount of time below 20 °F [−7 °C].

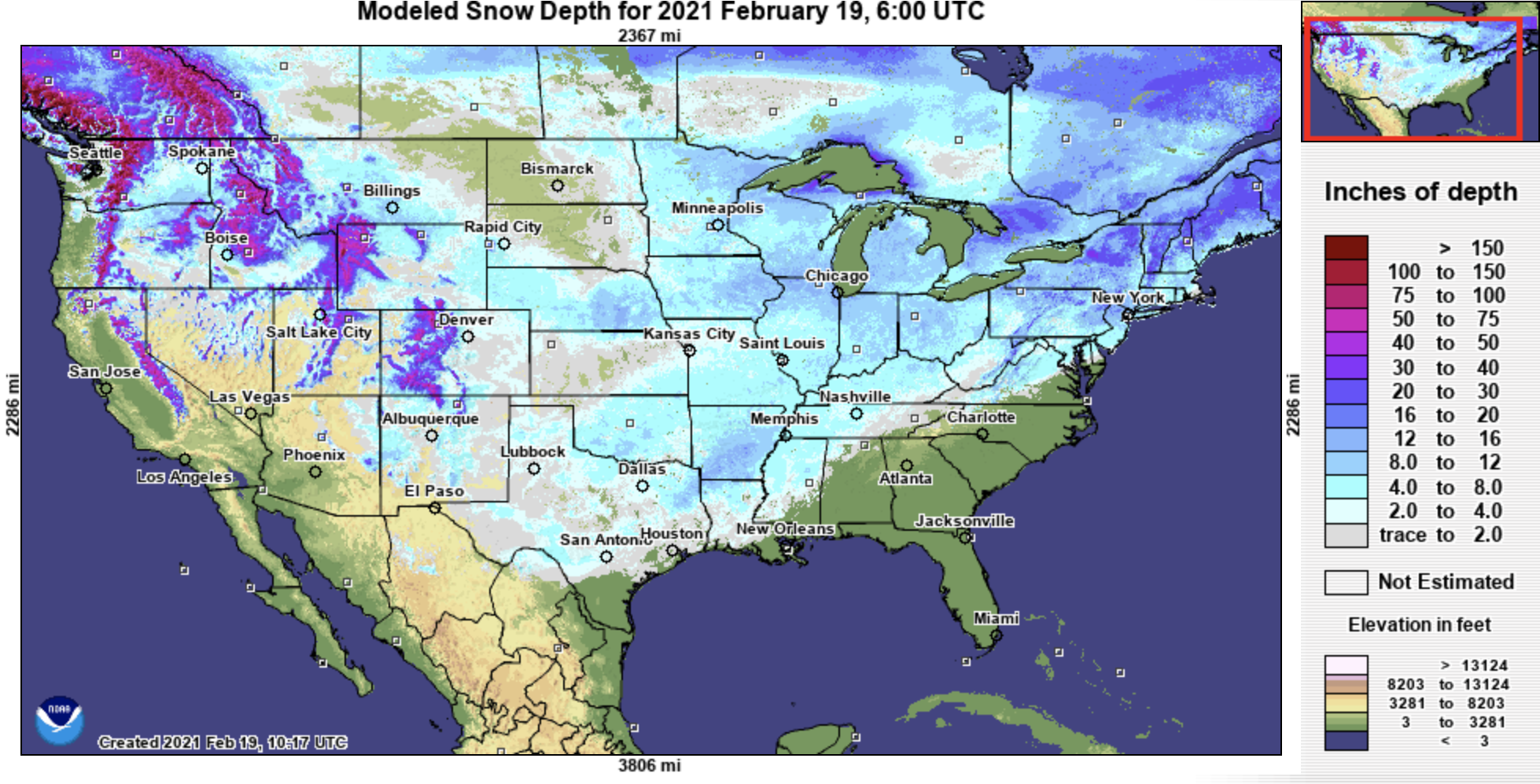
Snow cover across the U.S. on the morning of February 19

Texas experienced temperatures over 50 °F [28 °C] below normal. Records more than a century old were broken: on February 16, daily record lows were broken in Oklahoma City (−14 °F [−26 °C], coldest since 1899 and the second-coldest on record), Dallas (−2 °F [−19 °C], coldest since 1930 and the second-coldest on record), Houston (13 °F [−11 °C], coldest since 1989), and San Antonio (12 °F [−11 °C], coldest since 1989). Waco, Texas experienced a record 205 hours of subfreezing temperatures, while Austin experienced a record 164 hours. This put a strain on the state's power grid, resulting in the Southwest Power Pool and the Electric Reliability Council of Texas both instituting rolling blackouts. The state experienced their second coldest week on record.

Tree limbs and entire trees fell under the weight of the ice, with Salem, Oregon losing 18% of its tree cover. 288,000 households were without electricity in Portland.

=== Mexico ===
In the city of Saltillo, temperatures reached as low as −4.5 °C (23.9 °F) early on February 16 as bitterly cold air surged south from Canada and the United States into the country of Mexico. It was the coldest temperature reported in the city since a cold wave in 2014.

The city of Monterrey registered temperatures as low as −7 °C (19 °F) in the morning of February 15, which was the coldest temperature recorded in the city since 1983. The city also received snow, which is a rare occurrence in the area.

== Impact ==
=== United States ===
Texas by far was the state worst affected by the cold wave. A record low temperature at Dallas/Fort Worth International Airport of −2 °F (−19 °C) on February 16 was the coldest in North Texas in 72 years. Power equipment in Texas was not winterized, leaving it vulnerable to extended periods of cold weather, leading to widespread power outages. Five times as much natural gas as wind power had been lost because of the cold. When power was cut, it disabled some compressors that push gas through pipelines, and the resulting shortage knocked out more gas plants.

== See also ==
- Great Blizzard of 1899
- 1994 North American cold wave
- 2011 Groundhog Day blizzard
- Early 2014 North American cold wave
- February 2015 North American cold wave
- 2021 Western North America heat wave
- February 13–17, 2021 North American winter storm
- February 15–20, 2021 North American winter storm
- December 2022 North American winter storm
