= February 2015 North American cold wave =

Weather event in North America

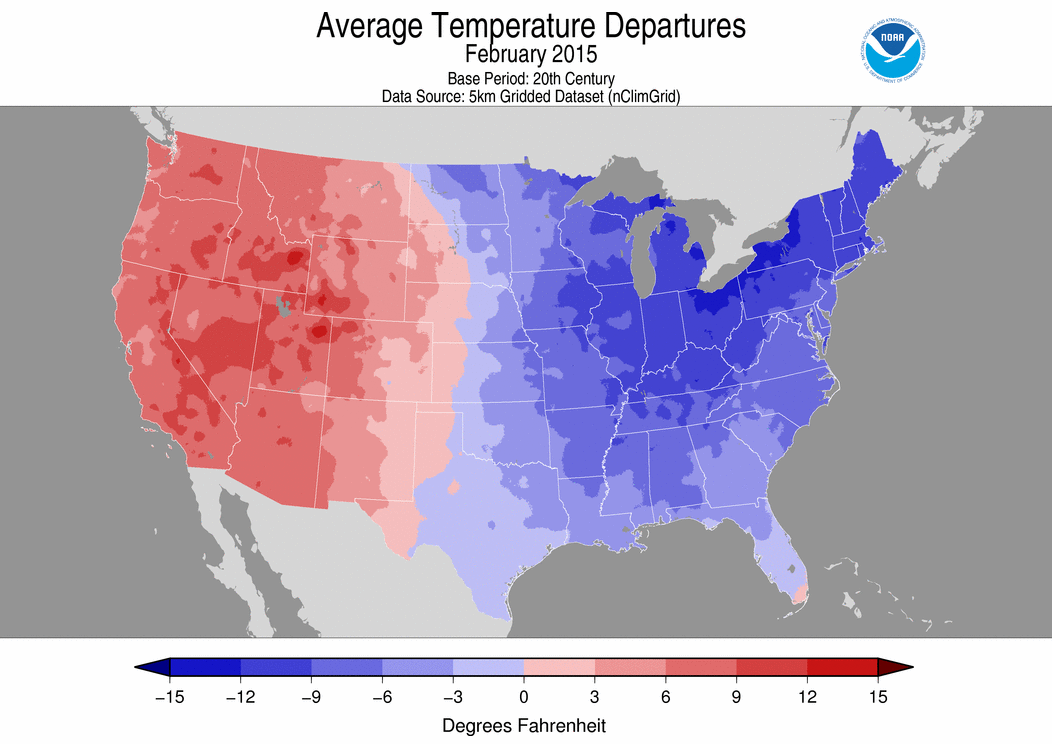
- Average temperature departure for the United States in February 2015, showcasing the well-below average temperatures in the eastern half of the country

Meteorological history
- Formed: Early February 2015
- Dissipated: Mid-March 2015

Cold wave
- Lowest temp: −39 °F (−39 °C) in Roscommon, Michigan on February 20

Overall effects
- Fatalities: 38
- Damage: >$1.4 million
- Areas affected: Canada, East Coast of the United States
- Part of the 2014–15 North American winter

The February 2015 North American cold wave was an extreme weather event that affected most of Canada and the eastern half of the United States. Following an earlier cold wave in the winter, the period of below-average temperatures contributed to an already unusually cold winter for the Eastern U.S. Several places broke their records for their coldest February on record, while some areas came very close. The cause of the cold wave was due to the polar vortex advancing southward into the eastern parts of the U.S., and even making it as far south as the Southeast, where large snow falls are rare. By the beginning of March, although the pattern did continue for the first week, it abated and retreated near the official end of the winter.

In addition to the extremely cold weather, multiple winter storms affected nearly the entire United States, especially in the snow-weary Northeast, which had already seen nearly 3 feet (0.91 m) of snow in the latter part of January; this was added to by roughly 3–4 feet (0.91–1.22 m) more snow, leading to Boston having its highest seasonal snowfall on record.

== Origins ==
Like most American cold waves, this was caused by the southward movement of the polar vortex into the United States due to changes in the jet stream in early February 2015. However, unlike most which last for a few days, this one remained for much of the entire month. This was partly due to the Ridiculously Resilient Ridge, which persisted over parts of Alaska for much of the month, essentially keeping the jet stream pattern "locked" for several weeks. This allowed for bitterly cold air masses to migrate southward into the eastern part of the country, leading to well-below average temperatures.

== Record temperatures ==
=== United States ===
The average temperature in Boston for January was 2.9 °F (1.6 °C) below the 1981–2010 normal, and the average temperature in February was 19.0 °F (−7.2 °C), which was 12.7 °F (7.1 °C) below the 1981–2010 normal, making it the second-coldest month of any month all-time, behind February 1934. March was 5.2 °F (2.9 °C) below average. By the end of a period spanning from the beginning of December to the end of February, Worcester, Massachusetts, saw a record 101.4 inches (258 cm) of snowfall, breaking the 86.7 inches (220 cm) record set in 2004–05, which was 54.3 inches (138 cm) over the average. Hartford, Connecticut, and Providence, Rhode Island, saw similar below-average temperatures for the two months, with Hartford's February finish of 16.1 °F (−8.8 °C) besting February 1934 to become the coldest month of any month all-time in record keeping.

The average temperature in Bangor, Maine, for February was 6.2 °F (−14.3 °C), about 15 °F (8.3 °C) below normal, breaking the old record of 8.4 °F (−13.1 °C) set in January 1994. Portland, Maine, also saw a record coldest average monthly temperature of 13.8 °F (−10.1 °C) in February. On February 24, 2015, the temperature at Dulles International Airport in Northern Virginia dipped to −4 °F (−20 °C), breaking the previous daily record of 14 °F (−10 °C) set in 1967 (but not the all-time low at the airport of -18 °F or -28 °C set on January 22, 1984).

Rutland, Vermont, saw a record averaged cold for February of 5.2 °F (−14.9 °C), breaking its previous record of 7.4 °F (−13.7 °C) set in 1934. Montpelier, Vermont, realized its coldest February with an average temperature of 5.1 °F (−14.9 °C), 3.0 °F (1.7 °C) below the 1979 record of 8.1 °F (−13.3 °C).

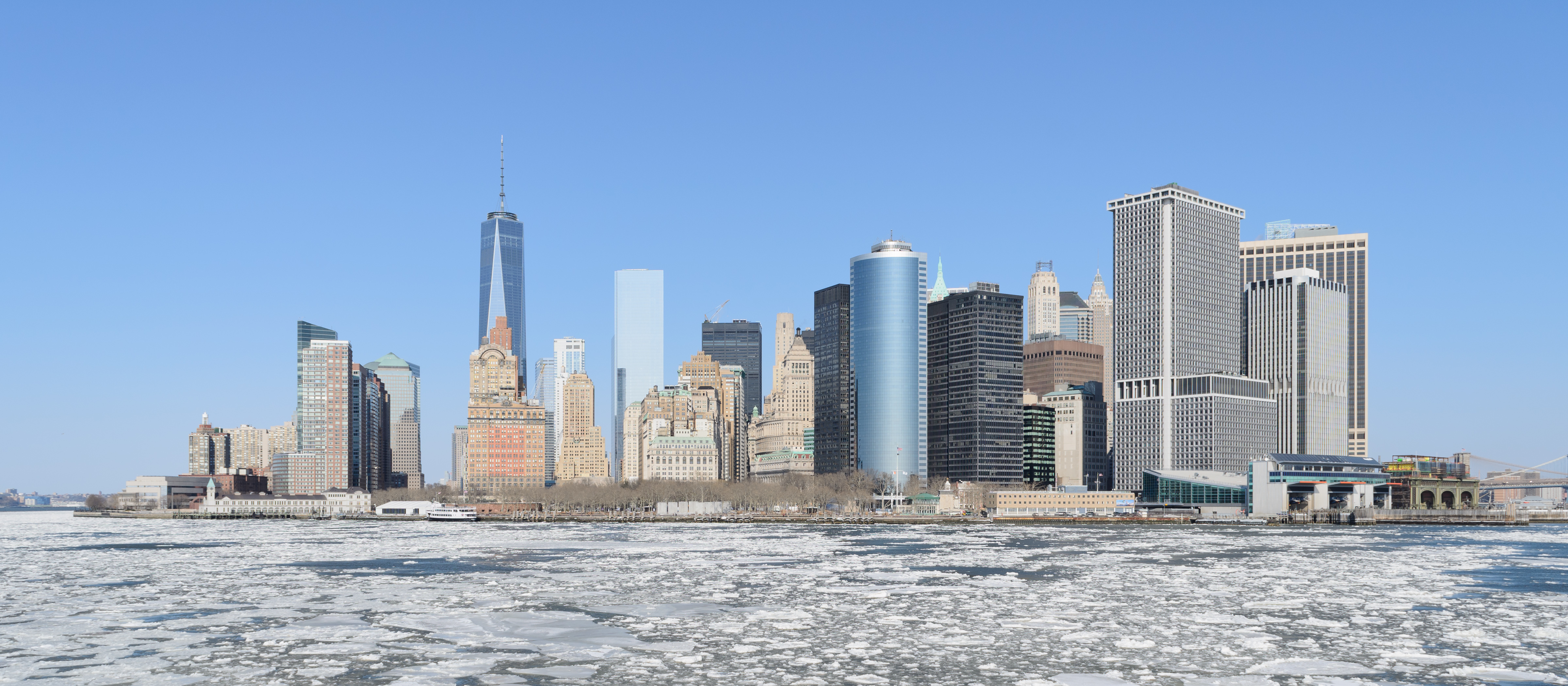
A frozen-over Hudson River in New York City

The average February temperature in Syracuse, New York, was 16.7 °F (9.3 °C) degrees below normal at 9.1 °F (−12.7 °C), breaking by 3 degrees the record set in February 1934. They saw a record 25 days below 0 °F (−18 °C). Ithaca, New York also had its coldest month in record keeping with an average temperature of 10.6 °F (−11.9 °C). While New York City didn't have its coldest February on record, the average temperature of 23.9 °F (−4.5 °C) was still its 3rd coldest. Only one day, February 20, set daily records for cold, at 2 °F (−17 °C). However, one of the NWS New York reporting sites, Islip, did see their coldest month on record, with a mean temperature of 21.4 °F (−5.9 °C). JFK International Airport realized its coldest February and second coldest month on record as well, with a temperature of 24.6 °F (−4.1 °C). However, records don't go back as far as they do in Central Park.

The average temperature in Buffalo, New York, set a record in February for its all-time coldest month with an average temperature of 10.9 °F (−11.7 °C). breaking the prior record set in 1934 of 11.6 °F (−11.3 °C). Before that, the previous coldest February was in 1875 with an average temperature of 13.4 °F (−10.3 °C). It was also the second time in history that the entire month of February was below freezing. Other cities that broke cold weather records for February included Cleveland, at 14.3 °F (−9.8 °C), while Chicago tied its February 1875 record at 14.6 °F (−9.7 °C). Rochester, New York, also set a record for coldest month overall.

In February 2015, nine states (Connecticut, Maine, Massachusetts, New Hampshire, New York, Ohio, Pennsylvania and Vermont) had their second coldest February. New York and Vermont had its coldest first quarter on record in 2015. New Jersey also had one of the coldest February's in 2015, and the coldest month since January 1994.

During the cold wave, several intense bursts of Arctic air intruded down the Eastern United States. February 15 became the coldest day in Buffalo in over two decades, with a high of 2 °F (−17 °C) at 12:20 a.m. and a low of −10 °F (−23 °C), leading to a mean temperature of −4 °F (−20 °C). On February 16, Erie, Pennsylvania tied their all time record low of −18 °F (−28 °C). Flint, Michigan set a daily record low and saw the coldest temperature of −21 °F (−29 °C). On February 18, Mount LeConte hit a record low of −23 °F (−31 °C), although unofficial records dictate a colder temperature in 1985. An arctic blast on February 20 was even more intense. Lynchburg, Virginia set an all time record low of −11 °F (−24 °C), Flint, Michigan tied a record low of −25 °F (−32 °C), and Jamestown, New York set an all time record low of −31 °F (−35 °C). Several cities in Ohio, such as Toledo, Youngstown and Cleveland set or tie monthly record lows. A temperature of −31 °F (−35 °C) in Kentucky tied the states monthly record low. Even Key West, Florida reached 49 °F (9 °C), setting a daily record low. Crestview, further north in the state, reached 19 °F (−7 °C). Parts of Michigan, at −39 °F (−39 °C), were only 5°F (3°C) warmer than the North Pole. In the second cold snap, a man was found dead in Coney Island. In addition, ice on the Hudson River forced several Circle Line boat tours to be cancelled.

=== Canada ===
Toronto recorded its coldest month on record in February with −12.6 °C (9.3 °F) at Pearson Airport, tying with February 1875 (recorded in downtown) and beating the previous record of −12.4 °C (9.7 °F) set in January 1994. In Ottawa, the average temperature was even lower, at −16.8 °C (1.8 °F), which also set a February record. Sarnia set a record for their coldest month ever, at −12.0 °C (10.4 °F). Further west, Thunder Bay recorded their coldest February on record, with a mean temperature of −19.6 °C (−3.3 °F).

In Quebec, Montreal experienced its coldest February on record with an extended cold spell and an average temperature of −15.0 °C (5.0 °F). The province of Quebec as a whole averaged −15.3 °C (4.5 °F), making it the coldest February in provincial history. Some cities fared especially poorly, such as Quebec City, which realized an average temperature of only −17.8 °C (0.0 °F).

== Related weather ==
Most of the northern half of the United States and most of Canada saw several winter storms impact them; each of them had somewhat unique traits. At the start of the month, a major snowstorm was moving across the country, having previously brought blizzard conditions to the Midwest, especially in Chicago, Illinois, where more than a foot of snow was recorded. This storm continued to dump large amounts of snow as it progressed into the Northeast and New England, before finally exiting offshore.

Less than a week later, another winter storm struck New England, with up to nearly 2 feet (24 in) of snow recorded in Boston, Massachusetts over a period of two days. This was the beginning of a three-week streak of winter storms that would progress into the Northeast (with the expectation of one system which went further south). These winter storms caused $1 billion in losses to Massachusetts alone. The 110 inch season was Boston's highest on record. The snowmelt pile in the Seaport district didn't finish melting until July 14.

Around the middle of the month, near Valentine's Day, a powerful blizzard struck the Northeast again, bringing strong winds and more heavy snowfall. After, as the storm exited, it ushered in the coldest air to impact the Northeast in decades, with temperatures dipping as far as 30–40 °F (17–22 °C) below average. Several places broke record lows for February, and temperatures even dipped below 0 °F (−18 °C) in a good part of the Northeast.

Several more winter storms followed afterward, but one of the more notable ones was the one that occurred from February 25–26. This particular storm took an unusual track into the Southeastern United States as the jet stream along with the polar vortex pushed even further southward, resulting in heavy snowfall in states that rarely see it at all, this included Mississippi, Alabama, Georgia, and the Carolinas. Up to 18 inches (46 cm) fell in the hardest hit areas, which was in North Carolina and Virginia.

Due to the cold wave, February 2015 saw only two tornadoes. In addition, Great Lakes ice extent reached its 3rd highest on record.

== See also ==
- Great Blizzard of 1899
- 1994 North American cold wave
- Early 2014 North American cold wave
- 2014–15 North American winter § Late February–early March winter storms
- January 31 – February 2, 2015 North American blizzard
- Mid-February 2015 North American blizzard
- February 2021 North American cold wave
- December 2022 North American winter storm
