= 1985 North American cold wave =

Meteorological event

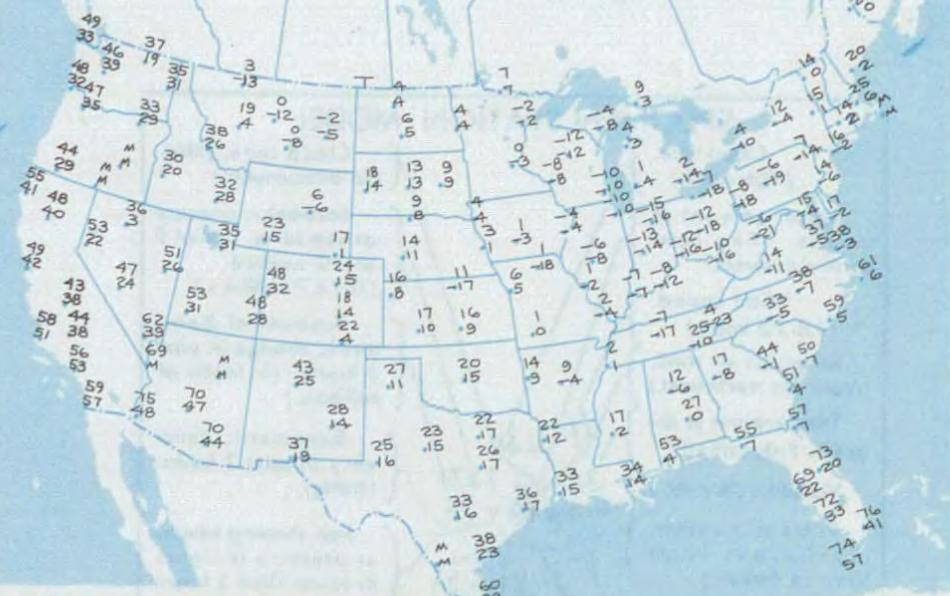
A map of the United States detailing the record-low temperatures for various cities on January 21, 1985

The 1985 North American cold wave was a meteorological event which occurred in January 1985 as a result of the shifting of the polar vortex farther south than is normally seen. Blocked from its normal movement, polar air from the north pushed into nearly every section of the central and eastern half of the United States and Canada, shattering record low temperature records in a number of areas. This was preceded by unusually warm weather in the eastern U.S. in December 1984, suggesting that there was a build-up of cold air that was suddenly released from the Arctic, a meteorological event known as a mobile polar high. Mount Mitchell, in North Carolina recorded an all time record low of −34 °F (−37 °C).

== Meteorological synopsis ==
From Sunday, January 20, 1985, until Tuesday, January 22, 1985, the polar vortex, coupled with a large ridge of high pressure, moved polar air into the United States as far south as Arizona, Texas, and northern Florida. Unlike with cold-air systems, a pattern of self-modification did not immediately occur, and seasonable temperatures were absent for a number of days, a rarity in forecasting.

The Arctic air mass started moving into the United States on the evening of January 19 and into the morning of January 20, 1985. In Chicago, Illinois, a record low of −27 °F (−33 °C) combined with 25 miles per hour (40 km/h) winds, to produce a wind chill of −60 °F (−51 °C). St. Louis, Missouri saw a low of −18 °F (−28 °C), and Pittsburgh, Pennsylvania had a low of −18 °F (−28 °C), the coldest morning since 1899. In Cincinnati, Ohio, the morning temperature of −21 °F (−29 °C) tied for the fourth-lowest minimum temperature in the city's history, outdone by a cold mass the year before and a blizzard in 1977. Cleveland, Ohio fell to −18 °F (−28 °C), which was at the time a record low. Memphis, Tennessee recorded a low of −4 °F (−20 °C), setting a record low for that day. Virginia's official record low temperature of −30 °F (−34 °C) was also set on this day in Pembroke, Virginia.

As the cold air mass moved southeastward, it modified only slightly, resulting in frigid air for most of the East Coast of the United States starting on the morning of January 21, 1985. New York City's Central Park recorded a low of −2 °F (−19 °C), breaking that date's record. Washington National Airport recorded a low of −4 °F (−20 °C) and Washington Dulles Airport a low of −6 °F (−21 °C) on the morning of January 21. Farther south, Roanoke, Virginia, set a record low of −11 °F (−24 °C). Nashville, Tennessee dropped to −17 °F (−27 °C), and Knoxville, Tennessee recorded a record low of −24 °F (−31 °C). All-time low temperature records were also set well into interior sections of the deep South, such as in Charlotte, North Carolina, where temperatures were recorded as low as −5 °F (−21 °C); Macon, Georgia, with a record low of −6 °F (−21 °C); and Jacksonville, Florida with a record low of 7 °F (−14 °C). Gainesville, Florida, with a low temperature of 10 °F (−12 °C) was its coldest temperature since the Great Blizzard of 1899 (when it had reached a low of 6 °F (−14 °C)). Atlanta, Georgia saw a low of −8 °F (−22 °C), setting a record for the month of January as well as for the 20th century, and was only one degree shy of its all-time record (since 1878) set in February 1899. Miami, Florida, whose average low in late January is 61 °F (16 °C), recorded a record low of 37 °F (3 °C) on January 21, 1985, and 34 °F (1 °C) on January 22, 1985. The high temperature at Miami Beach on January 22 was only 56 °F (13 °C), which was 18 °F (10 °C) below normal.

== Impact and aftermath ==
The cold wave of January 1985 resulted in at least 126 human fatalities, the deaths of many wild and domesticated animals, massive crop losses, and widespread infrastructure damage. Approximately 90% of the citrus crops in Florida were destroyed in what the state called the "Freeze of the Century," resulting in Florida's citrus industry suffering $1.2 billion in losses ($2.68 billion in 2016 dollars).

The second presidential inauguration of U.S. President Ronald Reagan was held in the United States Capitol Rotunda instead of outside, due to the cold weather, and the inaugural parade was cancelled. Since Inauguration Day fell on a Sunday, Ronald Reagan took a private oath on January 20, 1985, and the semi-public oath on January 21, 1985.
