= Sudden stratospheric warming =

Meteorological phenomenon

Sudden stratospheric warming (SSW) is an atmospheric phenomenon that occurs when polar stratospheric temperatures suddenly rise by several degrees (sometimes as much as 50 °C (90 °F)) over the course of a few days. SSW's occur high in the stratosphere, are often associated with Rossby waves and Polar Vortex breakdown and come in varying magnitudes. SSW events are significantly more common in the northern hemisphere than the southern hemisphere.

== History ==
SSW's were discovered by Richard Scherhag, a German Meteorologist who worked at the Free University of Berlin. Starting in 1951, Scherhag launched radiosondes from Berlin's Tempelhof Airport to research temperature behavior in the upper stratosphere. However, on January 26th, 1952, Scherhag noticed that the upper stratosphere was beginning to warm at an abnormal rate. The warming continued for four days, by which time the upper stratosphere had warmed 33 °C. Scherhag reported this phenomenon in a journal later that year, expressing considerable uncertainty regarding its cause and nature.

Throughout the 1950s, radiosonde coverage improved substantially worldwide, allowing major meteorological organizations all over the world to analyze the stratosphere for the first time. This improvement in coverage detected similar SSWs in 1957 and 1958, making SSWs a focus for research groups of the time. Over the next decade, these groups discovered several characteristics of and raised awareness for SSWs, leading the World Meteorological Organization to establish of the STRATWARM warning system, which launched more soundings and issued alerts on the magnitude and location of SSW events, in 1964. These groups also began to classifying SSW events based on their time of occurrence and overall magnitude, leading to the classification categories that most scientists use today.

SSW documentation and understanding has improved substantially since the modern satellite era began in 1979. Modern satellites make stratospheric measurements with accuracy and consistency that radiosondes never could, allowing for the creation of an SSW database and breakthroughs in SSW research. The WMO also developed STRATALERT, an international stratospheric monitoring program that monitors stratospheric conditions and documents SSW events.

== Classification and description ==
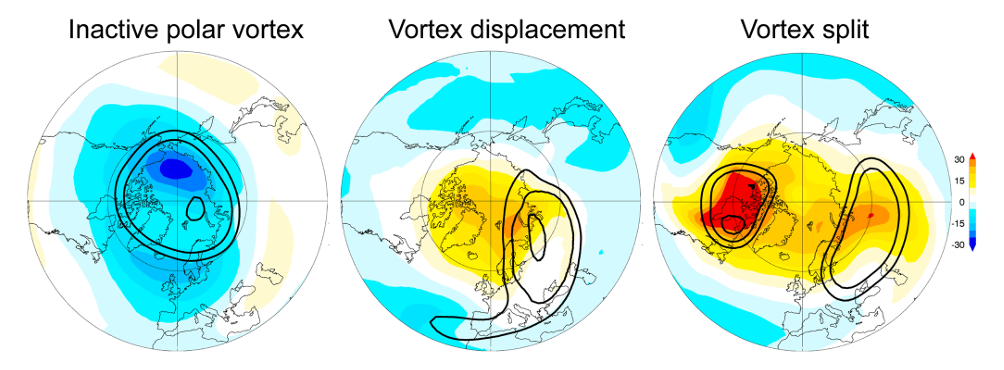
This MERRA-2 Reanalysis Plot shows how Sudden Stratospheric Warming (SSW) can affect polar vortexes.

SSW events are categorized by a sudden and abrupt increase in stratospheric temperatures over a short period of time, usually within a few days. SSW events occur in the winter, when winds in the stratosphere are normally westerly. SSW events disrupt the normal westerly wind flow of the upper troposphere, and, depending on severity, can sometimes reverse it entirely. As a result, some of the warmed air can intrude into the troposphere, which often disrupts the Polar Vortex. SSW events usually affect polar areas only, although the strongest SSW events can come down to 60 degrees north. Almost all SSW events take place in the northern hemisphere, which normally sees one SSW every 2-3 years. There was one major SSW event in the southern hemisphere in 2002, but no other major SSW events have been detected in the southern hemisphere since then.

Because SSWs come in all magnitudes and sizes, it has led meteorologists to classify SSW events in two main categories: major and minor, based on how much they change temperature patterns and disrupt the polar vortex circulation. Sometimes, if an SSW event permanently reverses stratospheric winds to the east, which is the typical stratospheric wind flow for the summer, it is called a final warming.

=== Major ===
A major SSW event is the strongest type of SSW event. These events are usually strong enough to entirely reverse the westerly flow that is common in the stratosphere during winter. These events influence temperatures as far south as 60 degrees north and are usually strong enough to completely disrupt the polar vortex, often splitting it into smaller vortices or displacing it entirely from its normal location. In order to qualify as a major SSW event, the event must completely reverse the westerly flow and come down to 60 degrees north.

=== Minor ===
A minor SSW event is the weaker type of SSW event. These events are usually not strong enough to entirely reverse the westerly flow that is common in the stratosphere during winter, but instead add a noticeable easterly component to the westerly flow. Minor SSW events are usually not strong enough to break down the polar vortex and affect temperatures as far south as 60 degrees N.

=== Final ===
A final SSW event is any SSW event that permanently reverses the stratospheric wind flow from westerly to easterly for the summer. Normally, stratospheric winds are westerly in the winter and easterly in the summer, so any late-winter SSW event that permanently causes this is called a final warming. Final warmings are usually major SSW events.

== Dynamics ==
SSW events are often associated with strong Rossby wave events in the troposphere, which can intrude into the stratosphere if they become strong enough. Strong Rossby waves are usually associated with strong systems and temperature gradients, so it is common to see SSW events associated with particularly strong areas of low pressure. The resultant intrusion of warm, tropospheric air into the stratosphere has a dramatic effect on normal winter stratospheric wind patterns, changing the westerly winds and warming the aloft stratospheric temperatures, disrupting the polar vortex. This is a big reason why SSW events are far more common in the northern hemisphere. Because the northern hemisphere has much more land than the southern hemisphere does, the sharp temperature gradients that induce strong Rossby wave activity seldom exist.

Strong Rossby wave events are often associated with a meteorological blocking pattern, which causes the waves to grow large enough to protrude into the stratosphere. The magnitude of the Rossby wave has significant influence over the strength of the SSW event. However, if the main stratospheric flow turns easterly, it prevents the Rossby wave from continuing its stratospheric intrusion. This blockage releases substantial amounts of energy that force the polar vortex to collapse, which explains why most polar-vortex collapses are major SSW events.

A correlation exists between SSW events and the quasi-biennial oscillation (QBO). If the QBO is in its easterly phase, the atmospheric waveguide is set up in a way that causes upward-propagating Rossby waves to focus more on the polar vortex. This helps intensify their interaction with the mean flow, thus boosting the probability of an SSW event occurring.

== Weather and climate effects ==
Even though SSW events mainly affect the stratosphere, they have a notable influence on surface weather and climate. For example, SSW events often cause normal tropospheric westerly winds to weaken, which can cause temperature drops in mid-latitude regions of the northern hemisphere. The surface response to a sudden stratospheric warming does not result from stratospheric cold air simply descending to the ground. Instead, changes in the stratospheric circulation can propagate downward and alter tropospheric pressure patterns, the polar jet stream, and atmospheric blocking. These circulation changes may then allow existing Arctic air masses in the lower atmosphere to move farther into the mid-latitudes. The surface response is neither immediate nor guaranteed; it can develop over days or weeks, and some sudden stratospheric warming events produce little or no significant cold outbreak in a particular region.

The resultant cold air intrusions can create blocking patterns and sharper temperature gradients, which can push extratropical cyclone storm tracks closer to the equator. This change often causes more precipitation to be seen in mid-latitude regions, while high-latitude areas often remain dry. The resultant blocking patterns and gradients can also cause an increase in extratropical cyclone intensity, increasing the potential for damaging straight-line wind events.

== See also ==
- Polar amplification
- Teleconnection
- Polar vortex
