= Polar vortex =

Persistent cold-core low-pressure area that circles one of the poles

The Arctic tropospheric polar vortex

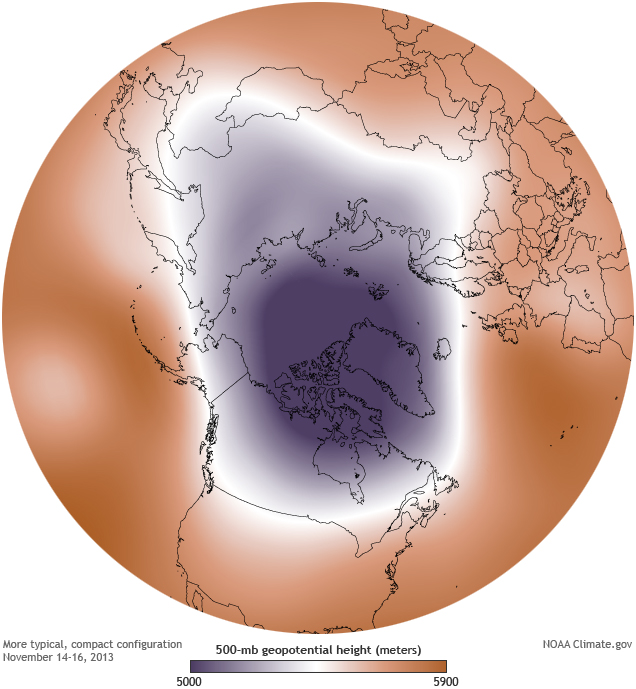
A strong tropospheric polar vortex configuration in November 2013

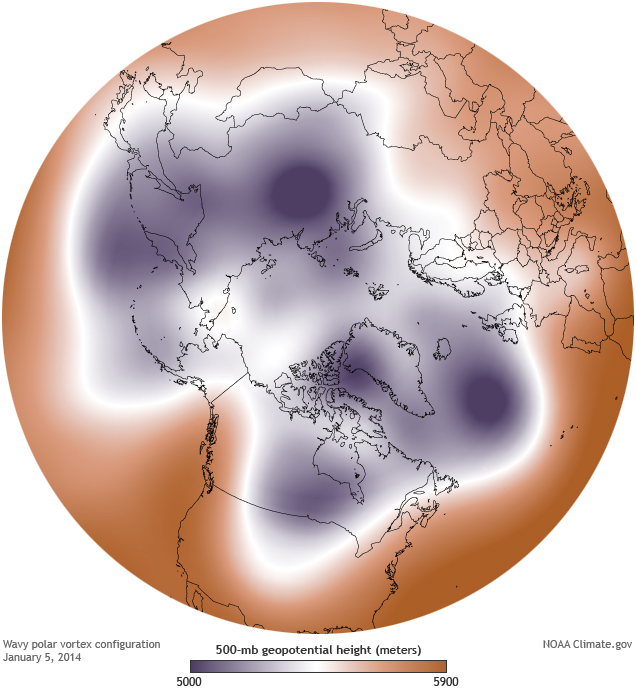
A more typical weak tropospheric polar vortex on January 5, 2014

A polar vortex, more formally a circumpolar vortex, is a large region of cold, rotating air; polar vortices encircle both of Earth's polar regions. Polar vortices also exist on other rotating, low-obliquity planetary bodies. The term polar vortex can be used to describe two distinct phenomena; the stratospheric polar vortex, and the tropospheric polar vortex. The stratospheric and tropospheric polar vortices both rotate in the direction of the Earth's spin, but they are distinct phenomena that have different sizes, structures, seasonal cycles, and impacts on weather.

The stratospheric polar vortex is an area of high-speed, cyclonically rotating winds around 15 to 50 kilometres (10 to 30 mi) high, poleward of 50°, and is strongest in winter. It forms during autumn when Arctic or Antarctic temperatures cool rapidly as the polar night begins. The increased temperature difference between the pole and the tropics causes strong winds, and the Coriolis effect causes the vortex to spin up. The stratospheric polar vortex breaks down during spring as the polar night ends. A sudden stratospheric warming (SSW) is an event that occurs when the stratospheric vortex breaks down during winter, and can have significant impacts on surface weather.

The tropospheric polar vortex is often defined as the area poleward of the tropospheric jet stream. The equatorward edge is around 40° to 50°, and it extends from the surface up to around 10 to 15 km (6 to 9 mi). Its yearly cycle differs from the stratospheric vortex because the tropospheric vortex exists all year, but is similar to the stratospheric vortex since it is also strongest in winter when the polar regions are coldest.

The tropospheric polar vortex was first described as early as 1853. The stratospheric vortex's SSWs were discovered in 1952 with radiosonde observations at altitudes higher than 20 km (12 mi). The tropospheric polar vortex was mentioned frequently in the news and weather media in the cold North American winter of 2013–2014, popularizing the term as an explanation of very cold temperatures. The tropospheric vortex increased in public visibility in 2021 as a result of extreme frigid temperatures in the central United States, with newspapers linking its effects to climate change.

Ozone depletion occurs most heavily within the polar vortices – particularly over the Southern Hemisphere – reaching a maximum depletion in the spring.

== Arctic and Antarctic vortices ==
=== Northern Hemisphere ===
When the tropospheric vortex of the Arctic is strong, it has a well defined and nearly circular shape. There is a single vortex with a jet stream that is well constrained near the polar front, and the Arctic air is well contained. When this northern tropospheric vortex weakens, it breaks into two or more smaller vortices, the strongest of which are near Baffin Island, Nunavut, and the others over northeast Siberia. When it is very weak, the flow of Arctic air becomes more disorganized, and masses of cold Arctic air can push equatorward, bringing with them a rapid and sharp temperature drop.

A deep freeze that gripped much of the United States and Canada in late January 2019 was blamed in some accounts on a "polar vortex". This is not the scientifically correct use of the term polar vortex, but instead is referring to outbreaks of cold Arctic air caused by a weakened polar vortex. The US National Weather Service warned that frostbite is possible within just 10 minutes of being outside in such extreme temperatures, and hundreds of schools, colleges, and universities in the affected areas were closed. Around 21 people died in US due to severe frostbite. States within the midwest region of the United States had windchills just above -50 °F (-45 °C). The polar vortex is also thought to have had effects in Europe. For example, the 2013–14 United Kingdom winter floods were blamed on the polar vortex bringing severe cold in the United States and Canada. Similarly, the severe cold in the United Kingdom in the winters of 2009–10 and 2010–11 were also blamed on the polar vortex.

=== Southern Hemisphere ===
The Antarctic vortex of the Southern Hemisphere is a single low-pressure zone that is found near the edge of the Ross Ice Shelf, near 160 west longitude. When the polar vortex is strong, the mid-latitude Westerlies (winds at the surface level between 30° and 60° latitude from the west) increase in strength and are persistent. When the polar vortex is weak, high-pressure zones of the mid-latitudes may push poleward, moving the polar vortex, jet stream, and polar front equatorward. The jet stream is seen to "buckle" and deviate south. This rapidly brings cold dry air into contact with the warm, moist air of the mid-latitudes, resulting in a rapid and dramatic change of weather known as a "cold snap".

In Australia, the polar vortex, known there as a "polar blast" or "polar plunge", is a cold front that drags air from Antarctica which brings rain showers, snow (typically inland, with blizzards occurring in the highlands), gusty icy winds, and hail in the south-eastern parts of the country, such as in Victoria, Tasmania, the southeast coast of South Australia and the southern half of New South Wales (but only on the windward side of the Great Dividing Range, whereas the leeward side will be affected by foehn winds).

== Identification ==
The bases of the two polar vortices are located in the middle and upper troposphere and extend into the stratosphere. Beneath that lies a large mass of cold, dense Arctic air. The interface between the cold dry air mass of the pole and the warm moist air mass farther south defines the location of the polar front. The polar front is centered roughly at 60° latitude. A polar vortex strengthens in the winter and weakens in the summer because of its dependence on the temperature difference between the equator and the poles.

Polar cyclones are low-pressure zones embedded within the polar air masses, and exist year-round. The stratospheric polar vortex develops at latitudes above the subtropical jet stream. Horizontally, most polar vortices have a radius of less than 1,000 kilometres (620 mi). Since polar vortices exist from the stratosphere downward into the mid-troposphere, a variety of heights/pressure levels are used to mark its position. The 50-hectopascal (0.73 psi) pressure surface is most often used to identify its stratospheric location. At the level of the tropopause, the extent of closed contours of potential temperature can be used to determine its strength. Others have used levels down to the 500 hPa (7.3 psi) pressure level (about 5,460 metres (17,910 ft) above sea level during the winter) to identify the polar vortex.

== Duration and strength ==
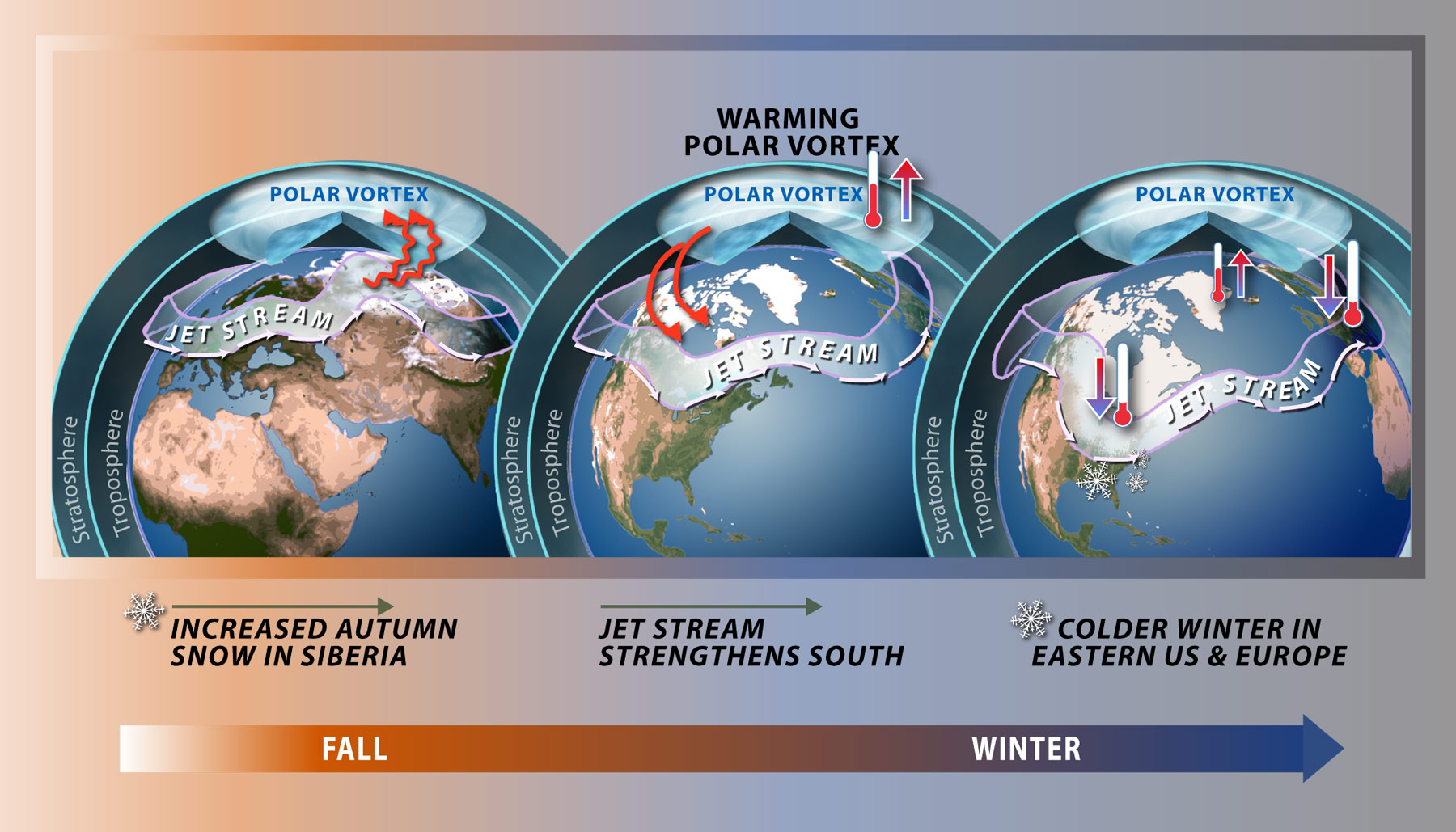
Polar vortex and weather impacts due to stratospheric warming

Polar vortices are weakest during summer and strongest during winter. Extratropical cyclones that migrate into higher latitudes when the polar vortex is weak can disrupt the single vortex creating smaller vortices (cold-core lows) within the polar air mass. Those individual vortices can persist for more than a month.

Volcanic eruptions in the tropics can lead to a stronger polar vortex during winter for as long as two years afterwards. The strength and position of the polar vortex shapes the flow pattern in a broad area about it. An index which is used in the Northern Hemisphere to gauge its magnitude is the Arctic oscillation.

When the Arctic vortex is at its strongest, there is a single vortex, but normally, the Arctic vortex is elongated in shape, with two cyclone centers, one over Baffin Island in Canada and the other over northeast Siberia. When the Arctic pattern is at its weakest, subtropic air masses can intrude poleward causing the Arctic air masses to move equatorward, as during the Winter 1985 Arctic outbreak. The Antarctic polar vortex is more pronounced and persistent than the Arctic one. In the Arctic the distribution of land masses at high latitudes in the Northern Hemisphere gives rise to Rossby waves which contribute to the breakdown of the polar vortex, whereas in the Southern Hemisphere the vortex is less disturbed. The breakdown of the polar vortex is an extreme event known as a sudden stratospheric warming, here the vortex completely breaks down and an associated warming of 30–50 °C (54–90 °F) over a few days can occur.

The waxing and waning of the polar vortex is driven by the movement of mass and the transfer of heat in the polar region. In the autumn, the circumpolar winds increase in speed and the polar vortex rises into the stratosphere. The result is that the polar air forms a coherent rotating air mass: the polar vortex. As winter approaches, the vortex core cools, the winds decrease, and the vortex energy declines. Once late winter and early spring approach the vortex is at its weakest. As a result, during late winter, large fragments of the vortex air can be diverted into lower latitudes by stronger weather systems intruding from those latitudes. In the lowest level of the stratosphere, strong potential vorticity gradients remain, and the majority of that air remains confined within the polar air mass into December in the Southern Hemisphere and April in the Northern Hemisphere, well after the breakup of the vortex in the mid-stratosphere.

The breakup of the northern polar vortex occurs between mid March to mid May. This event signifies the transition from winter to spring, and has impacts on the hydrological cycle, growing seasons of vegetation, and overall ecosystem productivity. The timing of the transition also influences changes in sea ice, ozone, air temperature, and cloudiness. Early and late polar breakup episodes have occurred, due to variations in the stratospheric flow structure and upward spreading of planetary waves from the troposphere. As a result of increased waves into the vortex, the vortex experiences more rapid warming than normal, resulting in an earlier breakup and spring. When the breakup comes early, it is characterized by with persistent of remnants of the vortex. When the breakup is late, the remnants dissipate rapidly. When the breakup is early, there is one warming period from late February to middle March. When the breakup is late, there are two warming periods, one January, and one in March. Zonal mean temperature, wind, and geopotential height exert varying deviations from their normal values before and after early breakups, while the deviations remain constant before and after late breakups. Scientists are connecting a delay in the Arctic vortex breakup with a reduction of planetary wave activities, few stratospheric sudden warming events, and depletion of ozone.

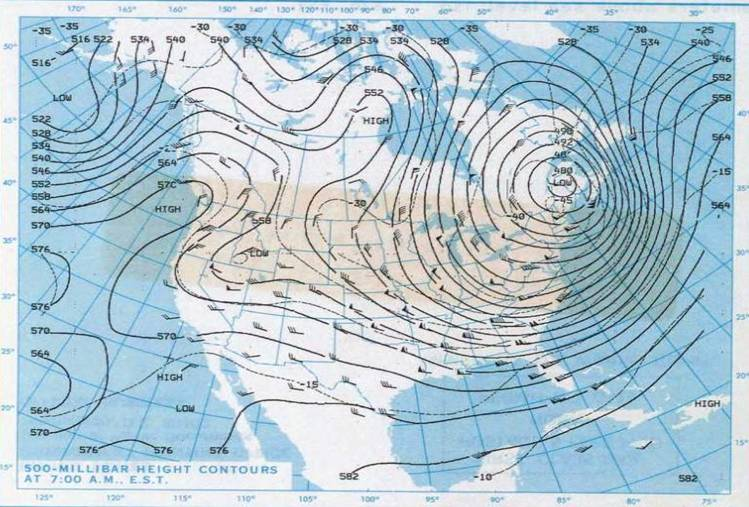
Low pressure area over Quebec, Maine, and New Brunswick, part of the northern polar vortex weakening, on the record-setting cold morning of January 21, 1985

Sudden stratospheric warming events are associated with weaker polar vortices. This warming of stratospheric air can reverse the circulation in the Arctic Polar Vortex from counter-clockwise to clockwise. These changes aloft force changes in the troposphere below. An example of an effect on the troposphere is the change in speed of the Atlantic Ocean circulation pattern. A soft spot just south of Greenland is where the initial step of downwelling occurs, nicknamed the "Achilles Heel of the North Atlantic". Small amounts of heating or cooling traveling from the polar vortex can trigger or delay downwelling, altering the Gulf Stream Current of the Atlantic, and the speed of other ocean currents. Since all other oceans depend on the Atlantic Ocean's movement of heat energy, climates across the planet can be dramatically affected. The weakening or strengthening of the polar vortex can alter the sea circulation more than a mile beneath the waves. Strengthening storm systems within the troposphere that cool the poles, intensify the polar vortex. La Niña–related climate anomalies significantly strengthen the polar vortex. Intensification of the polar vortex produces changes in relative humidity as downward intrusions of dry, stratospheric air enter the vortex core. With a strengthening of the vortex comes a longwave cooling due to a decrease in water vapor concentration near the vortex. The decreased water content is a result of a lower tropopause within the vortex, which places dry stratospheric air above moist tropospheric air. Instability is caused when the vortex tube, the line of concentrated vorticity, is displaced. When this occurs, the vortex rings become more unstable and prone to shifting by planetary waves. The planetary wave activity in both hemispheres varies year-to-year, producing a corresponding response in the strength and temperature of the polar vortex. The number of waves around the perimeter of the vortex are related to the core size; as the vortex core decreases, the number of waves increase.

The degree of the mixing of polar and mid-latitude air depends on the evolution and position of the polar night jet. In general, the mixing is less inside the vortex than outside. Mixing occurs with unstable planetary waves that are characteristic of the middle and upper stratosphere in winter. Prior to vortex breakdown, there is little transport of air out of the Arctic Polar Vortex due to strong barriers above 420 km (261 miles). The polar night jet which exists below this, is weak in the early winter. As a result, it does not deviate any descending polar air, which then mixes with air in the mid-latitudes. In the late winter, air parcels do not descend as much, reducing mixing. After the vortex is broken up, the ex-vortex air is dispersed into the middle latitudes within a month.

Sometimes, a mass of the polar vortex breaks off before the end of the final warming period. If large enough, the piece can move into Canada and the Midwestern, Central, Southern, and Northeastern United States. This diversion of the polar vortex can occur due to the displacement of the polar jet stream; for example, the significant northwestward direction of the polar jet stream in the western part of the United States during the winters of 2013–2014, and 2014–2015. This caused warm, dry conditions in the west, and cold, snowy conditions in the north-central and northeast. Occasionally, the high-pressure air mass, called the Greenland Block, can cause the polar vortex to divert to the south, rather than follow its normal path over the North Atlantic.

== Extreme weather ==
A study in 2001 found that stratospheric circulation can have anomalous effects on weather regimes. In the same year, researchers found a statistical correlation between weak polar vortex and outbreaks of severe cold in the Northern Hemisphere. In later years, scientists identified interactions with Arctic sea ice decline, reduced snow cover, evapotranspiration patterns, NAO anomalies or weather anomalies which are linked to the polar vortex and jet stream configuration.

=== Climate change ===
Since the early 2000s, climate models have consistently identified that global warming will gradually push jet streams poleward. In 2008, this was confirmed by observational evidence, which proved that from 1979 to 2001, the northern jet stream moved northward at an average rate of 2.01 kilometres (1.25 mi) per year, with a similar trend in the southern hemisphere jet stream. Climate scientists have hypothesized that the jet stream will also gradually weaken as a result of global warming. Trends such as Arctic sea ice decline, reduced snow cover, evapotranspiration patterns, and other weather anomalies have caused the Arctic to heat up faster than other parts of the globe, in what is known as the Arctic amplification. In 2021–2022, it was found that since 1979, the warming within the Arctic Circle has been nearly four times faster than the global average, and some hotspots in the Barents Sea area warmed up to seven times faster than the global average. While the Arctic remains one of the coldest places on Earth today, the temperature gradient between it and the warmer parts of the globe will continue to diminish with every decade of global warming as the result of this amplification. If this gradient has a strong influence on the jet stream, then it will eventually become weaker and more variable in its course, which would allow more cold air from the polar vortex to leak mid-latitudes and slow the progression of Rossby waves, leading to more persistent and more extreme weather.

The hypothesis above is closely associated with Jennifer Francis, who had first proposed it in a 2012 paper co-authored by Stephen J. Vavrus. While some paleoclimate reconstructions have suggested that the polar vortex becomes more variable and causes more unstable weather during periods of warming back in 1997, this was contradicted by climate modelling, with PMIP2 simulations finding in 2010 that the Arctic Oscillation (AO) was much weaker and more negative during the Last Glacial Maximum, and suggesting that warmer periods have stronger positive phase AO, and thus less frequent leaks of the polar vortex air. However, a 2012 review in the Journal of the Atmospheric Sciences noted that "there [has been] a significant change in the vortex mean state over the twenty-first century, resulting in a weaker, more disturbed vortex.", which contradicted the modelling results but fit the Francis-Vavrus hypothesis. Additionally, a 2013 study noted that the then-current CMIP5 tended to strongly underestimate winter blocking trends, and other 2012 research had suggested a connection between declining Arctic sea ice and heavy snowfall during midlatitude winters.

In 2013, further research from Francis connected reductions in the Arctic sea ice to extreme summer weather in the northern mid-latitudes, while other research from that year identified potential linkages between Arctic sea ice trends and more extreme rainfall in the European summer. At the time, it was also suggested that this connection between Arctic amplification and jet stream patterns was involved in the formation of Hurricane Sandy and played a role in the early 2014 North American cold wave. In 2015, Francis' next study concluded that highly amplified jet-stream patterns are occurring more frequently in the past two decades. Hence, continued heat-trapping emissions favour increased formation of extreme events caused by prolonged weather conditions.

Studies published in 2017 and 2018 identified stalling patterns of Rossby waves in the Northern Hemisphere jet stream as the culprit behind other almost stationary extreme weather events, such as the 2018 European heatwave, the 2003 European heat wave, 2010 Russian heat wave or the 2010 Pakistan floods, and suggested that these patterns were all connected to Arctic amplification. Further work from Francis and Vavrus that year suggested that amplified Arctic warming is observed as stronger in lower atmospheric areas because the expanding process of warmer air increases pressure levels which decreases poleward geopotential height gradients. As these gradients are the reason that cause west to east winds through the thermal wind relationship, declining speeds are usually found south of the areas with geopotential increases. In 2017, Francis explained her findings to the Scientific American: "A lot more water vapor is being transported northward by big swings in the jet stream. That's important because water vapor is a greenhouse gas just like carbon dioxide and methane. It traps heat in the atmosphere. That vapor also condenses as droplets we know as clouds, which themselves trap more heat. The vapor is a big part of the amplification story—a big reason the Arctic is warming faster than anywhere else."

In a 2017 study conducted by climatologist Judah Cohen and several of his research associates, Cohen wrote that "[the] shift in polar vortex states can account for most of the recent winter cooling trends over Eurasian midlatitudes". A 2018 paper from Vavrus and others linked Arctic amplification to more persistent hot-dry extremes during the midlatitude summers, as well as the midlatitude winter continental cooling. Another 2017 paper estimated that when the Arctic experiences anomalous warming, primary production in North America goes down by between 1% and 4% on average, with some states suffering up to 20% losses. A 2021 study found that a stratospheric polar vortex disruption is linked with extreme cold winter weather across parts of Asia and North America, including the February 2021 North American cold wave. Another 2021 study identified a connection between the Arctic sea ice loss and the increased size of wildfires in the Western United States.

However, because the specific observations are considered short-term observations, there is considerable uncertainty in the conclusions. Climatology observations require several decades to definitively distinguish various forms of natural variability from climate trends. This point was stressed by reviews in 2013 and in 2017. A study in 2014 concluded that Arctic amplification significantly decreased cold-season temperature variability over the northern hemisphere in recent decades. Cold Arctic air intrudes into the warmer lower latitudes more rapidly today during autumn and winter, a trend projected to continue in the future except during summer, thus calling into question whether winters will bring more cold extremes. A 2019 analysis of a data set collected from 35 182 weather stations worldwide, including 9116 whose records go beyond 50 years, found a sharp decrease in northern midlatitude cold waves since the 1980s.

Moreover, a range of long-term observational data collected during the 2010s and published in 2020 suggests that the intensification of Arctic amplification since the early 2010s was not linked to significant changes on mid-latitude atmospheric patterns. State-of-the-art modelling research of PAMIP (Polar Amplification Model Intercomparison Project) improved upon the 2010 findings of PMIP2; it found that sea ice decline would weaken the jet stream and increase the probability of atmospheric blocking, but the connection was very minor, and typically insignificant next to interannual variability. In 2022, a follow-up study found that while the PAMIP average had likely underestimated the weakening caused by sea ice decline by 1.2 to 3 times, even the corrected connection still amounts to only 10% of the jet stream's natural variability.

Additionally, a 2021 study found that while jet streams had indeed slowly moved polewards since 1960 as was predicted by models, they did not weaken, in spite of a small increase in waviness. A 2022 re-analysis of the aircraft observational data collected over 2002–2020 suggested that the North Atlantic jet stream had actually strengthened. Finally, a 2021 study was able to reconstruct jet stream patterns over the past 1,250 years based on Greenland ice cores, and found that all of the recently observed changes remain within range of natural variability: the earliest likely time of divergence is in 2060, under the Representative Concentration Pathway 8.5 which implies continually accelerating greenhouse gas emissions.

== Ozone depletion ==
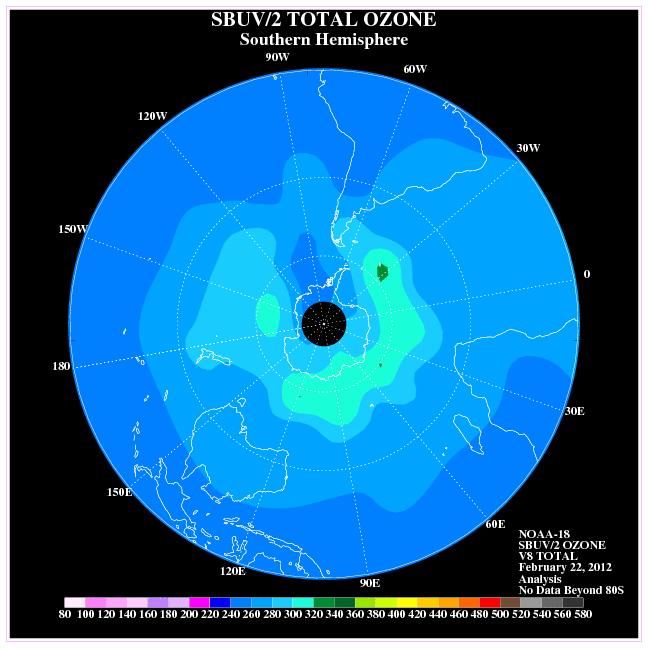
Southern Hemisphere ozone concentration, February 22, 2012

The chemistry of the Antarctic polar vortex has created severe ozone depletion, although the effect has been weakening since the 2000s. It is expected to return to 1980 levels in about 2075. The nitric acid in polar stratospheric clouds reacts with chlorofluorocarbons to form chlorine, which catalyzes the photochemical destruction of ozone. Chlorine concentrations build up during the polar winter, and the consequent ozone destruction is greatest when the sunlight returns in spring. These clouds can only form at temperatures below about −80 °C (−112 °F).

Since there is greater air exchange between the Arctic and the mid-latitudes, ozone depletion at the north pole is much less severe than at the south. Accordingly, the seasonal reduction of ozone levels over the Arctic is usually characterized as an "ozone dent", whereas the more severe ozone depletion over the Antarctic is considered an "ozone hole". That said, chemical ozone destruction in the 2011 Arctic polar vortex attained, for the first time, a level clearly identifiable as an Arctic "ozone hole".

== Outside Earth ==
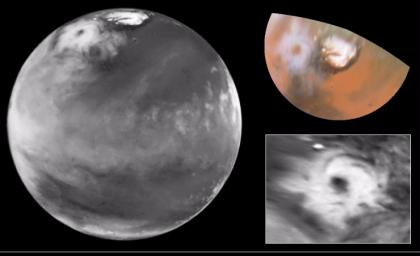
Hubble Space Telescope view of the colossal polar cloud on Mars

Other astronomical bodies are also known to have polar vortices, including Venus (double vortex – that is, two polar vortices at a pole), Mars, Jupiter, Saturn, and Saturn's moon Titan.

Saturn's south pole is the only known hot polar vortex in the Solar System.

== See also ==
- Polar amplification
- Saturn's hexagon – a persisting hexagonal cloud pattern around the north pole of Saturn
- Windward Performance Perlan II – will be used to study the northern polar vortex
- Polar front
- Cut-off low
- Sudden stratospheric warming
