= 2012 Indian cold wave =

Weather event in India

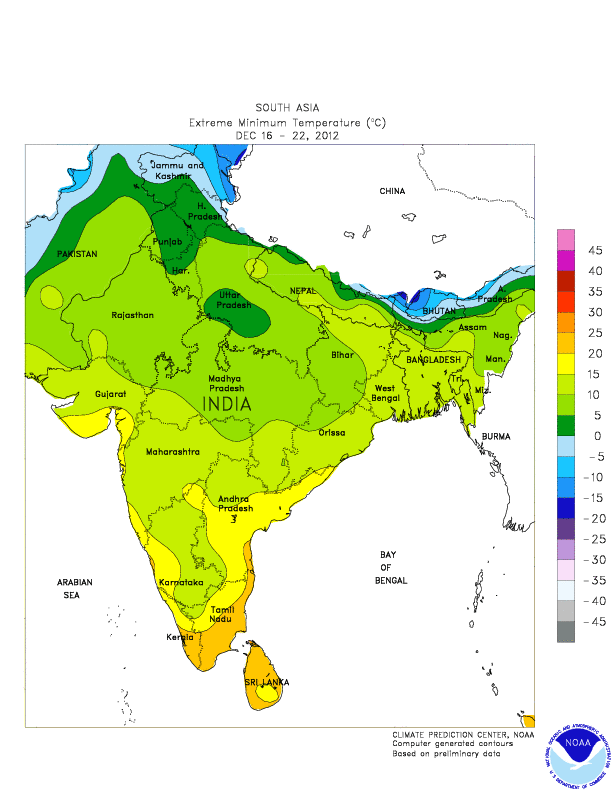
- Extreme minimum temperature 16 to 22 December 2012, computer generated contours, based on preliminary data.

Cold Wave
- Lowest temperature: 1 °C (33.80 °F)

Overall effects
- Fatalities: 92+
- Areas affected: India

Indian cold wave during the winter months of 2012 killed at least 92 people across northern and eastern India. The drop in temperature had a devastating effect on the hundreds of thousands of homeless people in India.

Most of the dead were homeless and elderly people, living in the state of Uttar Pradesh. Other northern and eastern states such as Rajasthan, Punjab, Haryana, New Delhi, Jammu and Kashmir, Himachal Pradesh, Madhya Pradesh, Bihar and Tripura were also affected by this cold snap. New Delhi was also gripped by cold weather, with the temperature dipping to 7 °C on the Christmas Day and 1 °C after New Year.

== See also ==
- Cold wave
- Climate of India
