= 2011 North Indian cold wave =

Weather event in India

North Indian Cold Wave (2011) is the cold snap affected across northern parts of India in the winter of 2011, killing more than 130 people. Uttar Pradesh, Punjab and Haryana were the northern states badly hit by the cooling of the air.

== See also ==
- Cold wave
- Climate of India
