= December 2022 North American blizzard =

North American winter storm in 2022

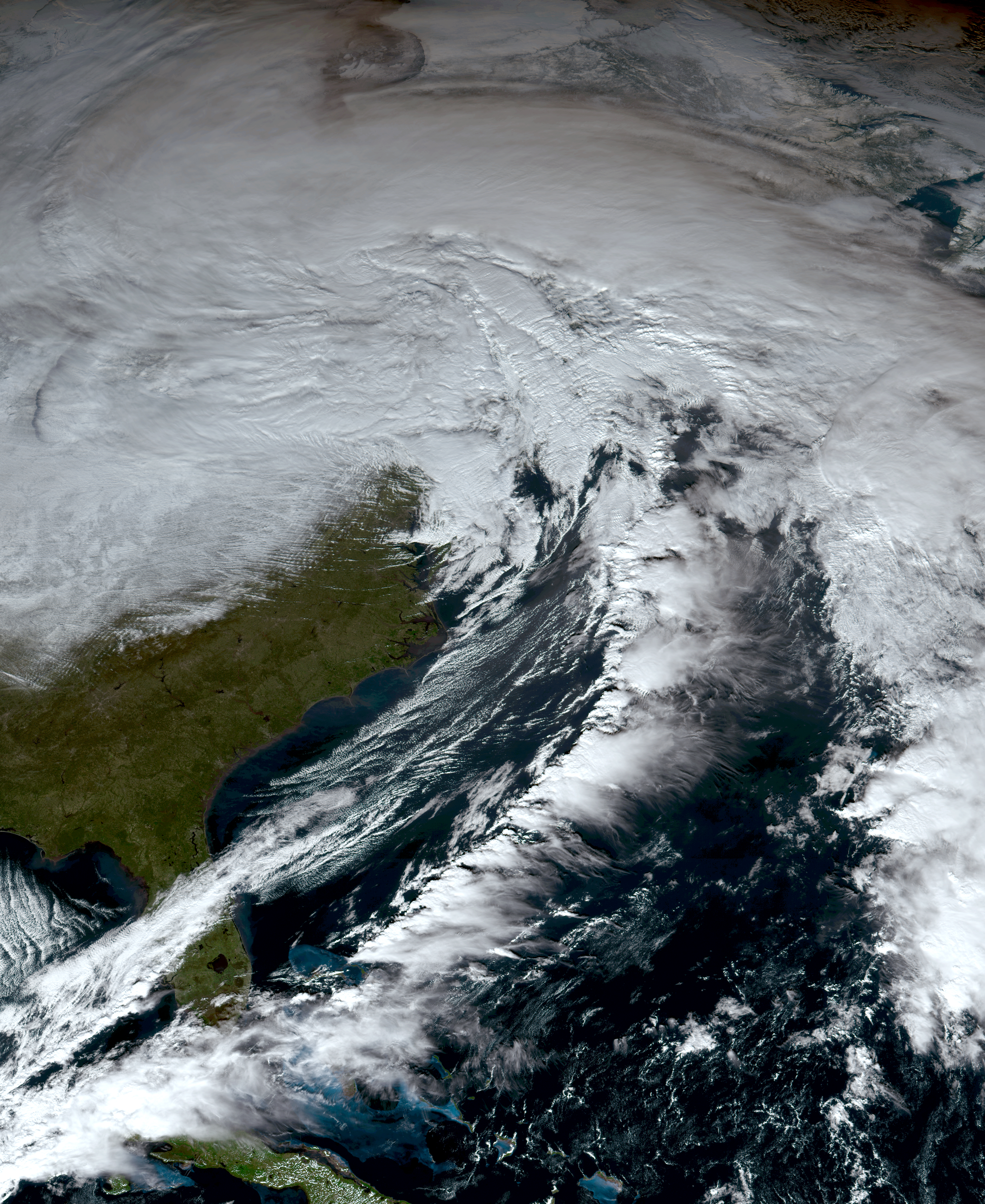
- The storm near peak intensity while over Canada on December 23

Meteorological history
- Formed: December 21, 2022
- Dissipated: December 26, 2022

Category 4 "Crippling" blizzard
- Regional snowfall index: 11.50 (NOAA)
- Highest gusts: 79 mph (127 km/h) in Lackawanna, New York, U.S.; 151 mph (243 km/h) above treeline on Mount Washington in New Hampshire
- Lowest pressure: 963 mbar (hPa); 28.44 inHg
- Max. snowfall: 56.5 in (144 cm) in Snyder, New York, U.S.

Overall effects
- Fatalities: 106 (Note: Includes 6 from Pacific Northwest storm; in total, deaths occurred across 20 U.S. states and two Canadian provinces)
- Damage: $8.5 billion (2022 USD)
- Areas affected: Pacific Northwest, Eastern United States, Canada, Newfoundland
- Power outages: 7.47 million
- Part of the 2022–23 North American winter

From December 21 to 26, 2022, an extratropical cyclone, referred to unofficially as Winter Storm Elliott by the Weather Channel and numerous media outlets, and sometimes dubbed The Blizzard of the Century and the 2022 Buffalo blizzard in New York State, created crippling winter storm conditions, including blizzards, high winds, snowfall, and record cold temperatures across the majority of the United States and parts of Canada. Impacted areas included parts of Minnesota, Iowa, Wisconsin, Michigan, Ohio, Pennsylvania, New York, and Ontario, with Buffalo, New York and the Fort Erie and the Kingston area of Ontario experiencing two full days of hazardous conditions and zero visibility. The cold wave affected all U.S. states from Colorado to the Eastern Seaboard, with effects felt as far south as Miami, Florida. On December 24, 110 million people across 36 states were subject to wind chill alerts.

The storm, and its related cold wave, killed at least 100 people, with six additional deaths occurring due to a simultaneous, smaller storm in the Pacific Northwest (British Columbia, Oregon, Washington). Forty-one of the deaths from the main storm occurred in the Buffalo area where lake-effect snowfall exceeded 56 in (140 cm) over a five-day period, while other deaths from that storm and the cold wave occurred across 17 states and the province of Ontario. The storm caused extensive vehicle pileups and road closures, particularly in the areas affected by blizzards or adjacent to those areas, with a complete driving ban imposed in Buffalo for five-and-a-half days. Due to the storm, more than 18,200 flights were canceled in the U.S. between December 22 and 28, while hundreds more were canceled in Canada. Buffalo Niagara International Airport was the most severely affected, as it was completely shut down for five days. Numerous inter-city passenger rail trips were delayed or canceled in the U.S., while in Ontario, Via Rail service between Toronto and Montreal or Ottawa was completely suspended for over 2 days due to a derailment. About 6.3 million households in the U.S. and 1.1 million in Canada were without power for some part of the storm.

The National Weather Service in Buffalo, New York, described it as a "once-in-a-generation storm" for Buffalo, and NOAA's Weather Prediction Center stated it was a "historic arctic outbreak".

== Meteorological history ==
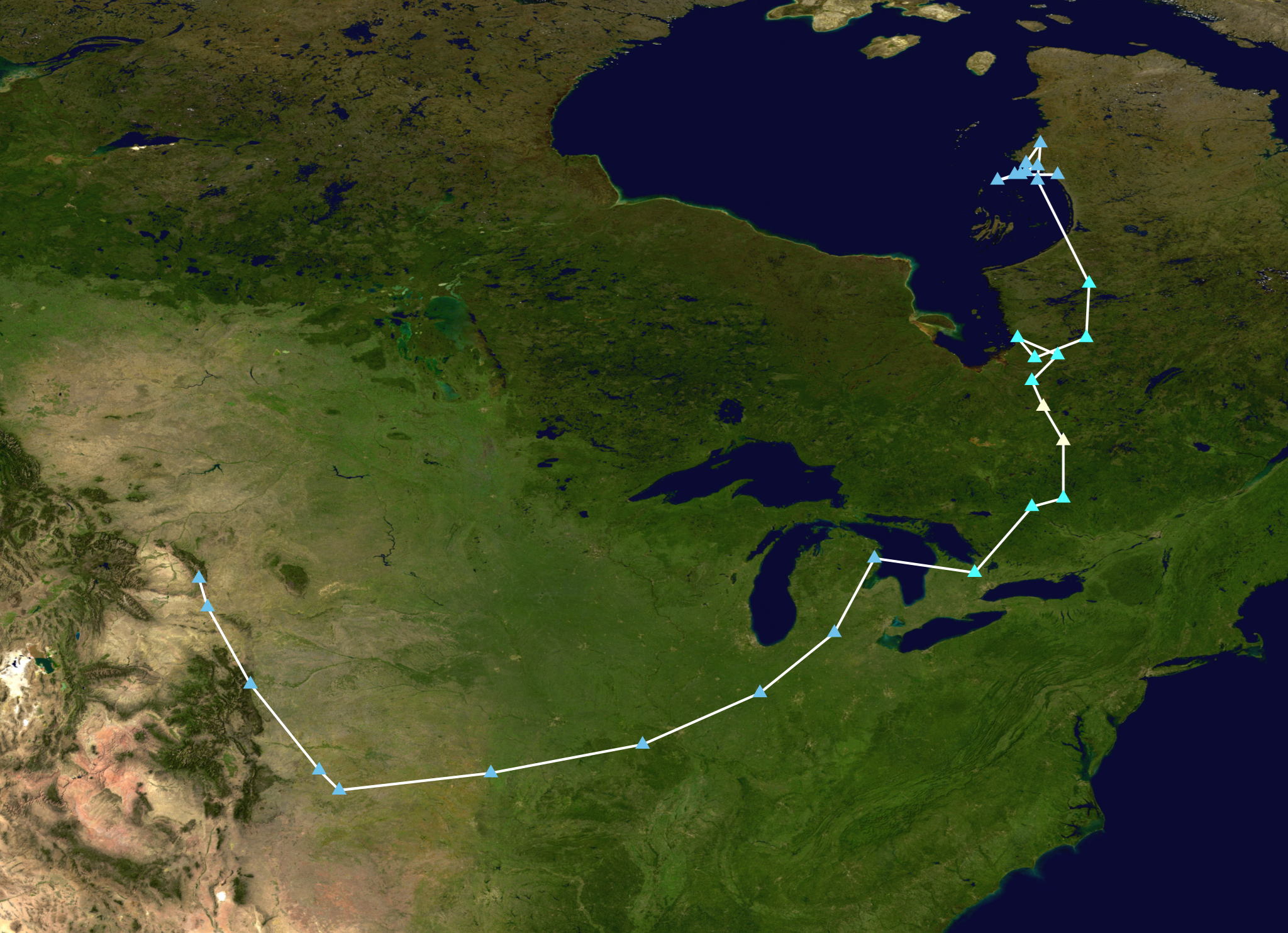
Map plotting the storm's track and intensity, according to the Saffir–Simpson scale Map key Saffir–Simpson scale Tropical depression (≤38 mph, ≤62 km/h) Tropical storm (39–73 mph, 63–118 km/h) Category 1 (74–95 mph, 119–153 km/h) Category 2 (96–110 mph, 154–177 km/h) Category 3 (111–129 mph, 178–208 km/h) Category 4 (130–156 mph, 209–251 km/h) Category 5 (≥157 mph, ≥252 km/h) Unknown Storm type Tropical cyclone Subtropical cyclone Extratropical cyclone, remnant low, tropical disturbance, or monsoon depression

The storm began to form on December 21, 2022, strengthening over the Northern Plains. It intensified over the next day, with The Weather Channel predicting that it would turn into a bomb cyclone. Blizzard conditions (visibility less than 0.25 miles [400 m] due to snow and wind gusts greater than 40 miles per hour [64 km/h]) were met in the rural areas of southern Minnesota, northern Iowa and southwestern Wisconsin. Duluth and Grand Marais Harbor, Minnesota, experienced wind gusts of 74 mph (119 km/h) and 82 mph (132 km/h), respectively, on December 23, causing damage to some buildings. Snowfalls on the northern Plains included up to 12 in (30 cm) in Minnesota, up to 5.9 in (15 cm) in Iowa, up to 4.0 in (10 cm) in Missouri and up to 15.6 in (40 cm) in Wisconsin. This blizzard, combined with the blizzard from the previous week, contributed to the wettest December on record in North Dakota. As the storm swept from Indiana into Ontario between the afternoons of December 23 and 24, the storm's pressure plummeted 35 millibars (35 hPa)—well over the threshold of 25 millibars (25 hPa) for a bomb cyclone—creating a massive wind field with bitterly frigid air.

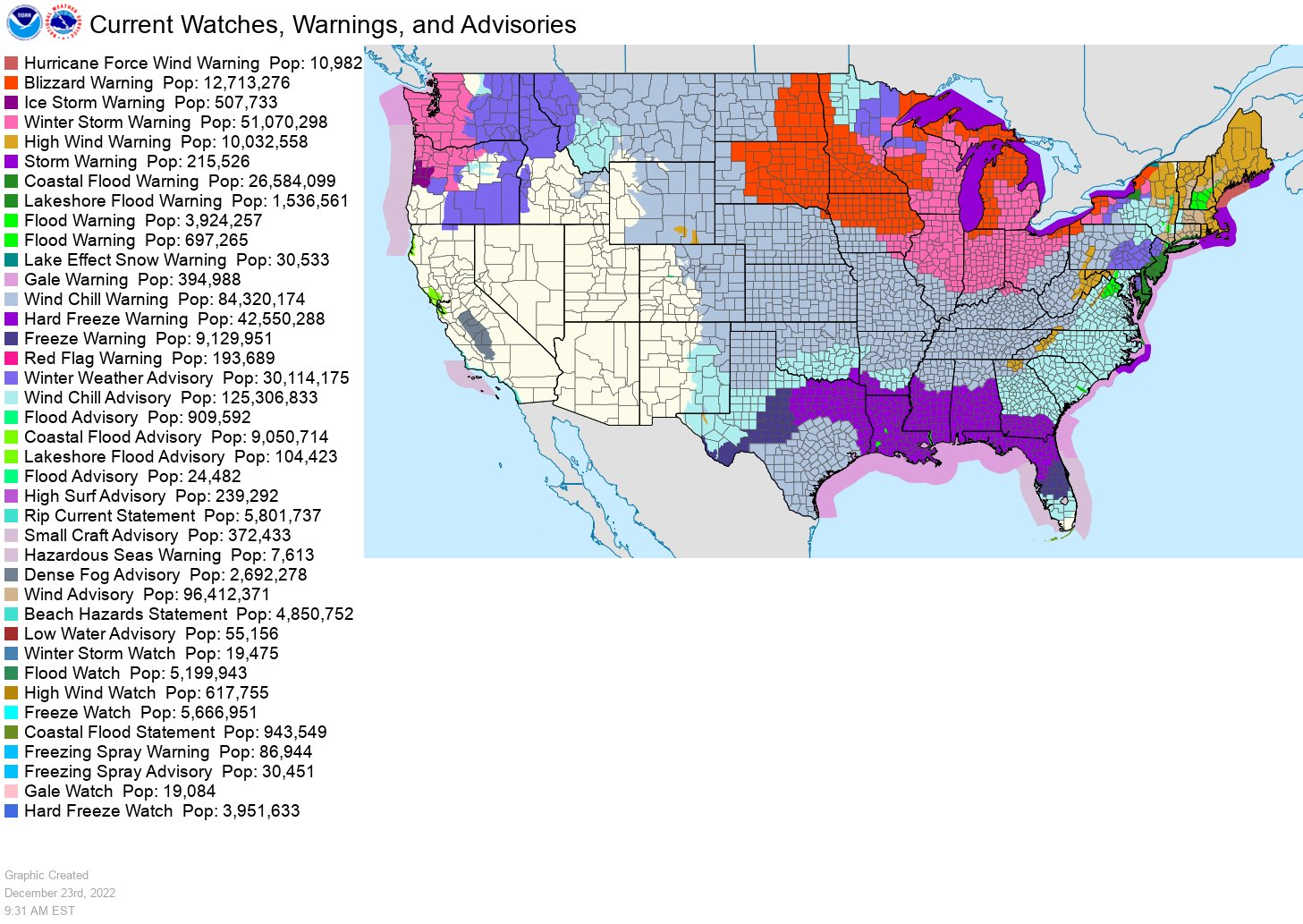
December 23, 2022, warnings, watches, and advisories issued by the National Weather Service

Detroit experienced three brief periods of whiteout on December 23, with visibility reduced to 1.5 miles (2.4 km) or less from 8 a.m. to 2:30 p.m. Grand Rapids, Michigan, had blizzard conditions/zero visibility from 10 a.m. to 10 p.m. on December 23, reduced visibility of 1.5 miles (2.4 km) or less until 5 p.m. on December 24, and received 24.8 in (63 cm) of snow between December 22 and 26. Baraga, in northwestern Michigan, received the most snowfall from the blizzard in the state, with 42.8 in (109 cm) of lake-effect snow. Blizzard conditions occurred in Cincinnati, Ohio, on December 23, despite no blizzard warning being issued for that area. Cleveland received a total of 3.6 inches (9 cm) of snow that day, while other parts of Ohio received up to 6.7 in (17 cm) and Kentucky received up to 5.2 in (13 cm).

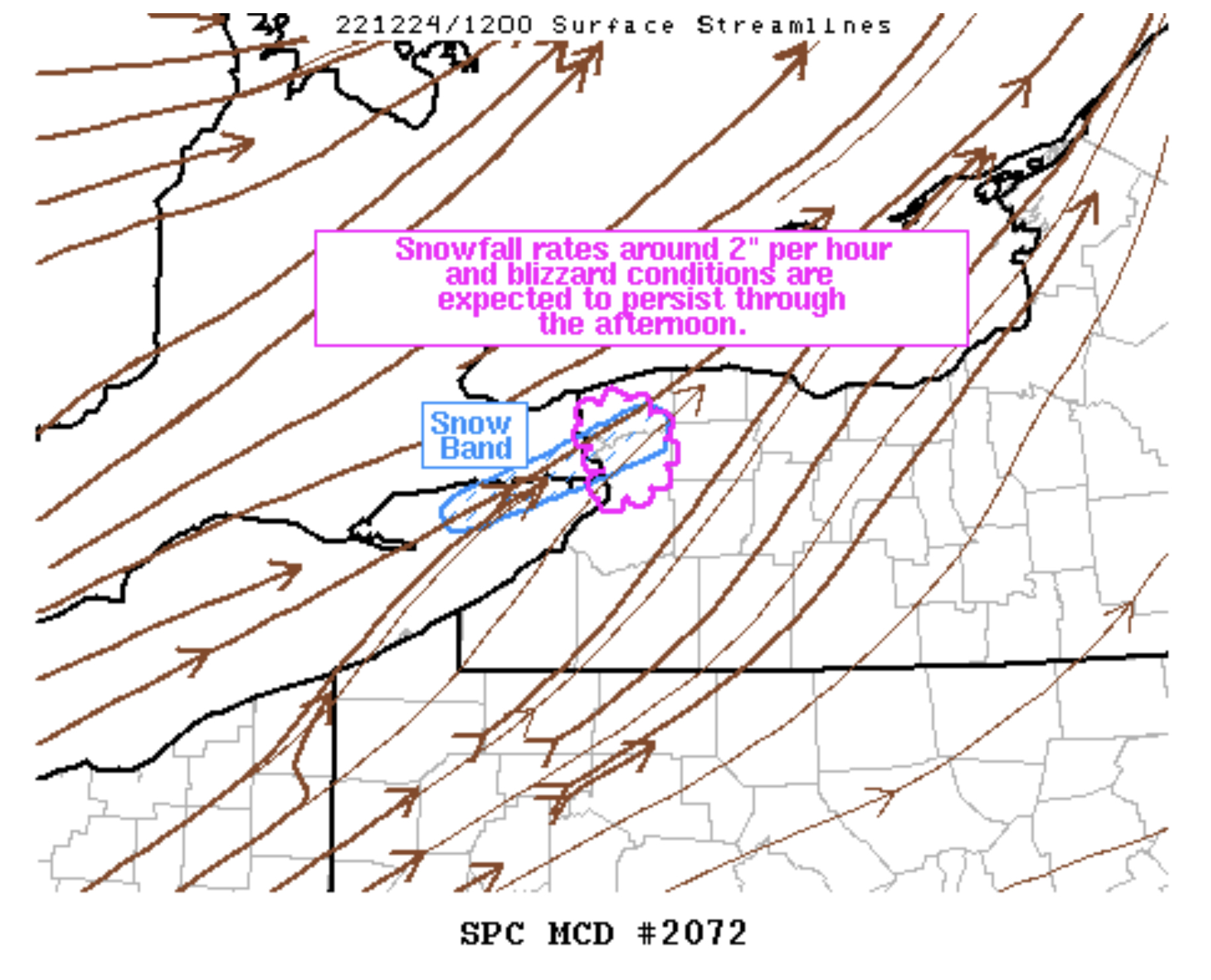
SPC Mesoscale Discussion #2072 indicating blizzard conditions around Buffalo, New York, on December 24

The blizzard's intense wind gusts blowing over the warm waters of Lake Erie triggered record lake-effect snow to Buffalo, New York, which at first fell as 1.98 mm (0.078 in) of rain but later converted to snow and accumulated to 56.5 in (144 cm) over five days in Snyder adjacent to Buffalo, ending on December 27. At Buffalo Niagara International Airport, snowfall reached a total of 51.9 in (132 cm). To the north, Niagara Falls received 18.9 inches (48 cm) of snowfall over the period. Buffalo experienced zero visibility/complete whiteout conditions from 9 a.m. on December 23 until 1 a.m. on December 25 and again from 5 a.m. until 7 a.m. on December 26. Buffalo's 37.5 consecutive hours of blizzard conditions was the longest blizzard in the city's history. Buffalo's first blizzard since January 6, 2014 (as defined by the National Weather Service) forced snow into massive drifts, shuttering the city and leaving hundreds stranded. Winds in Buffalo gusted over 45 mph (72 km/h) and at times exceeded 60 miles per hour (97 km/h). The highest reported winds in Buffalo were 79 mph (127 km/h). The blizzard also deposited high lake-effect snowfall amounts on northern New York; Henderson Harbor, near Watertown, recorded 40.8 in (104 cm) with the Watertown area experiencing blizzard conditions for parts of December 23, 24 and 25. Other parts of New York generally received between zero and 5 in (13 cm) of snowfall with New York City and other coastal areas of the northeast receiving only a dusting. The storm's winds created a seiche on Lake Erie, resulting in record-low water levels in the lake's western basin.

In the northeastern U.S., snowfall totals were as much as 8.1 in (21 cm) in Pennsylvania, 5.1 in (13 cm) in Maryland, 8.5 in (22 cm) in Massachusetts, 10.6 in (27 cm) in Vermont and 7.1 in (18 cm) in New Hampshire. As the storm began to exit the United States, it brought the fourth-highest high tide on record to Portland, Maine. Shortly after, a severe thunderstorm warning was put in place for New York City and for Long Island. The cold air left in the wake of the storm brought ocean-effect snow to Cape Cod.

In Ontario, among airport weather stations reporting wind speeds and visibility (Sarnia, London, Kitchener, Toronto, Hamilton, St. Catharines, Wiarton, Peterborough, Kingston, Ottawa), Kingston had blizzard conditions (visibility reduced to 400 meters [0.25 mi] or less due to blowing snow) from 2 p.m. on December 23 until 7 p.m. on December 24 along with a peak wind gust of 98 kilometers per hour (61 mph). Nearby Prince Edward County had some snow drifts as high as traffic signs and some even as high as telephone poles and also experienced blizzard and zero visibility conditions for much of December 23 and 24. Wiarton had blizzard conditions from noon until 9 p.m. on December 23, and Chatham had visibility of 200 meters (0.12 mi) from 8 a.m. until 7 p.m. on December 23, with peak wind gusts of 89 kilometers per hour (55 mph). In addition, St. Catharines had seven hours of visibility of 400 meters (0.25 mi) or less on December 23, with peak wind gusts of 96 km/h on both that day and December 24, and Hamilton had six hours of 400 meters (0.25 mi) or less visibility, including one hour of zero-meter visibility, on December 23. The southern half of the Niagara Region, including Fort Erie, had blizzard conditions for most of December 23 and 24, leading the Niagara Region to declare a state of emergency. An average of 76 centimeters (30 in) of snow fell in Fort Erie with drifts as high as 3 meters (9.8 ft) while peak wind gusts of 125 km/h were recorded in nearby Port Colborne.

In Quebec, Montreal experienced four hours of 600 meters (0.37 mi) visibility and winds exceeding 50 kilometers per hour (31 mph) overnight from December 23 to 24, while Quebec City experienced the same for four hours early the morning of December 24. A gust of 121 kilometers per hour (75 mph) was recorded in Quebec City, while Baie-Comeau experienced a gust measured at 130 kilometers per hour (81 mph); both are new all-time December records. Baie-Comeau experienced three hours of blizzard conditions on December 25.

== Preparations ==
On December 21, Georgia governor Brian Kemp declared a state of emergency and warned the public.

On December 22, 2022, President Joe Biden asked Americans to "please take this storm extremely seriously". Additionally, South Dakota governor Kristi Noem declared a winter storm emergency for the state and activated the National Guard. States of emergency were also declared in Colorado, Connecticut, Kansas, Kentucky, Maryland, Missouri, North Carolina, New York, Oklahoma, West Virginia, and Wisconsin. Ahead of the winter storm, many people decided to cancel Christmas celebrations.

Environment Canada issued a blizzard warning for a large swath of southwestern and midwestern Ontario (notably not including the Greater Toronto Area), as well as southern Niagara Region, areas east of Georgian Bay and the eastern end of Lake Ontario, including Kingston and Prince Edward County, while winter storm warnings were issued for the remainder of Southern Ontario.

On December 24, the City of Buffalo issued a post on social media, which some viewed as "the scariest tweet I've ever seen" as they announced that the city currently had "no emergency services available" for Buffalo and a number of other towns.

== Impact ==
=== Deaths ===
Fatalities from two storms
Country	Regions	Deaths
Canada	British Columbia	4
Canada	Ontario	2
United States	Colorado	6
United States	Georgia	2
United States	Kansas	3
United States	Kentucky	3
United States	Maryland	1
United States	Michigan	8
United States	Mississippi	1
United States	Missouri	3
United States	Nebraska	1
United States	New York	43
United States	Ohio	16
United States	Oklahoma	3
United States	Oregon	1
United States	Pennsylvania	1
United States	South Carolina	2
United States	South Dakota	1
United States	Tennessee	1
United States	Vermont	1
United States	Washington	1
United States	Wisconsin	2
Total:		106

Storm-related deaths reached above 100 and occurred from diverse causes, including cold exposure outside or inside homes without heat or inside marooned cars, traffic accidents, falling trees or branches, electrocutions, carbon monoxide poisonings and a house fire caused by unsafe heating methods.

In Oklahoma, dangerous road conditions caused by the storm caused multiple accidents, killing three persons. In Kansas, three persons died due to car crashes in icy conditions. In Kentucky, three people died; two died as a result of car accidents, while the other person was homeless, which caused them to die to exposure. Missouri had three deaths from vehicular collisions while Nebraska had one. In Wisconsin, one person died from a traffic collision while another died from falling through ice on a river.

In northern Frederick County, Maryland, a man died after a tree fell on his car while he was driving west on MD 77. In Pennsylvania, a person died when trees and hydro poles fell onto their car. Vermont also had a person die when a tree fell on them.

In Ohio, an accident involving more than 50 vehicles on the eastbound lanes of the Ohio Turnpike in Sandusky County closed the highway for multiple hours and caused four fatalities. Four people died in other vehicular collisions, a utility worker was electrocuted while trying to restore power and a 72-year-old woman died from exposure. A family of six also died in a house fire where they were using unsafe heating methods.

In Colorado, six people, four in Colorado Springs, and two in Denver, reportedly died from exposure to the cold. Georgia had two deaths from exposure, while Tennessee, Mississippi, and South Dakota, each had one. In South Carolina, one person died when his oxygen machine would not function due to lost power, while another died from exposure while fixing a pipe to his house. In mid-Michigan, four people died from exposure, three from cardiac arrest while shoveling or blowing snow, and one from carbon monoxide poisoning while in their car.

The intense blizzard, winds and cold in the Buffalo, New York, region caused 41 deaths (34 in Buffalo and seven in Cheektowaga, both within Erie County), 17 of them pedestrians who had become disoriented and were found dead in snowbanks, as well as four drivers stranded in their cars for over two days, 11 residents who died in their homes without heat, four who died from cardiac arrest while shoveling snow, three residents who died when emergency crews could not respond in time of medical crisis and two who died from blizzard-related injuries. On December 28, the National Guard went door to door in parts of Buffalo to check on people who had been without electricity due to the blizzard. The 2022 storm was even deadlier than the Blizzard of 1977 for the region. Two other people died within New York, including one from carbon monoxide poisoning in Lockport in eastern Niagara County.

In southwestern Ontario, two people died from exposure. In Ontario's hard-hit Niagara Region, the Emergency Medical Services acting Chief stated December 27, "at this time EMS is not able to confirm any deaths or injuries directly or solely attributable to the storm" and "emergency medical responses are complex, with many factors often contributing to a medical event, and it would be impossible to accurately quantify the effect of the storm on patient outcomes." He added that his paramedics "focused our limited resources on the highest priority calls, ensuring those who were in the greatest need were attended to as quickly as possible" and acknowledged that paramedics responded to calls regarding chest pain and cardiac events brought on by snow removal, as well as incidents with people using gas-fueled devices indoors. The Port Colborne Fire and Emergency Services Chief said his team responded to multiple incidents regarding carbon monoxide, including one with "very serious" injuries but would not detail exact outcomes.

=== Infrastructure ===
==== Flight delays and cancellations ====
The storm forced the cancellation of at least 1,000 flights by December 21, according to flight tracking company FlightAware, with Denver International Airport canceling 500 flights. By December 22, Flight-aware reported that more than 10,000 flights had been delayed or canceled. By December 28, FlightAware.com reported that greater than 18,200 flights for between December 22 and 28 had to be canceled.

Buffalo Niagara International Airport was completely closed from the morning of December 23 until the morning of December 28. Snow clearing equipment from Pittsburgh International Airport was brought in to assist in clearing the over four feet of snow from the runways. Most flights at Cleveland's Hopkins Airport were canceled on December 23, 2022. Chicago's two airports canceled more than 820 flights by December 23 at 5 p.m. due to the poor weather.

In Canada, WestJet cancelled all flights (140) in Ontario and Quebec for December 23. Air Canada canceled hundreds of flights across Canada on December 23 and 24. Two-thirds of arrivals and one-third of departures for Toronto Pearson International Airport were canceled on December 23.

A separate storm in the Pacific Northwest caused the closure two of the three operational runways at Seattle–Tacoma International Airport. Alaska Airlines temporarily halted flights from Seattle–Tacoma International Airport and Portland International Airport on December 23. WestJet canceled 126 flights in British Columbia. Vancouver International Airport cancelled all flights on the morning of December 20 due to the snowstorm, leading to an "unprecedented impact on flights".

On December 25, 2022, Southwest Airlines canceled 48% of its scheduled flights. The following day, December 26, Southwest canceled another 2,886 flights, which represented approximately 70% of its scheduled flights for that day. The United States Department of Transportation called the cancellations "unacceptable" and said it would "closely examine" Southwest's actions. On December 28, it was announced Southwest Airlines had canceled more flights for an extended period as a result of damage to operational systems which occurred from the storm.

==== Road closures and crashes ====
Road closures were prevalent during the storm. In North Dakota, portions of I-94, U.S. 281, U.S. 52 and ND 46 were closed due to icy and near zero-visibility conditions. More than 100 vehicles were left struck in intense snow on I-90 between Rapid City and Wall in South Dakota prompting authorities to move in to rescue all of the motorists by transporting them to shelter. Nearly 90 miles (140 km) of I-35 in Iowa closed down due to low visibility from the blizzard. In Minnesota, all of Interstate 90 west of Albert Lea closed. Portions of I-435 closed in Kansas City, Missouri, as well. I-94 had multiple major crashes in western Michigan. In Gallatin County, Kentucky, I-71 was closed multiple times due to multiple crashes and icy conditions with some drivers stranded in traffic for up 34 hours. On I-69 near Fort Wayne, Indiana, a 12-vehicle pile-up, including a snow plow, blocked the highway on December 23, while smaller collisions also blocked I-94 and I-65 in Indiana. A 50-vehicle pileup, including at least 15 commercial vehicles such as semi-trailer trucks, occurred Friday afternoon on the eastbound Ohio Turnpike in Sandusky County, Ohio. Both directions of the turnpike were closed for the stretch between SR 53 and SR 4 until mid-afternoon Saturday while crews cleared the road.

All major highways in western New York were closed for four to five days due to the blizzard. The morning of December 23, the city of Niagara Falls, New York, issued a travel ban with exceptions for essential travel. Erie County, New York, which includes the city of Buffalo, followed suit shortly afterwards. As of the morning of December 27, the travel ban remained in effect only for Buffalo. On December 27, state and military police were sent to Buffalo to enforce the driving ban to enable snow-clearing efforts to progress. The Erie County Sheriff indicated that over 420 EMS calls had gone unanswered because emergency vehicles were unable to travel through the deep snow. During the height of the blizzard, two-thirds of emergency vehicles sent out to rescue people had ended up needing to be rescued themselves. City officials say this marked the first time in Buffalo's history that the fire department could not respond to calls. Buffalo announced a two-day effort for December 27 and 28 to clear at least one lane on every street in the city to accommodate emergency vehicles. Front-loader tractors were used to shovel the snow into dump trucks as the snow was too deep to plow to the side of streets or in other cases, there was nowhere to plow it. Hundreds of vehicles, including tractor-trailer rigs and buses, were snowed in and abandoned all over the city; over 500 people were rescued from snowed-in cars, some having been trapped for up to two days. After more than five-and-a-half days in effect, the City of Buffalo lifted its driving ban at 12:01 a.m. December 29 on the basis that streets had been adequately cleared.

In northern New York, Jefferson County, which includes Watertown, had a driving ban in effect from December 23 until December 25. Further south in the Capital Region, parts of NY-143 were shut down due to flooding. In New York City, part of the Henry Hudson Parkway closed in the Bronx. In New Jersey, several interstate highways, as well as Route 440, were shut down to commercial travel until further notice starting at 9 a.m. on December 23. The Verrazzano–Narrows Bridge was also closed down, and in southern Long Island, parts of the Meadowbrook State Parkway and Wantagh State Parkway were shut down.

In southwestern Ontario, Highway 401 was closed December 23 between London and Tilbury, west of Chatham, due to about 100 vehicles, including numerous tractor trailers, being involved in multiple collisions, while Highway 402 was closed between London and Sarnia because of a 50-vehicle pileup and deteriorating conditions. Early in the afternoon, the Ontario Provincial Police (O.P.P.) announced that all highways and roads in Perth and Huron counties were closed due to blizzard conditions while, later in the afternoon, the OPP closed all highways and roads in Bruce and Dufferin counties, some in Grey County and Highway 21 between Sarnia and Grand Bend within Lambton County. While Highway 401 was reopened in the early evening of December 24, Highway 402 and all roads in Perth, Huron, Bruce, Grey, and Dufferin counties remained closed the evening of December 24.

All bridges between the Niagara Region of Canada and the Niagara Falls/Buffalo area of New York State were closed at 4:30 p.m. on December 23 due to county-wide travel bans in western New York. The QEW in southern Niagara Region was closed from December 23 to 25 due to heavy snowfall and blizzard conditions. In southern Niagara, snow drifts were so deep that most police vehicles and plows became stuck themselves and had to be abandoned until the snowfall subsided on December 25. The three-meter snow drifts across four-meter roads were too much for most snow plows to penetrate, so front-end loaders were being used, and bigger snow plows and additional front-end loaders were being brought in from other municipalities, thus making the snow-clearing process slower than desirable.

In eastern Ontario, the OPP closed all roads in Prince Edward County, west of Kingston, from December 24 until the morning of December 26 because of zero visibility, snow buildup and many cars abandoned on roadways. Highway 417 between Ottawa and the Ontario-Quebec border was closed from 11 a.m. December 24 until 9 a.m. December 25 while Highway 401 between Quinte West and the Ontario-Quebec border was closed from the morning of December 24 until 10 a.m. December 25. In central Ontario, Highway 11 was closed from Orillia to Huntsville beginning on December 24.

On Christmas Eve in British Columbia, icy road conditions resulted in a bus rolling over and crashing on Highway 97C between Kelowna and Merritt due to icy roads following another storm, killing four people and injuring 36. Meanwhile, Interstate 90 in Washington was closed from North Bend to Ellensburg.

==== Intra-city transit disruptions ====
In the Chicago area, the extreme cold and storm conditions caused transit disruptions, including service suspension on the South Shore for the afternoon on December 23 and on December 24, with both the CTA and Metra reporting issues with freezing track switches and mechanical failures.

In the Buffalo-Niagara area, all transit service was suspended from the morning of December 23 until the morning of December 27, at which time reduced Metro Rail Service—trains departing every 30 minutes—was restarted; bus service was resumed on some routes the morning of December 28.

In the New York Metropolitan Area, trains experienced delays due to flooding. The Long Beach Branch of the Long Island Rail Road was shut down in both directions between Penn Station and Long Beach due to flash flooding, and the Metro North Hudson line was temporarily suspended between Poughkeepsie and Peekskill because of flooding as well. The New Jersey Transit experienced up to 30-minute delays. The Staten Island Ferry was suspended for around an hour. All buses in Queens were delayed, with the Q53-SBS being totally suspended.

In Ontario, GO Transit (servicing the Greater Golden Horseshoe around Toronto) implemented its snow plan on December 23, which reduced peak train service and suspended express trains, and canceled some buses in the Niagara Region, where winds of 100 km/h were anticipated. The Toronto Transit Commission suspended service at 41 bus stops at hilly locations and suspended service on Line 3 Scarborough of the Toronto subway for December 23.

In the Seattle area, a separate storm resulted in all buses operated by King County Metro and Sound Transit being canceled due to icy road conditions. The Seattle Center Monorail was also suspended. BC Transit suspended all bus service to Victoria for the day.

==== Inter-city train delays and cancellations ====
Numerous Amtrak trains were delayed, ran on modified schedules, or were canceled entirely between December 22 and 24, due to the storm.

Canada's VIA Rail experienced weather-related issues with nine trains in the Quebec City–Windsor Corridor being delayed on December 23 and 24 due to trees and branches falling on the tracks or on the trains themselves; passengers on some trains were stranded near Cobourg for more than 18 hours. In the afternoon of December 24, a freight train derailed forcing VIA to cancel all trains between Toronto and Ottawa or Montreal for that day, December 25 and 26.

==== Energy emergencies ====
The Federal Motor Carrier Safety Administration declared an emergency covering 44 U.S. states and Washington, D.C., on December 22, suspending statutory driving time limits and other regulatory restrictions. Colorado, Iowa, North Carolina, South Dakota, and Wisconsin all made similar declarations on a state level.

==== Power outages ====
On December 23, PowerOutage.us reported that nearly 1.5 million customers were without power. Of those power outages, Maine recorded over 250,000 customers without power, North Carolina over 180,000, and more than 100,000 in Virginia, Tennessee, and New York each. High load caused the Tennessee Valley Authority in the southeastern U.S. to announce several hours of rolling blackouts throughout much of their service area. Duke Energy followed suit because of cold temperatures on December 24. The Buffalo-Niagara Falls area had 108,000 customers without power at different times during the storm. In total, over the course of the storm, 6.3 million households across the U.S. were without power at some point.

About 670,000 households in Quebec were without power at different times during the storm. In Ontario, 430,000 households were without power at different points in time during the storm. About 70,000 in New Brunswick lost power.

=== Sports ===
The National Hockey League postponed two games that were originally scheduled to be played on December 23: the Detroit Red Wings–Ottawa Senators game was moved to February 27, and the Tampa Bay Lightning–Buffalo Sabres game was rescheduled to March 4. The Sabres' road game against the Columbus Blue Jackets on December 27 was also postponed as the Buffalo area's travel ban remained in effect and the Buffalo airport remained closed.

The National Football League postponed kickoff for a game between the Tennessee Titans and Houston Texans for an hour because of the rolling blackouts in the area.

=== Corporate and institutional closures ===
Food processor Tyson Foods suspended operations at some of its plants as a result of the storm. Many delivery services, including Amazon, FedEx, UPS, and USPS, had major delays at hubs or closures of processing sites due to weather conditions.

In Southern Ontario, most school boards, including those as far east as Ottawa, closed schools for December 23. In Vaughan, Ontario, Canada's Wonderland closed WinterFest on December 23 due to the storm.

Many national parks in the United States closed due to the winter storm. These included, but are not limited to, the Knife River Indian Villages National Historic Site in North Dakota, Badlands National Park in South Dakota, Appomattox Court House National Historical Park in Virginia, and Carl Sandburg Home National Historic Site in North Carolina. However, Big Bend National Park remained open, despite wind chills predicted to sink as low as −3 °F (−19 °C).

In Pigeon Forge, Tennessee, Dollywood was closed on December 23, 24 and 25 due to the wind chill being below zero. The park opened on December 26 at 1:00 p.m., two hours later than the scheduled opening time, but closed three hours early at 6:00 p.m. due to snow and ice. The park was closed again on December 27.

=== Animals ===
In Houston, Texas, about 1,600 roosting bats lost their grip due to hypothermia and fell to the ground. They were saved by animal activists who administered fluids and kept them warm in incubators. Once recovered, the bats were released back to their habitats—two Houston-area bridges.

== Post-storm cold wave ==
Animation of high temperatures from December 11 to 28

After the storm struck, a widespread cold wave moved through the United States from bitterly cold air that entered the United States from Siberia, sending states into a deep freeze with temperatures and wind chills reaching well below zero, from the West to the East coast.

=== Rocky Mountain region ===
Denver saw 3.9 in (9.9 cm) of snow, as temperatures fell to −24 °F (−31 °C), the coldest temperature in the city since exactly 32 years earlier in 1990, and just one degree shy of tying the monthly record low. Parts of the state saw over a foot (30 cm) of snow. Denver saw their largest hourly temperature drop on December 21 from 4–5 p.m., as temperatures fell from 42 °F (6 °C) to 5 °F (−15 °C), and the total drop from 51 °F (11 °C) to −24 °F (−31 °C) became the second-largest two-day temperature swing in Denver. With a high of just −6 °F (−21 °C), the mean temperature in Denver of −15 °F (−26 °C) was their second-coldest mean temperature on record. The cold wave was responsible for six deaths across the state. Cheyenne, Wyoming, also broke their hourly temperature-drop record in just 30 minutes, as temperatures fell from 43 °F (6 °C) to 3 °F (−16 °C) from 1:05 p.m. to 1:35 p.m. In Casper, the low of −42 °F (−41 °C) set an all-time record for the lowest temperature ever in Casper. In Elk Park, Montana, the wind chill reached as low as −74 °F (−59 °C). The low of −50 °F (−46 °C) was likely as low as the sensor could detect. In Alberta, the city of Calgary set a daily record for December 20 at −32 °C (−26 °F), with parts of the province reaching −48 °C (−54 °F).

=== Central United States ===
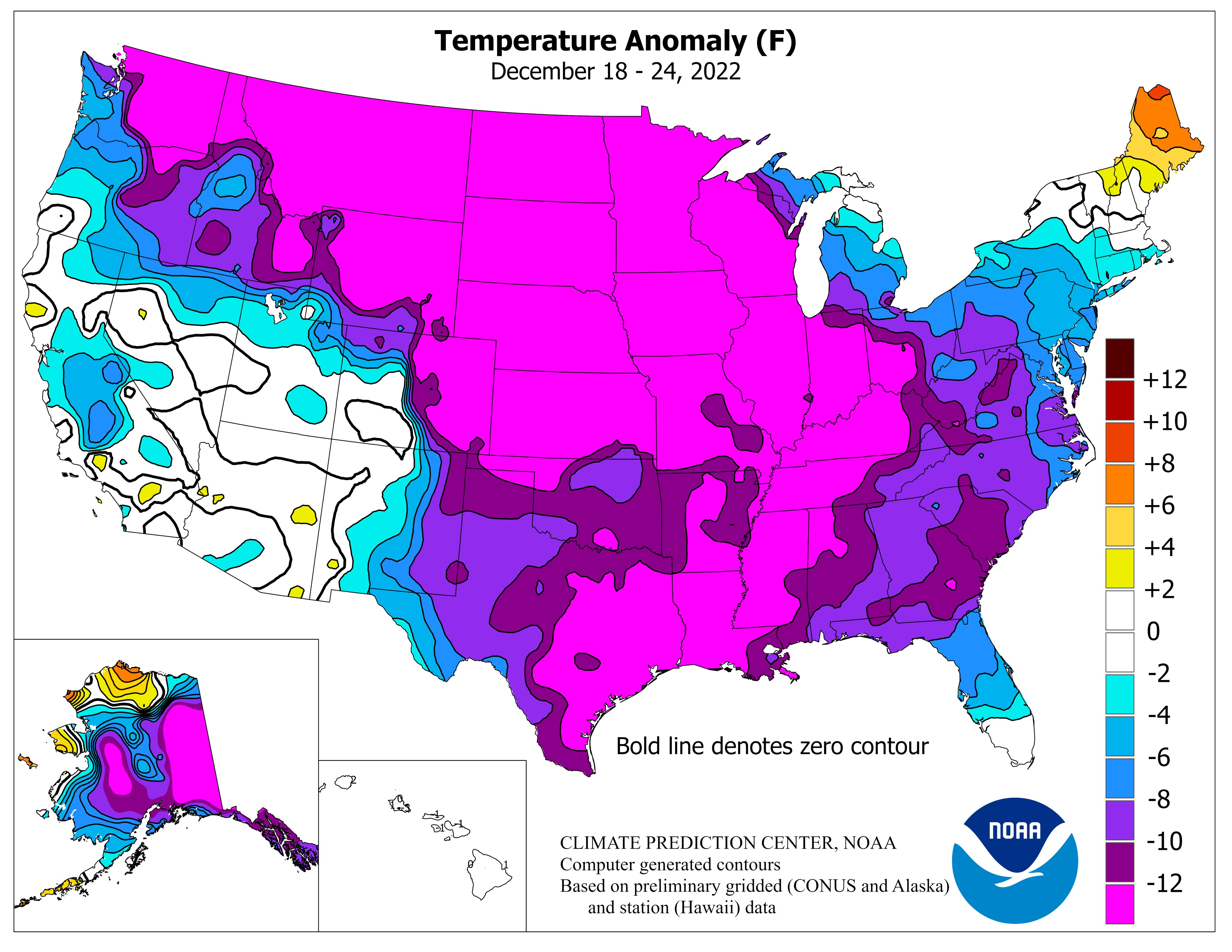
December 18–24 temperature anomaly in the United States

Overnight in Kansas City, temperatures dropped from 32 °F (0 °C) to −2 °F (−19 °C) in just six hours. Austin, Texas experienced their second-ever wind chill warning, with the first occurring in February 2021. In Nashville, the low of −1 °F (−18 °C) on December 23 was the coldest low temperature in the city since 1996, although no daily record was set. However, Tulsa, Oklahoma, set a daily record low that morning of −9 °F (−23 °C). Chicago recorded 29 hours below 0 °F (−18 °C), and their coldest December day since 1983. Youngstown, Ohio, also set a record low that morning of −5 °F (−21 °C). Cincinnati, Ohio, experienced the largest twelve-hour temperature drop on record of 52 °F (29 °C) as well as the coldest wind chill since the January 1994 North American cold wave, reaching −36 °F (−38 °C) with an air temperature of −8 °F (−22 °C) the morning of December 23, 2022. In Gas City, Indiana, wind chills reached as low as −41 °F (−41 °C). Jackson, Mississippi, which had already experienced a water crisis in August 2022, had pipes break and water pressure problems, causing mayor Chokwe Antar Lumumba to declare a state of emergency in addition to a boil-water advisory the city had already issued. Schools had to switch to remote learning as the boil-water notice still had not been lifted as of January 4 and some areas still had little or no water pressure.

=== Eastern United States ===
On December 23, Athens, Georgia, saw its coldest temperature since 1989 and set a daily low-temperature record of 11 °F (−12 °C) after the cold front moved through. That day, the Blue Ridge Parkway closed due to ice on the roads and wind chills as low as −45 °F (−43 °C) on Grandfather Mountain in North Carolina. On December 24, new daily record-low temperatures were established in Pittsburgh, Pennsylvania, and Charleston, South Carolina, at −5 °F (−21 °C) and 20 °F (−7 °C), respectively. Most of the New York Metropolitan Area observed record cold highs on December 24, though Central Park's high of 15 °F (−9 °C) did not break the record. The extreme temperature drop, combined with flooding in the morning of December 23, caused several cars to be stuck in frozen floodwaters in Edgewater, New Jersey. Frozen floodwaters also resulted in Orient Beach State Park being ordered to close. Several cities in the East Coast saw record cold highs on Christmas Eve, however. Washington, D.C., set a record for the coldest high temperature on Christmas Eve at 22 °F (−6 °C), Philadelphia set a record cold high at 18 °F (−8 °C), Baltimore tied its record cold high of 20 °F (−7 °C), and Mount Pocono, Pennsylvania, smashed their record cold high for the date reaching 4 °F (−16 °C). A wind chill advisory was issued for Philadelphia as wind chills were forecast to reach as low as −20 °F (−29 °C). The extreme cold in Philadelphia followed their largest daily temperature drop on record, as temperatures fell from 59 °F (15 °C) to 9 °F (−13 °C) on December 23. In Baltimore, the Baltimore Ravens experienced their coldest kickoff temperature on record, at 17 °F (−8 °C), with a wind chill of only 2 °F (−17 °C). The Carolina Panthers in Charlotte also had their coldest-ever home game with a kickoff temperature of 20 °F (−7 °C). In Asheville, North Carolina, water outages that lasted as much as a week resulted when basins at an intake location froze, and leaks developed elsewhere in the system. Within the city of Richmond, Virginia, low temperatures hovered around 10 °F (−12 °C) with the highs briefly reaching 24 °F (−4 °C), tying a daily record. Heavy winds in the area reached 45 mph (72 km/h), leading to over 80,000 residents without electricity. Wind chills reached −11 °F (−24 °C) in Richmond. The bitter cold resulted in $3.5 million in damage across West Virginia. Lingering cold air left over Atlanta combined with a clipper resulted in 0.1 in (0.25 cm) of snow on December 26, tying a daily record.

Further south in Florida, Tampa froze on consecutive nights for the first time since 2010. Some parts of Central Florida even recorded sleet and snow flurries on Christmas. This caused some of the tallest rides at Universal Studios Orlando to close. 2022 became the coldest for high temperatures in Miami at 50 °F (10 °C), Fort Lauderdale at 49 °F (9 °C), Naples at 52 °F (11 °C) and tied the record at Palm Beach at 47 °F (8 °C). In Fort Lauderdale, the high tied for the second-coldest high on record. The high in Marathon was also a record-cold 56 °F (13 °C). Saint Petersburg also set a record cold high on Christmas, at 44 °F (7 °C).

== See also ==
- Weather of 2022
- 2022–23 North American winter
  - 2022–2023 California floods
- Great Blizzard of 1899
- December 1989 United States cold wave
- 1994 North American cold wave
- January–March 2014 North American cold wave
- February 2015 North American cold wave
- February 2021 North American cold wave
- November 13–21, 2014 North American winter storm
- November 2022 Great Lakes winter storm
- December 2015 North American storm complex
