= Tortel Fjord =

Tortel Fjord (Spanish: Fiordo de Tortel) is an inlet of the Pacific Ocean in Chile's Aysén Region. The village of Caleta Tortel is located at the head of fjord. The fjord may lie in a zone of tectonic extension. The shores of the fiord are known to freeze in exceptionally cold winters.
