= Cold wave =

Weather phenomenon

A cold wave (known in some regions as a cold snap, cold spell, Arctic blast, or Arctic snap) is a weather phenomenon that is distinguished by a cooling of the air. Specifically, as used by the U.S. National Weather Service, a cold wave is a rapid fall in temperature within a 24-hour period requiring substantially increased protection to agriculture, industry, commerce, and social activities. The precise criteria for a cold wave are the rate at which the temperature falls, and the minimum to which it falls. This minimum temperature is dependent on the geographical region and time of year.

In the United States, a cold spell is defined as the national average high temperature dropping below 20 °F (−7 °C). A cold wave of sufficient magnitude and duration may be classified as a cold air outbreak (CAO).

== Effects ==
=== Impact on humans and livestocks health ===
A cold wave can cause death and injury to livestock and wildlife. Exposure to cold mandates greater caloric intake for all animals, including humans, and if a cold wave is accompanied by heavy and persistent snow, grazing animals may be unable to reach needed food and die of hypothermia or starvation. They often necessitate the purchase of foodstuffs to feed livestock at considerable cost to farmers.

Cold spells are associated with increased mortality rates in populations around the world. Both cold waves and heat waves cause deaths, though different groups of people may be susceptible to different weather events. More temperature-attributable deaths occur during a cold wave than in a heat wave, though the mortality rate is higher in undeveloped regions of the world.

=== Infrastructure ===
Extreme winter cold often causes poorly insulated water pipelines and mains to freeze. Even some poorly protected indoor plumbing ruptures as water expands within them, causing much damage to property and costly insurance claims. Demand for electrical power and fuels rises dramatically during such times, even though the generation of electrical power may fail due to the freezing of water necessary for the generation of hydroelectricity. Some metals may become brittle at low temperatures. Motor vehicles may fail when antifreeze fails, fuel or oil gels, or batteries fail producing a failure of the transportation system.

Fires become even more of a hazard during extreme cold. Water mains may break and water supplies may become unreliable, making firefighting more difficult. The air during a cold wave is typically denser and thus contains more oxygen, so when air that a fire draws in becomes unusually cold it is likely to cause a more intense fire. However, snow may stop spreading of fires, especially wildfires.

=== Plants and animals ===
Winter cold waves that are not considered cold in some areas, but cause temperatures significantly below average for an area, are also destructive. Areas with subtropical climates may recognize a cold wave at higher temperatures than other, colder areas of the globe. The cold wave may be recognized at barely freezing temperatures, as these are still unusually cold for the region, and plant and animal life will be less tolerant of such cold. The same winter temperatures that one associates with the norm for Colorado, Ohio, or Bavaria are catastrophic to crops in places like Florida, California, or parts of South America that grow fruit and vegetables in winter.

Cold waves that bring unexpected freezes and frosts during the growing season in mid-latitude zones can kill plants during the early and most vulnerable stages of growth, resulting in crop failure as plants are killed before they can be harvested economically. Such cold waves have caused famines. At times as deadly to plants as drought, cold waves can leave land in danger of later brush and forest fires that consume dead biomass. One extreme was the so-called Year Without a Summer of 1816, one of several years during the 1810s in which numerous crops failed during freakish summer cold snaps after volcanic eruptions that reduced incoming sunlight.

=== Extratropical cyclone formation ===
Recent research suggests a possible link between cold waves in North America and extratropical cyclogenesis over the East Atlantic. These may be connected by large-scale atmospheric circulation patterns. Examples include Rossby wave propagation from the North Pacific or an upper-level anticyclone west of Greenland. In Europe, the advection of cold air masses from the northeast emerges as a potential precursor signal for the majority of cold waves, significantly affecting the energy, health, and agricultural sectors of the continent.

== Countermeasures ==
In some places, such as Siberia, extreme cold requires that fuel-powered machinery intended to be used occasionally must be run continually. Internal plumbing can be wrapped, and persons can often run water continuously through pipes. Energy conservation, difficult as it is in a cold wave, may require such measures as collecting people (especially the poor and elderly) in communal shelters. Even the homeless may be arrested and taken to shelters, only to be released when the hazard abates. Hospitals can prepare for the admission of victims of frostbite and hypothermia; schools and other public buildings can be converted into shelters.

People can stock up on food, water, and other necessities before a cold wave. Some may even choose to migrate to places of milder climates, at least during the winter. Suitable stocks of forage can be secured before cold waves for livestock, and livestock in vulnerable areas might be shipped from affected areas or even slaughtered. Smudge pots can bring smoke that prevents hard freezes on a farm or grove. Vulnerable crops may be sprayed with water that will paradoxically protect the plants by freezing and absorbing the cold from surrounding air.

Most people can dress appropriately and can layer their clothing should they need to go outside or should their heating fail. They can also stock candles, matches, flashlights, and portable fuel for cooking and wood for fireplaces or wood stoves, as necessary. However, caution should be taken as the use of charcoal fires for cooking or heating within an enclosed dwelling is extremely dangerous due to carbon monoxide poisoning. Adults must remain aware of the exposure that children and the elderly have to cold.

== Historical cold waves ==
=== 17th century cold waves (1601–1700) ===
- Great Frost of 1683–84, the worst frost in England in its history. The cold caused the entire River Thames to freeze up to a depth of 1 foot (0.30 m). The frost enabled the River Thames Frost Fair. See Maunder Minimum
- Europe winter of 1694–1695. See Maunder Minimum

=== 18th century cold waves (1701–1800) ===
- Great Frost of 1709, the coldest winter in Europe ever recorded.

=== 19th century cold waves (1801–1900) ===
1835

- Eastern cold wave of January and February 1835. First of three historic U.S. cold waves to hit during the 19th century (1835, 1857, 1899). In January, mercury thermometers froze throughout the Northeast. Mercury froze at −40 °F (−40 °C) in Bangor and Bath, Maine and Montpelier and White River, Vermont. In Connecticut, Hartford hit −27 °F (−33 °C) and New Haven −23 °F (−31 °C), and in Massachusetts, Williamstown hit −30 °F (−34 °C) and Pittsfield −32 °F (−36 °C), all low temperature marks that have never been matched since. In February, Savannah, Georgia the temperature hit 0 °F (−18 °C), 8 °F (4.4 °C) colder than would be reached during the 1899 cold wave later in the century and Charleston South Carolina hit 2 °F (−17 °C).

1836

- Last reported snowfall in Sydney, Australia occurred on 28 June of that year. British settlers in Hyde Park woke up to snow "nearly 1 in (2.5 cm) deep", with the meteorological table in The Sydney Herald recording that on the morning of the snow the temperature dropped to 3 °C (37 °F).

1857

- New England Cold wave of 1857. January 1857 was the coldest month ever recorded in New England. Average month temperatures of 16.7 °F (−8.5 °C) in New Haven, 16.8 °F (−8.4 °C) in Boston, and 19.6 °F (−6.9 °C) in New York City remain coldest months on record in those cities. The worst of the cold descended on New England on January 22 with January 23 being one of the coldest days known in the region. In Bath, Maine a temperature reading of −52 °F (−47 °C) and in Franconia, New Hampshire −51 °F (−46 °C) were recorded. In Norwich, Vermont −44 °F (−42 °C) was recorded. Boston suburbs of Malden and West Newton recorded −30 °F (−34 °C) overnight. Boston temperatures for January 23 never rose above 0 °F (−18 °C) all day and Nantucket Island was connected to the mainland by ice. In New York City, Erasmus Hall in Brooklyn reached a high of 0 °F during the day and the Hudson River froze over solidly enough for people to walk across to Hoboken.

1859

- January 1859: January 10 – coldest single daytime temperatures ever recorded experienced in New York City and in New England areas. Montreal recorded temperature of −43.6 °F (−42.0 °C) at 7 am, some 15 °F (8.3 °C) degrees lower than modern Montreal record of −29 °F (−34 °C) in 1933. Toronto recorded −27 °F (−33 °C) on the same day. At the University of Vermont in Burlington, −31.5 °F (−35.3 °C) was recorded at 7 am and −26 °F (−32 °C) at 2 pm. In Woodstock, Vermont a temperature of −45 °F (−43 °C) was recorded. Harvard College recorded −4.5 °F (−20.3 °C) at 2 pm and −18 °F (−28 °C) the next morning of January 11, the lowest known temperature reading recorded in Boston. Nantucket Island measured −12 °F (−24 °C), 6 °F (3.3 °C) colder than the modern known record. In New York City, recorded temperatures did not go above 0 °F (−18 °C). In Brooklyn Heights, a recorded reading of −9 °F (−23 °C) at noon and in Eramus Hall in Brooklyn recorded a high of −3.7 °F (−19.8 °C) at 7 am and −8 °F (−22 °C) at 9 pm that night. Union Hall in Jamaica Queens recorded −12 °F (−24 °C) at midnight between January 10 and 11. In White Plains, there were readings of −13 °F (−25 °C) at 7 am, −10 °F (−23 °C) at 2 pm, and −15 °F (−26 °C) at 9 pm.

1874–1875

- Winter 1874–1875 in Mid-Western United States.

1882–1883

- Winter 1882–1883 in United States.

1886–1887

- Winter of 1886–87 in the United States Great Plains and Upper Midwest.

1888

- 1888 US cold wave – A severe cold wave that passed through the Pacific Northwest. It led to a blizzard for the northern Plains and upper Mississippi valley where many children were trapped in schoolhouses where they froze to death.

1893

- 1893 East Asia Cold Wave – Produced snow in Hong Kong and South China, and freezing temperatures into tropical latitudes.
- 1893 Eastern United States Cold Wave.

1895

- February 1895 United States Cold Wave (Great Freeze) – Damaged citrus crops in Florida. A snowstorm produced unprecedented snowfall amounts along the Gulf Coast, including 22 inches (56 cm) in Houston, TX. Snow fell as far south as Tampico, Mexico, the lowest latitude in North America that snow has been recorded at sea level.
- Winter of 1894–95 in the United Kingdom.

1899

- February 1899 Cold Wave – Still ranked as number one cold wave outbreak in U.S. history to date.

=== 20th-century cold waves (1901–2000) ===
1904

- The winter of 1904 was the coolest year on record worldwide.

1912

- January 1912 cold wave – The severe 1912 United States cold wave caused the longest recorded period of weather below 0 °F or −17.8 °C.

1916–1917

- Winter of 1916–1917 – the "extended winter" (October to March) of 1916–17 was the coldest on record in the West and Midwest.

1917–1918

- Winter of 1917–1918 – The winter was very frigid across the East and created a heating fuel crisis equaled only in January 1977. Severe cold wave in December 1917 and January 1918 in northeast. December 30 set a number of record lows at the time in New York City (−13 °F, −25 °C) and Boston (−15 °F, −26 °C). Under ideal conditions for radiational cooling, including fresh snow cover and mostly clear skies, the morning of December 30, 1917, was exceptionally cold also in parts of Virginia and West Virginia, with all-time record cold temperatures (that stand until nowadays) recorded in many cities, including −37 °F (−38 °C) at Lewisburg (West Virginia state record), −34 °F (−37 °C) at White Sulphur Springs, West Virginia, −25 °F (−32 °C) at Bluefield, West Virginia, and −27 °F (−33 °C) at Blacksburg and Burke's Garden, Virginia. January 1918 also brought persistent well below average temperatures for many parts of the East and Midwest, with another shot of very cold air in early February (New York City Central Park's high of only 4 °F (−16 °C) on February 5 is a monthly record, while Michigan's Houghton Lake reached a low of −48 °F (−44 °C) on February 1). The Ohio River froze solidly along its entire length.
- This cold wave occurred not only in America but also East Asia. In Seoul, the weather was warm in early December 1917, but the temperature didn't go above (32 °F, 0 °C) during the cold wave from December 15–January 9. In addition, the temperature went lower than (14 °F, −10 °C) from December 15–31. The cold wave was especially fierce from December 26–27 and the low temperature on December 26 was (0.32 °F, −17.60 °C), while the high temperature was (9.86 °F, −12.30 °C). That day Incheon recorded a high temperature of (9.14 °F, −12.70 °C), this was the 3rd lowest high temperature recorded during winter. Also, the low temperature on December 27 was (−4.72 °F, −20.40 °C), this temperature is 2nd coldest temperature recorded in December in Seoul. (The lowest was (−9.58 °F, −23.10 °C) on December 31, 1927). The cold wave continued into January 1918, where it intensified. The low temperature on January 3 was (−7.24 °F, −21.80 °C). The temperature was a slightly warmer on January 14, but the weather was still quite cold, and the low temperatures were at (14 °F, −10 °C) or lower until January 28. Leading into February, this cold wave dissipated. Seoul had an average temperature of (21.74 °F, −5.70 °C) in December 1917, the lowest average recorded in December, and recorded an average temperature of (18.5 °F, −7.5 °C) in January 1918, the 6th lowest recorded in January.
- The cold wave also impacted North Korea, and the lowest temperature in Pyeongyang was (−11.74 °F, −24.30 °C) in December 1917. Also, the average temperature was (12.56 °F, −10.80 °C).)

1930

- A cold wave gripped the western United States in January 1930. Two inches of snow fell in Palm Springs, CA on January 11, one of only two times in the city's history that snow was ever observed.

1932

- Major cold outbreaks affected California in January, February and December. Up to two inches of snow fell across the Los Angeles Basin on January 15, and two inches of snow was officially recorded at the Downtown Los Angeles Weather Bureau Office. Snow also fell in San Francisco on three days in December 1932.

1933

- 1933 Western United States cold wave – The winter of 1932–33 was the second- or third-coldest on record in most of the West (the coldest on record in Arizona) and saw record cold temperatures in Seneca, Oregon (-54 °F/-48 °C), Moran, Wyoming (-66 °F/-54 °C) and Seminole, Texas (-23 °F/-31 °F) between February 7 and 10, when sixty deaths were blamed on extreme cold and ice storms.

1934

- February 1934 Cold Wave in New England and Eastern Canada – Longest period of cold weather ever experienced to this point. Average temperatures in upper New England and Eastern Canada were around zero degrees Fahrenheit for most of the month. Lake Ontario was reportedly completely frozen over. Temperatures reached above freezing only on one day in Burlington, VT in February.

1936

- 1936 North American cold wave – The cold wave of 1936 was the only cold wave of the 1930s to severely impact the United States east of the hundredth meridian. One of the coldest winters in the Great Plains on record. Low temperatures dropped below −50 °F (−46 °C) in Malta, Montana on four separate days and most of Montana averaged 20 degrees below normal for the entire month of February Parshall, North Dakota hit −60 °F (−51 °C) on February 15, still a record. Langdon, North Dakota remained below 0 °F (−18 °C) for 41 straight days from January 11 to February 20, the longest stretch in recorded history for the U.S. outside of Alaska. The cold wave was followed by one of the hottest summers on record, the 1936 North American heat wave.

1937

- 1937 Western United States cold wave – January 1937 was the coldest month on record in the West and saw snowfall as far south as the hot desert city of Yuma, Arizona, for one of only two occasions on record. California and Nevada saw their lowest temperatures on record: −45 °F (−42.8 °C) at Boca on January 20 and −50 °F (−45.6 °C) at San Jacinto on January 8.

1940

- January 1940 Southern United States cold wave – Late January saw record-breaking cold and snow across the Southern United States. It was the coldest month there since February 1899.

1941–1942

- Winter of 1941–42 in Eastern Europe – The winter of 1941–42 was the coldest of the twentieth century in most of Eastern Europe (e.g. Moscow) and was the last of a succession of abnormally cold winters there that affected the course of World War II.

1947

- Winter of 1946–47 in the United Kingdom
- February 1947 saw the coldest temperature on record in Canada, at -62.8 °C at Snag, Yukon.

1949

- January 1949 Western United States cold wave – The winter of 1948–49 was the coldest since 1891 over the Western United States and saw record snowfall, ice storms as far south as Texas, and constant disruptions to surface transport, along with large losses in livestock and crops. Coldest winter was recorded in many places in California, Nevada, Idaho and Washington state. The cold was also accompanied by severe blizzards which isolated Wyoming ranches and paralyzed the Great Basin region. The U.S. Army ran "Operation Hay Lift" in the region to bring food and hay by plane to isolated ranches in the region. Las Vegas Nevada got a record 16.7 in (420 mm) of snowfall during the month of January. Snow fell in both San Diego and Los Angeles on three days in January 1949. All-time record low of 0 °F in San Antonio, Texas.

1950

- 1950 Northwest North American cold wave – January 1950 saw unprecedented cold and snowfall in the Pacific Northwest, with normally mild Seattle and Portland, Oregon, both falling below 0 °F (−17.8 °C) and receiving extremely heavy snow that disrupted transport and schooling as it could not be removed easily. Western Canada saw by far its coldest month on record, leading to severe damage to fruit crops in the Okanagan Valley, the freezing of Okanagan Lake for the only time since 1862, and Calgary's only month where temperatures remained below 32 °F (0 °C) throughout. Vancouver, British Columbia, had an average temperature of −6.3 °C (20.7 °F), compared to the average 4.1 °C (39.4 °F).

1954–1955

- Winter of 1954–1955 in East Asia – One of the coldest winters on record across China. Numerous major rivers and lakes froze over across southern China, including the Huai River, Han River, and Dongting Lake.
- Between Late July and Early August 1955 the most intense cold wave ever recorded in Brazil was registered. It snowed heavily for over 24 hours in some cities of the south of the country, accumulating over 2 feet (60 cm) in the mountainous regions of Rio Grande do Sul and Santa Catarina states. The cold air reached the Amazon and even crossed the Equator, which is extremely rare. Temperatures plummeted to -10 °C (14 °F) in Bom Jesus, Rio Grande do Sul, and -2 °C (29 °F) in São Paulo (negative temperatures were never again recorded in the city center).

1956

- 1956 European cold wave – February 1956 was the coldest month of the twentieth century over large areas of Western Europe, with mean temperatures below 0 °C (32 °F) as far south as Marseille being utterly unprecedented in records dating back into the eighteenth century.

1962–1963

- Winter of 1962–63 in the United Kingdom – The winter of 1962–63 was the coldest for 223 years in England, and the freeze was accompanied by strong easterly winds and the freezing of rivers and streams.
- January 1963 cold wave in Mid-Western United States, as well as a brief-but-severe cold spell in the western United States.

1966

- 1966 Western Canadian cold wave – January 1966 was the coldest January on record in the Yukon and the coldest since 1950 or 1936 in the Prairie Provinces, and the severe cold continued into March, when Winnipeg recorded its most severe winter snowstorm on record.

1968–1969

- Winter of 1968–69 in Central Asia – Central Asia and western Siberia saw by far their coldest winter on record in 1968–69, and in Central Asia also their wettest, producing record low temperature, severe blizzards and avalanches, numerous plant deaths and record spring flooding. The cold occasionally swept into East Asia, resulting in record snowstorms and cold in China and Japan.
- 1969 Northwest North American cold wave – December 1968 and January 1969 saw record cold and snow in the Pacific Northwest and Southern BC. Vancouver, BC recorded its coldest temperature on record of −23.3 °C (−9.9 °F) on January 23, 1969, and −18.3 °C (−0.9 °F) at the airport on December 29, 1968. Seattle recorded its snowiest winter on record with 67.5 inches (171 cm) for the season at Sea-Tac Airport.

1975

- July 1975 was a historic month in South America. One of the most intense cold waves of the century climbed through the continent, even crossing the Equator in the Amazon Forest. On July 16, snow fell heavily in Argentina, and on the following day in Paraguay and Southern Brazil. In Curitiba it snowed for around 6 hours, accumulating on the ground, even in the city center. The phenomenon was registered in 5 states, a very rare occurrence. In July 18, the temperature dropped even more. In the state of Paraná, the coffee crops were killed by an episode of black frost (it occurs when the plants' tissues freeze and die), and some cities recorded -10 °C (14 °F), among the lowest temperatures ever recorded in the country. The cold wave reached as far as 10°N before dissipating.

1977

- Cold wave of January 1977. Greatest eastern US cold wave of the 20th century. The core of the cold air extended from New Hampshire to Florida and west to Iowa and Missouri. Ohio was at the very center of the cold air mass where every weather station there recorded its coldest month on record. Cincinnati recorded its lowest known temperature of −25 °F (−32 °C) dating back to 1820. The South Carolina state record temperature of −20 °F (−29 °C) was recorded during this cold wave near Long Creek. The wind chill in Minneapolis was −78 °F (−61 °C) on January 28, possibility the lowest ever recorded there up until that point. Snow fell in Miami and Homestead Florida, the farthest south snow was ever recorded in America. President Jimmy Carter walked in his inauguration parade in temperatures below freezing on January 20. Buffalo, New York was hit with its worst blizzard ever during the last week of January where near hurricane-force winds created whiteout conditions for three days. Temperatures in Buffalo were around 0 °F (−18 °C), wind chills recorded of −60 °F (−51 °C)using the old formula, and the blizzard paralyzed the city with snow drifts of up to 30 feet (9.1 m).

1978

- Cold wave of early 1978 – Produced one of the coldest winters on record in all states east of the Rockies, except Maine.
- Europe and Asia, winter of 1978–1979, caused by the Kara Sea 1978 anticyclone. Weather conditions typical for polar regions were detected in Moscow, Leningrad (St. Petersburg), and Sverdlovsk (Yekaterinburg), affecting logistics and the energy industry, and causing fires at the Beloyarskaya Nuclear powerplant. Freeze, but a lack of snow caused winter cereal crop failure throughout 1979.

1979

- Cold wave of 1979 – widespread cold across the United States. One of the largest Chicago snowstorms in history at the time, with 21 inches of snowfall in the two-day period, the 1979 Chicago Blizzard occurred during the cold wave in January.
- Late 1970s (1977, 1978, 1979) – In the last three years of the 1970s, almost all of the conterminous United States had at least one winter with a memorable cold wave, and the winter of 1978–79 was the coldest on record in the lower 48, with everywhere, except normally frigid upstate Maine, experiencing well below average temperatures.

1981–1982

- Winter of 1981/82 in the United Kingdom – This was a significantly colder than average winter. December started off very mild with temperatures up to 15 °C (59 °F), but it quickly became very cold and snowy. The night of the 12th–13th is particularly noted for its cold temperatures with many records broken. January 1982 was also a cold and snowy month with records being broken on the 10th in both England and Scotland. England recorded a record low of −26.1 °C (−15.0 °F) and down to −27.2 °C (−17.0 °F) in Braemar.
- January 1982 cold air outbreak – January 1982 was very cold. The 1981 AFC Championship Game, held in Cincinnati, was nicknamed the "Freezer Bowl" due to the −9 °F (−22.8 °C) temperature at kickoff and −59 °F (−50.6 °C) wind chill. The Sunday of the following week (January 17, 1982) is also known as Cold Sunday. Chicago's Midway and O'Hare airports record their all-time low temperatures of −26 °F (−32 °C). Milwaukee, Wisconsin recorded temperatures of −26 °F (−32 °C) on January 17, the lowest in 111 years there. Recorded temperature of −5 °F (−21 °C) in Atlanta and Jackson, Mississippi.

1983

- December 1983 Great Plains cold wave – The contiguous US had its coldest ever Christmas in 1983, except for the southwestern US. Severely cold winds blew in from Canada and about 70% of the month was colder than average. Many locations east of the Rockies broke December cold records on Christmas Eve. In addition to −23 °F (−30.6 °C) cold, the Sioux Falls area had 60 mph (97 km/h) winds bringing wind chills down to −70 °F (−56.7 °C). High temperatures did not even reach −10 °F (−23.3 °C) in northern Illinois during the days before Christmas. Temperatures dropped below 0 °F (−17.8 °C) on December 15 and remained there for over nine days at Sioux Falls. Minneapolis recorded an average temperature for the month of 3.7 °F (−15.7 °C), the coldest on record. In Chicago, a temperature of −23 °F (−30.6 °C) and 30 mph winds resulted in a wind chill of −82 °F (−63.3 °C) (−57 °F (−49.4 °C) under the new formula) on Christmas Eve.

1985–1986

- 1985 Great Western cold air outbreak – February 1985 saw the contiguous U.S.'s second-coldest temperature of −69 °F (−56.1 °C) in Peter Sinks, Utah. About a month of severe cold affected a large part of the nation. 1985 became the fourth-coldest calendar year on record in the Pacific Northwest.
- January 1985 – January 1985 was the coldest January since 1979 in the United Kingdom with significantly below-average temperatures.
- January 1985 US cold air outbreak – On January 21, 1985, it was so cold that President Ronald Reagan's inauguration took place in the Capitol Rotunda. In addition to the cold in Washington, D.C., Miami Beach recorded its only frost since records began, lasting for a full three hours. Several other Southern cities set all-time record cold.
- Winter of 1985/86 in the United Kingdom – The cold weather started in November 1985 with the month being considerably below average, being the coldest since at least 1925. December 1985 was a milder month and January was close to average. February was the coldest month since February 1947 in United Kingdom and it became the 5th coldest February in the CET records dating back to 1659.
- July 1986 – A polar blast in southeastern Australia brought sea level snow to the cities of Melbourne, Launceston and Hobart, with melting snow flurries even reported in parts of Sydney.

1987

- January 1987 Southeast England snowfall – This was a notably cold winter month for the United Kingdom and snowy too, especially so for the southeast with a very heavy lake-effect type snow event that affected the areas of East Anglia, south-east England and London between 11 and 14 January. It was the heaviest snowfall since 1981/82.
- March 1987 Greece cold wave - very rare cold air mass trapping phenomenon - The cold wave of March '87 lasted at least ten days in Athens and more in northern Greece according to weather reports and caused by a cold air mass that was trapped in the region of Greece after a high pressure system had been extended pushing trapped cold air from Russia.

1989

- February 1989 featured a significant, week-long cold wave across the Western United States. Major cities affected by the cold stretched from Seattle, WA to as far south as Los Angeles, CA. Las Vegas set a record low for February with 16 °F (−8.9 °C) degrees on February 7, 1989.
- December 1989 United States cold wave – In late 1989, the central and eastern United States saw one of the coldest Decembers on record. A white Christmas occurred.

1990–1991

- Winter of 1990–91 in Western Europe – This winter was noted for its effects especially on the United Kingdom and for two significantly heavy snowfalls which occurred in December 1990 and February 1991, such snowfalls would not be seen again until February 2009. The winter was the coldest since January 1987.
- December 1990 western United States – Extreme cold dropped down from Canada in the second half of December, causing record low temperatures up and down the West Coast, including one of California's most damaging freezes since 1949.

1994

- 1994 Northern US/Southern Canada cold outbreak – January 1994 was the coldest month ever recorded or since January 1977 or February 1934 over many parts of the northeast and north-central United States, plus adjacent southeastern Canada. Many overnight record lows were set. Cold outbreaks continued into February but the severity eased somewhat. Detroit, Michigan saw the city's coldest temperature since 1985.

1995

- 1995 White Earthquake in southern Chile – In August 1995 southern Chile was struck by a cold wave consisting of two successive cold fronts. Fodder scarcity caused a severe livestock starvation. Cows and sheep were also buried in snow. In parts of Tierra del Fuego up to 80% of the sheep died.
- December 1995 Great Britain cold wave – On the 30th of December the United Kingdom recorded a record low of −27.2 °C (−17.0 °F) in Altnaharra in Scotland equalling the record set on February 11, 1895, and January 10, 1982.

1996

- 1996 Great Midwest cold outbreak – Late January and early February was Northern Minnesota's coldest short-term period on record. The record low of −60 °F (−51.1 °C) was recorded in Tower, Minnesota. Cities like Minneapolis experienced temperatures near −35 °F (−37.2 °C).

1997

- 1997 Northern Plains cold air outbreak – Mid-January across the Northern U.S. was one of the windiest on record. With a low of around −40 °F (−40.0 °C) in some places, wind caused bitterly cold wind chills sometimes nearing −80 °F (−62.2 °C). Northern parts of North Dakota saw up to 90 inches (2.29 m) of snow. This was one of the most severe cold-air outbreaks of the 1990s.

2000

- July 2000 was one of the coldest months on record in South America. 4 streams of cold air pushed through the continent in a matter of 2 weeks, causing extremely low temperatures in many countries. Asunción registered -1 °C (31 °F), Buenos Aires (Ezeiza Airport) peaked at around -3 °C (27 °F), and in Brazil many cities recorded the lowest temperatures in many years. Curitiba had incredible 12 days of freezing temperatures, peaking at -4 °C (26 °F), and some areas of the southern states of Rio Grande do Sul and Santa Catarina reached -11 °C (14 °F). It also snowed heavily in these states. The cold front even reached the Amazon, with some cities in the southern part of the forest nearing temperatures of 10 °C (50 °F).

=== 21st-century cold waves (2001–present) ===
2002

- 2002 Cold wave in Greece January 4 - the first significant snowfall of 21st century in Athens, Greece occurred on January 4, lasted three days and caused major disruption to the city. The dense snowfall during midnight of January 5 left at least 15 cm of snow on the ground in downtown Athens, the northern suburbs of Athens received more than 50 cm.

2004–2005

- 2004 January cold outbreak, Northeast United States – New England was close to a record month when frequent Arctic fronts caused unusually cold weather. Boston had its coldest January since 1893 (19.7 °F, −6.8 °C), when it averaged 20.7 °F (−6.3 °C), and its lowest mean maximum at 27.2 °F (−2.7 °C). Virginia Beach had an unusually long period of below freezing weather. Some areas of northern New York saw 150 inches (3.81 m) of snow in a month. Many parts of the western and midwestern area of the country seen the effect as well.
- 2004 February cold wave in Greece on February 12 – coldest air mass to hit Greece in 21st century till today – a very cold air mass from the North Pole was pulled in eastern Europe because of a high-pressure system in west Scandinavia extended to south Europe, resulting in a low-pressure system in the Balkans. The cold snap finally moved south hitting Greece and caused ' record low temperatures, frozen rain phenomenon, thundersnow in Athens, snowfall that blanketed Crete island, snow that fell even in the most southern place of Greece in Gavdos Island. During midnight of February 13 temperature in Athens dropped so fast that resulted in a frozen rain that ice- capped all trees, followed by a rare thundersnow phenomenon dropping 25 cm of snow in central Athens and more than 50 cm in eastern suburbs. In the morning of February 13 was recorded the lowest temperature of 21st century in the center of Athens till today of -5 °C(23 °F) degrees(some meteorological stations east of downtown on higher altitude recorded -7 °C(19,4 °F) ) resulting in water supply disruption and residents had to activate boilers and water heaters in order to make the water running again.
- 2004–2005 Southern Europe cold wave – All areas of Southern Europe saw an unusually hard winter. This cold front caused snow in Algeria, which is extremely unusual. The south of Spain and Morocco also recorded freezing temperatures, and record freezing temperatures were observed in the north of Portugal and Spain.

2005–2006

- 2005–06 European cold wave – Eastern Europe and Russia saw a very cold winter. Some of them saw their coldest on record or since the 1970s. Snow was in abundance in unusual places, such as in southern Spain and Northern Africa. All the winter months that season saw temperatures well below average across the continent.

2007

- 2007 Northern Hemisphere cold wave – All of Canada and most of the United States underwent a freeze after a two-week warming that took place in late March and early April. Crops froze, wind picked up, and snow drizzled much of the United States. Some parts of Europe also experienced unusual cold winter-like temperatures, during that time.
- July 2007 Argentine winter storm – An interaction with an area of low pressure systems across Argentina during July 6, 7 and 8 of 2007, and the entry of a massive polar cold snap resulted in severe snowfalls and blizzards, and recorded temperatures below −32 °C (−26 °F). The cold snap advanced from the south towards the central zone of the country, continuing its displacement towards the north during Saturday, July 7. On Monday, July 9, the simultaneous presence of very cold air, gave place to the occurrence of snowfalls. This phenomenon left at least 23 people dead.

2008

- 2008 Alaska cold wave – In early February, Alaska experienced the coldest temperatures for eight years, with Fairbanks nearing −50 °F (−45.6 °C) and Chicken, Alaska, bottoming out at −72 °F (−57.8 °C), a mere eight °F (4.4 °C) away from the record of −80 °F (−62.2 °C). The first half of January also brought unusual cold weather and heavy snow to widespread regions of China and the Middle East, snowfall was present in Baghdad for the first time since the 1910s.
- 2008 Greece cold wave February 16 - most significant cold wave that lasted three days after 2002 - On February 14 a massive high pressure system between Greenland and Scandinavia extended from Arctic Ocean to west Mediterranean accompanied by a massive low pressure system in Siberia resulting in a cold air mass in eastern Europe reaching Greece on February 16. The cold air that moved over Aegean sea caused lake-effect snow dropping more than 40 cm of snow in Athens in the Chaidari district. In addition, it caused major disruption to the city and numerous flights were cancelled due to bad weather conditions.

2009–2010

- Early 2009 European Cold Wave – Early January gave most of Europe, especially in central and south very cold temperatures. Some places like Germany, France, Italy, Romania and Spain had record cold temperatures well below 0 °C (32 °F). Most of the places were covered in snow and ice which caused school closings and airport delays. Large cities like Paris, Madrid, Berlin and even Marseille saw very cold temperatures with much snow and ice in Northern Italy, most of Germany, in northern Portugal and even along the coasts of the Mediterranean. In early February another cold front brought heavy snowfall to much of Western Europe with the heaviest snow falling in France, Northern Italy, the Low Countries and the United Kingdom, where parts of Southern England had seen the worst snowfall in over eighteen years causing widespread travel disruption particularly around London.
- February 2009 Great Britain and Ireland snowfall – The February 2009 Great Britain and Ireland snowfall was a prolonged period of snowfall that began on 1 February 2009. Some areas experienced their largest snowfall levels in 18 years. Snow fell over much of Western Europe. The United Kingdom's Met Office and Ireland's Met Éireann issued severe weather warnings in anticipation of the snowfall. More than 30 centimetres (12 in) of snow fell on parts of the North Downs and over 20 centimetres (8 in) in parts of the London area. Such snow accumulation is uncommon in London. On the morning of 6 February the majority of Great Britain and Ireland had snow cover, with the area surrounding the Bristol Channel (South Wales (Cardiff area) and South West England (Bristol area)) being most affected – 55 centimetres (22 in) had settled overnight around Okehampton, Devon, South West England with similar depths in South Wales. In Ireland the highest totals were recorded around East Kildare and Wicklow County's were up to 11 inches (28 cm) fell around Naas, County Kildare and even more along the Wicklow Mountains. The last time such widespread snowfall affected Britain was in February 1991. On the 2nd a total of 32 centimetres (13 in) had fallen in Leatherhead, Surrey just south of the M25. Also 30 centimetres (12 in) had fallen over the South Downs and 26 centimetres (10 in) in higher areas of Brighton.
- 2009–10 European cold wave – At least ninety were confirmed dead after record low temperatures and heavy snowfall across Europe causes travel disruption to much of the continent including the British Isles, France, the Low Countries, Germany, Austria, Italy, Poland, the Baltic States, the Balkans, Ukraine and Russia. It was the coldest winter and longest cold spell for thirty years in the United Kingdom, whilst temperatures in the Italian Alpine peaks reached low to an extreme of −47 °C (−52.6 °F).

- The first snowfall began on 17 December 2009, before a respite over the Christmas period. The most severe snowy weather began on 5 January in North West England and west Scotland with temperatures hitting a low of −17.6 °C (0.3 °F) in Greater Manchester, England. The snow spread to Southern England on 6 January and by 7 January the United Kingdom was blanketed in snow, which was captured by NASA's Terra satellite. The thaw came a week later, as temperatures started to increase. The winter weather brought widespread transport disruption, school closures, power failures, the postponement of sporting events and 25 deaths. A low of −22.3 °C (−8.1 °F) was recorded in Altnaharra, Scotland on 8 January 2010. Overall it was the coldest winter since 1978–79, with a mean temperature of 1.5 °C (34.7 °F).
- Winter of 2009–10 in Great Britain and Ireland – The winter of 2009–10 in the United Kingdom (also called The Big Freeze by British media) was a meteorological event that started on 16 December 2009, as part of the severe winter weather in Europe. January 2010 was provisionally the coldest January since 1987 across the country. A persistent pattern of cold northerly and easterly winds brought cold, moist air to the United Kingdom with many snow showers, fronts and polar lows bringing snowy weather with it.
- A cold wave affected much of the Deep South in the United States and Florida in January and February 2010.

2010–2011

- Winter of 2010–11 in Great Britain and Ireland – This winter was referred to as The Big Freeze by national media in both United Kingdom and Ireland and it was the coldest winter in Britain for 31 years with an average temperature of 1.51 °C (34.72 °F). The UK had its second-coldest December on record, only behind December 1890, and is considered the coldest on record outside of England.
- 2011 New Zealand snowstorms- Caused by Antarctic storms moving upward, the whole country was affected briefly in July 2011, only for it to return even stronger in August for a prolonged period of time. Te Waipounamu/ The South Island was the hardest hit, although the generally more mild Te Ika-a-Maui/ The North Island was also affected to a large extent. Widespread and heavy snow fell in Wellington for the first time in twenty years, and in Auckland the first time since the 1930s. Despite this, the Kiwis, especially children, weren't disrupted by the snowstorms.

2012

- Early 2012 European cold wave – As of February 11, 2012, at least 590 people died during a cold snap with temperatures falling below −35 °C (−31 °F) in some regions. In Ukraine, over 100 deaths were attributed to the cold.

2013

- United Kingdom March–April 2013 – The UK Spring 2013 cold wave was a prolonged spell of cold weather which brought with it very heavy snowfalls, the worst in March for 30 years and since 1947 in some places. There was also some very cold temperatures with England (CET) having its coldest March since 1883 with a mean monthly temperature of 2.7 °C (36.9 °F). This meant that March was colder than all three winter months December 2012, January and February 2013.

- Spring 2013 North American cold wave – Although the core winter of 2012–13 was fairly mild, both March and April were unusually cold across the Midwest, resulting in sharp temperature contrasts from March 2012 to March 2013 all over the United States and Canada. This late cold wave was unexpected because February and March 2013 were both forecasted to be even milder and more springlike than February and March 2012, but instead turned out with a near-average February and an unusually cold March. This same cold wave extended well into the month of April, as four notable winter storms impacted much of the northern United States, especially across Minnesota and the Dakotas. Minnesota experienced a rare May snowstorm as a result of this cold wave.
- In July 2013, South America experienced the most intense cold wave in 13 years. Some coastal areas of Argentina and Uruguay had multiple days of nearly freezing temperatures, and snow fell throughout Southern Brazil, even being registered in Curitiba for the first time since 1988.
- 2013 Middle East cold snap - Cyprus, Egypt, Israel, West Bank, Jordan, Lebanon and Syria.

2013–2014

- December 2013 North American cold wave – On December 1, the weakening of the polar vortex resulted in the jet stream shifting southward, which allowed abnormally cold temperatures to intrude the Central United States. On December 6, a daily record snowfall of 0.1 inches (2.5 mm) was set in the Dallas–Fort Worth metroplex, breaking the old record of trace amounts of snow, set in 1950. The cold wave continued into December 10, before the temperatures returned to a more stable range.
- Early 2014 North American cold wave – On January 2–11, cold arctic air initially associated with a nor'easter invaded the central and eastern United States and Canada, east of the Rockies. Temperatures were even colder than the North Pole and the South Pole in many regions in the Upper Midwest and Canada. Temperatures reached as cold as −37 °F (−38 °C), and did not even get out of the negative double-digit temps in many places, including Chicago. The cold wave extended for a few more months, bringing a continuous pattern of record-low temperatures to most of the Central and upper eastern United States, before the pattern finally ended in early April.

2014–2015

- November 2014 North American cold wave – Between November 8 and November 23, a polar vortex similar to earlier in 2014 has a temporary comeback, delivering the 2014–15 winter season's first three significant winter storms in the United States. Snowfall records were confirmed all over the Midwest and the Northeast, especially around the Great Lakes. Buffalo, New York, was among the hardest hit in the unseasonably wintry November.
- February 2015 North American cold wave – During the second half of February 2015, temperature records were broken in both sides of the spectrum. Extreme warm records were broken in the western half of the United States and extreme cold records were broken in the eastern half. In addition to the extreme cold wave at its most brutal in the Great Lakes, Mid-Atlantic, and New England, snowfall was reported as far south as Tupelo, Mississippi; Huntsville, Alabama; and Shreveport, Louisiana. The cold wave became widespread and all the remaining mild conditions from the west were pushed into northern Mexico. The cold wave even extended well into early March, with a part of every U.S. state except Florida reporting a snow cover by March 1, 2015.

2016

- January 2016 East Asia cold wave – Caused over 100 known deaths across East Asia, South Asia and Southeast Asia.
- February 2016 North American cold snap – A cold wave hit North America during the second week of February 2016 which caused record-breaking wind chills and temperatures. New York City broke its record low of -1 °F (−18 °C), which was the first sub-zero reading for New York since January 19, 1994. On 13 February 2016, Whiteface Mountain underwent a record windchill of −114 °F (−81 °C), while in Boston, Massachusetts, the temperature dropped to −9 °F (−23 °C), the coldest since 1957.

2017

- April 2017 - Low temperatures were recorded in Sarajevo from an unusual snowfall that hit the city, disrupting the traffic since the 2012 cold wave.
- January 2017 European cold wave – A cold wave hit Central and East Europe on January 5. The lowest temperature was −45.4 °C (−49.7 °F) degrees. The cold caused at least 60 deaths. There was also massive snowfall.

2017–2018

- Cold wave of November 9–12, 2017. Record lows were broken from Minneapolis to Washington, D.C., as Arctic air swept through the areas.
- Cold wave starting late December 2017 (December 24 respectively), North America. A persistent wave of temperature extremes, including a cold wave, took place in Canada and the northeastern and central areas of the United States from Northern Canada to Mississippi, with temperatures in much of Canada of around −29 °C (−20 °F) and as low as −39 °C (−38 °F) in New York state, and as high as 21 °C (70 °F) and 31 °C (88 °F) in Sandberg and Los Angeles, respectively, in California.

2018

- Late February and early–mid March 2018, Europe. Easterly winds created bitter conditions, along with snow, twice during early spring 2018. Storm Emma, which affected southern areas of Great Britain, brought up to 50 centimetres (20 in) of snow. Overall, 93 people across Europe died; 27 deaths occurred in Poland and 17 in the UK.
- Around early December 2018, some cold waves hit Central Russia and Kazakhstan, bringing temperatures several degrees down from the average. Big cities like Novosibirsk, Krasnoyarsk, Omsk, Irkutsk, and Barnaul had experienced temperatures of -10 C or lower. The cold wave dissipated in mid-December, but returned close to Christmas, impacting Central Russia and Kazakhstan strongly again, before finally dissipating around New Year's Eve. The lowest temperature, −52.5 °C (−62.5 °F) happened in Yerbogachen on Christmas.

2019

- In late January, an extreme cold wave hit Canada and the midwest of the United States, bringing temperatures below −30.0 °C (−22.0 °F), with all-time record lows set in several cities. New York City had a low temperature of 2 °F (-16 °C), the coldest reading in Central Park since February 14, 2016, when the mercury dropped to -1 °F (-18 °C), the coldest sub-zero reading in New York City since January 19, 1994.
- February 2019: Brought temperatures 10~15 degrees lower than the February average lows, and temperatures of −40 °C (−40 °F) degrees to many parts of Siberia again. Novosibirsk, the largest city in Asian Russia, lowered to −40.1 °C (−40.2 °F) on 2 February, just a fraction of a degree shy to its previous record in 1977. Krasnoyarsk also lowered to −41.3 °C (−42.3 °F) on 4 February, missing just 0.3 °C to its record in 2001. Irkutsk Oblast had also recorded very low temperatures, with Irkutsk hitting −37.7 °C (−35.9 °F) on 6 February, beating its previous record of 6 February, Bratsk has seen temperatures below −41.5 °C (−42.7 °F) on February 5, which is sometimes colder than cities like Yakutsk. 7 and 8 February was even more brutal, with Omsk as low as −39.0 °C (−38.2 °F), and a merciless record low −41.9 °C (−43.4 °F) in Novokuznetsk, just 0.3 °C short of the record low in 1969. Lowest temperature in the cold wave of −53.6 °C (−64.5 °F) was recorded in Vanavara The cold wave also lightly affected the Russian Far East and some parts North America. California experienced an unusually wet and cold February, where Los Angeles experienced its coldest February since 1962.
- November 2019: North American cold wave
- November 2019: Turkish cold wave

2020

- February 2020: 2nd time snow falls in Baghdad since the 1910s.
- October 2020: The Rocky Mountains and Great Plains of the United States experienced record-cold temperatures. Subzero Fahrenheit temperatures (< -18 °C) were recorded in Montana, Wyoming, Colorado, and Nebraska. Bozeman, Montana, reached −20 °F (−29 °C) and Denver, Colorado reached 4 °F (−16 °C).

2021

- January 2021: Severe cold wave hit many regions in Eurasia, especially in the Iberian Peninsula, Central Asia, South Asia, East Asia and Southeast Asia with some of the lowest temperatures in many years. In Spain, Clot del Tuc de la Llança in Catalonia in the Spanish Pyrenees recorded −34.1 °C on January 6. It was not only the new national lowest temperature record in Spain, 2 °C lower than the previous record in 1956, but also the lowest temperature in the whole Iberian Peninsula ever recorded. On 9 January another new record was attained with -35.6 °C in Vega de Liordes, in the Cantabrian mountains of Spain. The cold wave was concurrent with a historic snowstorm which covered Madrid under 50 to 60 cm of snow, the first time since 1971. Novosibirsk reached a low of -41 °C. Beijing recorded a low of -19.6 °C which was the coldest since 1966. Seoul also recorded -18.6 °C in January 8 which was the tie record with 2001 and the coldest since 1986. Over 200 cm of snow fell in western Japan along the Japan Sea coast.
- February 2021: Turkish cold wave
- February 2021: February 2021 North American cold wave
- May 2021: Sydney CBD recorded its coldest stretch of May days in 54 years due to a polar blast that swept across Australia's southeast, which kept the temperatures below 9 °C (48 °F) in the early mornings for five consecutive nights, in addition to the inland suburbs of Sydney dipping down to 1 °C (34 °F) in Camden and 5 °C (41 °F) in Sydney Olympic Park.
- June 2021, Sydney CBD had its coldest day since 1984 and the coldest June day since 1899, where it reached a maximum of just 10.3 °C (50.5 °F). Bankstown, a western suburb, only reached 9.7 °C (49.5 °F), its coldest day in 50 years, with nearby suburbs registering a similar temperature. These unusually cold maximums were caused by a cut-off low.

2022

- February-March 2022: Turkish cold wave
- May 2022: 2022 South American cold wave
- June 2022: Aysén Region in southern Chile experienced unusually cold temperatures. In numerous locations, temperatures dropped below -10 C. In one case it reached -14 C. Parts of Tortel Fjord and Simpson River froze. In Los Lagos Region, north of Aysén Region, temperatures of -5 C were registered.
- December 2022: Late December 2022 North American winter storm
- December 2022: December 2022 United Kingdom cold wave - A relatively short-lived but significant cold spell that brought some of the lowest temperatures recorded in the United Kingdom since the winter 2010-11.

2023

- February 2023: February 2023 North American cold wave

2024

- January 2024: Mid-January 2024 North American Cold Wave - Freezing temperatures affected campaign events leading up to the Iowa Caucuses on January 15 had affected turnout in the first contest in the 2024 presidential primaries and caucuses. In addition, the cold temperatures resulted in the 4th coldest NFL game on record between the Kansas City Chiefs and Miami Dolphins, with kickoff temperature being −4 °F (−20 °C). 15 people were hospitalized due to the cold temperatures during the game. Wind chills following the storm reached as low as −60 °F (−51 °C) in Montana, and wind chills were still −9 °F (−23 °C) as far south as Dallas on January 14. On January 13, Dillon, Montana reached an all time record low of −42 °F (−41 °C), while Bozeman, Montana recorded their second coldest temperature at −45 °F (−43 °C). That same day, Dickinson, North Dakota reached a −70 °F (−57 °C) wind chill, their coldest since the wind chill formula was updated in 2001, and a −33 °F (−36 °C) air temperature, a daily record and their coldest temperature since 1990. On January 16, Houston dropped to a daily record low of 19 °F (−7 °C). Despite these events, the winter season in North America turned out to be the warmest on record for many regions.

2025

- January 2025: January 2025 North American cold wave, brought well below average temperatures to the Lower 48 United States throughout most of January 2025. On January 20, U.S. president Donald Trump had moved his inauguration indoors due to the freezing temperatures outside.
- January 2025: January 2025 British Isles cold wave brought well below freezing temperatures across the United Kingdom, especially in Scotland where some areas reached about −20 °C (−4 °F). The Met office issued yellow warnings for both ice and snow, and a health warning was issued due to the cold temperatures.

2025–2026

- The winter of 2025-2026 was among the coldest in more than a decade in parts of Europe. Two cold waves and heavy snowfall hit the British Isles starting from mid-to-late November, and Ukraine's capital Kyiv recorded an uninterrupted snow cover for 63 days between 27 December and 27 February, the longest uninterrupted period under snow since the winter of 2010-2011.
- January–February 2026 North American cold wave, Brought bitterly cold temperatures to much of the North American continent, particularly the Eastern United States in late January and early February of 2026.

== See also ==
- Arctic dipole anomaly
- River Thames frost fairs
- Polar front
- Polar vortex
- Siberian Express
- Snow in Florida
- Volcanic winter
- Winter of 2010–11 in Europe
- Zud
