= 1994 North American cold wave =

Weather event

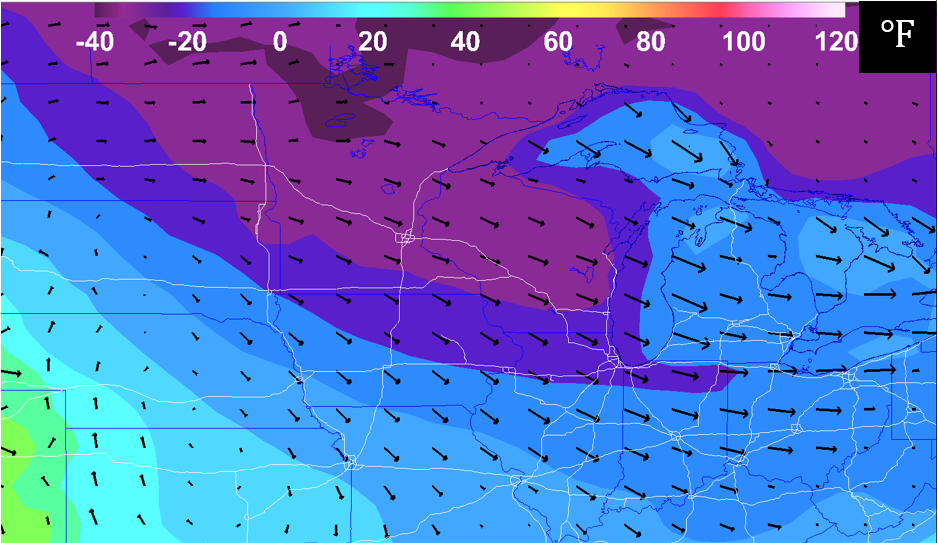
- MERRA-2 reanalysis over the Upper Midwest showing 2-meter temperatures and wind vectors on January 18, 1994, at 1 pm EST (temperatures in Fahrenheit)

Meteorological history
- Formed: January 13, 1994
- Dissipated: January 23, 1994

Cold wave
- Lowest temp: −50 °F (−46 °C) in Amasa, MI, on Jan 19

Overall effects
- Fatalities: 100+
- Areas affected: United States and Canada

The 1994 North American cold wave occurred over the midwestern and eastern regions of the United States and southern Canada in January 1994. The cold wave caused over 100 deaths in the United States. Two notable cold air events took place from January 18–19 and January 21–22. There were 67 minimum temperature records set on January 19. During this time, much of the United States experienced its coldest temperatures since a major storm on February 20, 1934.

== Meteorological synopsis ==
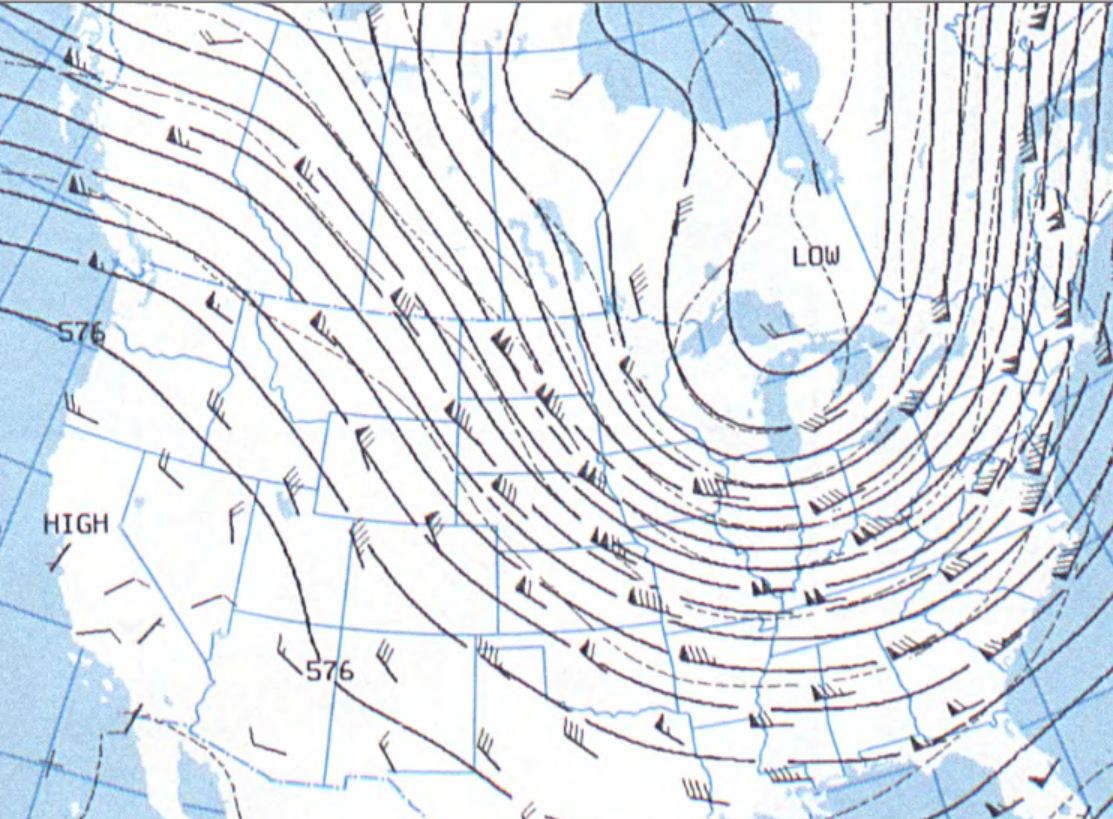
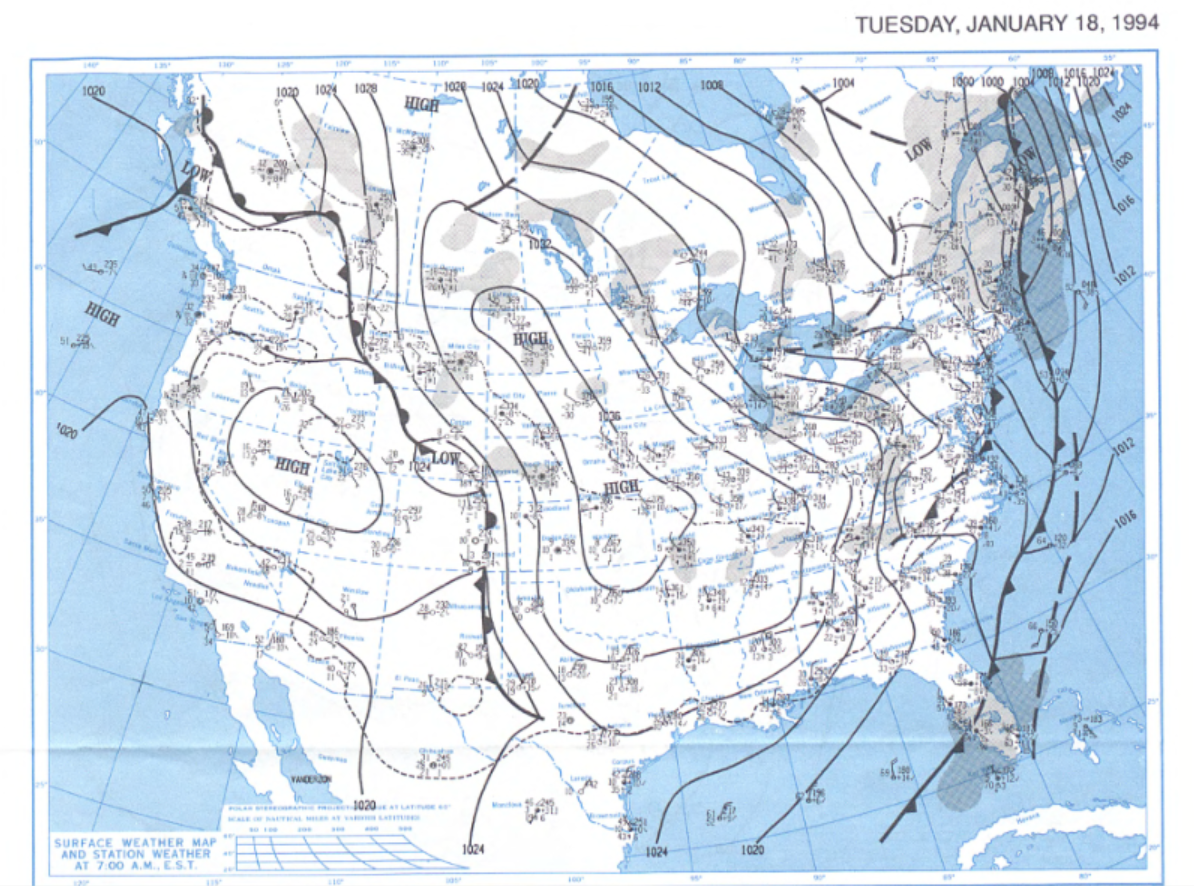
Maps of 500 mbar height contours (top) and surface analysis (bottom) on January 18, 1994, 7 am EST

Cold air outbreaks are characterized by strong upper-level troughs in the atmosphere, with ridges usually located up and downstream. On January 17, 1994, the 500 millibar (mb) height contours showed the low-pressure center was situated near the border of Ontario and Manitoba, just north of Minnesota, with the trough axis stretching down into the Upper Midwest. The 500 mb height contours on January 18 showed the strong trough over the Great Lakes region extending southward that brought cold air down from the North Pole. MERRA-2 reanalysis detailed the cold air funneling into the Upper Midwest from Canada on January 18, with strong winds out of the northwest. The surface analysis map on January 18 showed a low-level ridge over the Upper Midwest and surface winds blowing out of the northwest. The surface anticyclones on January 18 and 21 both exceeded 1,040 mbar (104 kPa) and moved to the southeast, bringing cold air to much of the eastern half of the United States. By January 19, the upper levels showed a retreat of the low-pressure center, however, shortwave troughs were still located near the United States, and surface temperature effects with the strong anticyclone were felt for days to come.

Snow was associated with this cold weather in many regions. From January 17–18, a snowstorm affected areas from the Ozarks to New England. Ice affected most of the Mid-Atlantic region. Accumulations of sleet and freezing rain in New York City were in excess of an inch.

== Weather records ==
=== Canada ===
January 1994 was a month of extremes in Canada. Temperatures in the Yukon approached −50 °C (−58 °F). In Yellowknife, Northwest Territories, the temperature did not exceed −40 °C (−40 °F) for many days. In Windsor, Ontario, the coldest temperature since 1885 was recorded on January 19 at −29 °C (−20 °F). On January 16, Scarborough, Ontario, recorded an all-time record low temperature of −35.2 °C (−31.4 °F), several degrees colder than the official coldest record for Toronto, which now includes Scarborough. Toronto recorded its coldest January on record with −12.4 °C (9.7 °F) at the airport.

The cold air was also accompanied by large snowfalls. The western side of Lake Ontario saw 50 centimeters (20 inches). Rapid melting and freezing near the end of January caused Toronto Pearson International Airport to close for the first time in 60 years. Water shortages were also common in Goose Bay, Labrador, due to extreme temperatures.

=== Northeastern US ===
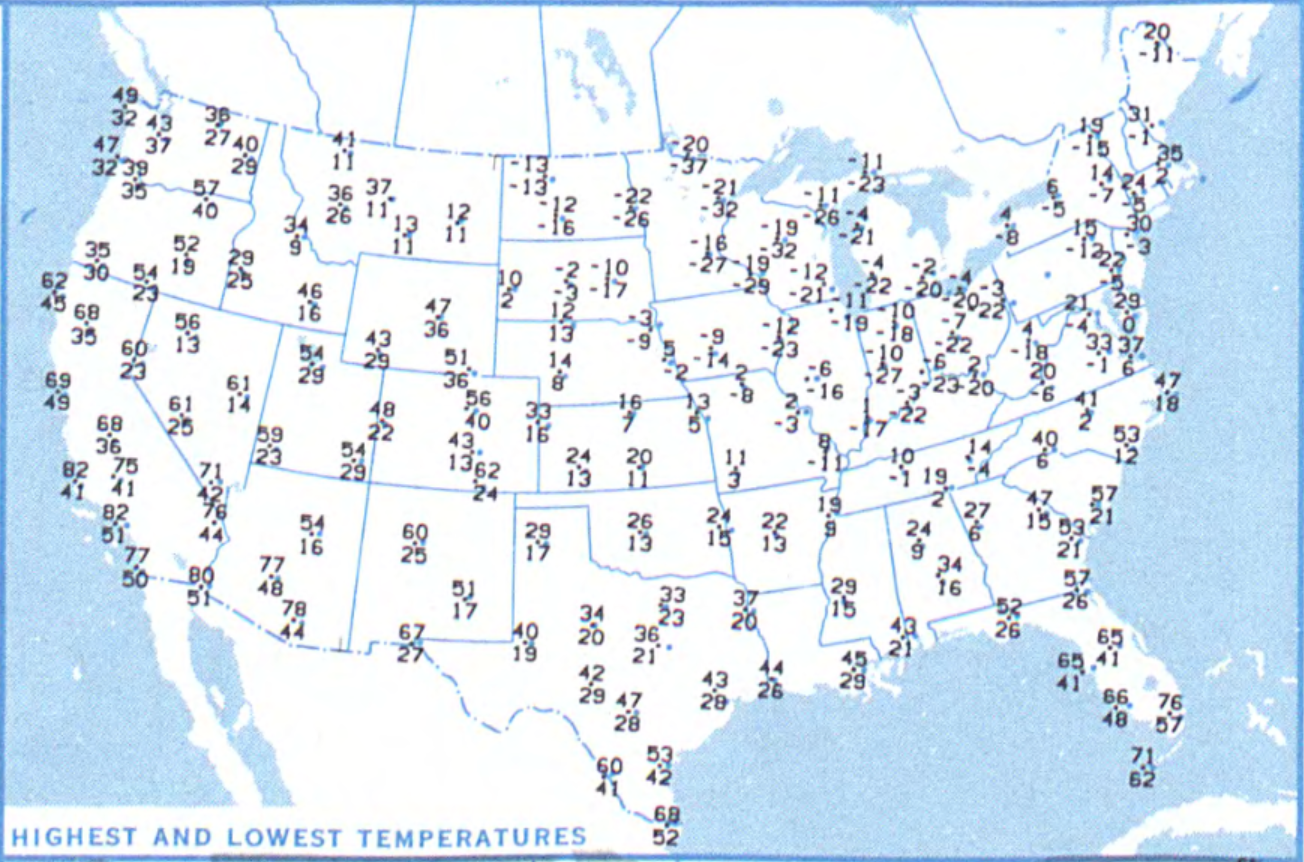
Maximum temperatures from 7 am to 7 pm EST on January 18, 1994, with minimum temperatures from 7 pm to 7 am EST on January 19, 1994 (°F)

On January 16, the Watertown, New York, International Airport set an all-time record low of −43 °F (−42 °C), while Watertown observed its coldest January on record, (Note: Records date to 1893.) with a mean temperature of 5.39 °F (−14.78 °C). The Syracuse, New York, Hancock International Airport recorded a monthly mean temperature of 12.6 °F (−10.8 °C), a record low for January.

The lowest temperature seen in Sussex County, New Jersey, was −26 °F (−32.2 °C) on January 21, 1994.

Washington National Airport (later renamed Ronald Reagan Washington National Airport) had a new record-low maximum temperature for the 20th century of 8 °F (−13.3 °C).

Maine had its coldest month since February 1934 and its coldest January since 1920. It was Maine's coldest winter since 1970–71, New Hampshire's since 1976–77, and Vermont's since 1958–59.

Erie, Pennsylvania, hit −18 °F (−27.8 °C), a record at that time. Pittsburgh saw its record-low temperature of −22 °F (−30 °C) on January 19.

=== Midwestern US ===
Indiana set state records on January 19. On January 19, the temperature in New Whiteland, Indiana, dropped to −36 °F (−37.8 °C), the record-lowest temperature in the state. In Indianapolis, temperatures plunged to a new record low of −27 °F (−32.8 °C), refreshing the record low set in December 1989 at −23 °F (−30.6 °C) and the January record low of −22 °F (−30.0 °C) set in 1985.

Cincinnati, Ohio, reached a temperature of −24 °F (−31.1 °C), just one degree short of the record low. Columbus saw a record −22 °F (−30.0 °C), and Cleveland reached a record of −20 °F (−28.9 °C). Akron set a record-low temperature at −25 °F (−32 °C).

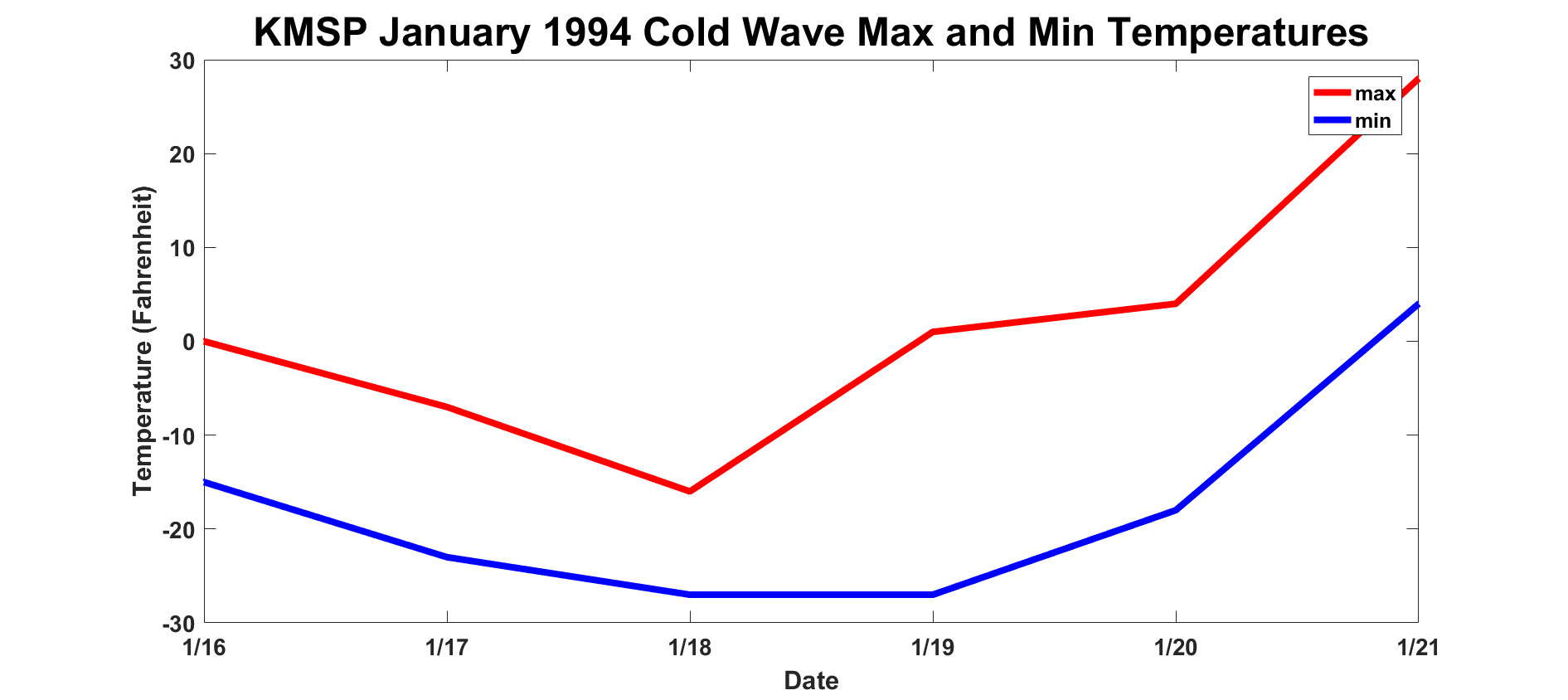
Maximum and Minimum Daily Temperatures at Minneapolis–St. Paul International Airport during the cold wave.

Minneapolis–Saint Paul was one of the areas that felt major impacts from the cold wave. For 142 continuous hours during January 13–19, the temperature recorded at Minneapolis–Saint Paul International Airport stayed at or below zero. This was the sixth-longest stretch on record from 1873 to 2014. Governor Arne Carlson closed all public schools in Minnesota on January 18, with wind chills of −48 °F (−44 °C) and morning air temperatures of −26 °F (−32 °C). On January 6–7, 1994, Lake County, Minnesota, set records for the largest snow in one day as well as the most snow in one storm.

Chicago, Illinois, reached −21 °F (−29.4 °C) with wind chills of around −55 °F (−48.3 °C), with suburbs in the then 9 Million Metro Area reaching nearly -30. The coldest day of the 1990s in Chicago by far. Almost all primary and secondary schools in Chicago were closed that day. Richard Daley, then mayor of Chicago advised residents not to go outside if they don't have to. Nearly all schools in the area were closed and four people in Cook County, Illinois, died from hypothermia. Hundreds of drivers per hour complained to the AAA-Chicago Motor Club about dead automobile batteries, fuel injectors being too cold and other vehicle issues and United Airlines canceled almost half of its flights. Multiple complaints were raised about lack of power due to severed electricity lines and water companies stopped water supply to homes due to pipe explosions. Many apartment renters complained to Cook County about insufficient heat.

=== Southern US ===
Kentucky set state records on January 19. The minimum record temperature in Kentucky was −37 °F (−38.3 °C) in Shelbyville on that day. A single-storm snowfall record was set in Louisville, Kentucky, with 16 inches (410 mm) of snow recorded.

== In popular culture ==
The meteorological event was dramatized in the 2024 film Ordinary Angels. Directed by Jon Gunn and starring Hilary Swank, the film tells the true story of Louisville residents teaming up to shovel a path for Ed Schmitt (Alan Ritchson) so that he could drive his ill daughter, Michelle, to the hospital for a liver transplant. The film premiered on February 23, 2024, 30 years and 1 month after the dissipation of the actual cold wave.
