= 2022 South American cold wave =

Weather event in South America

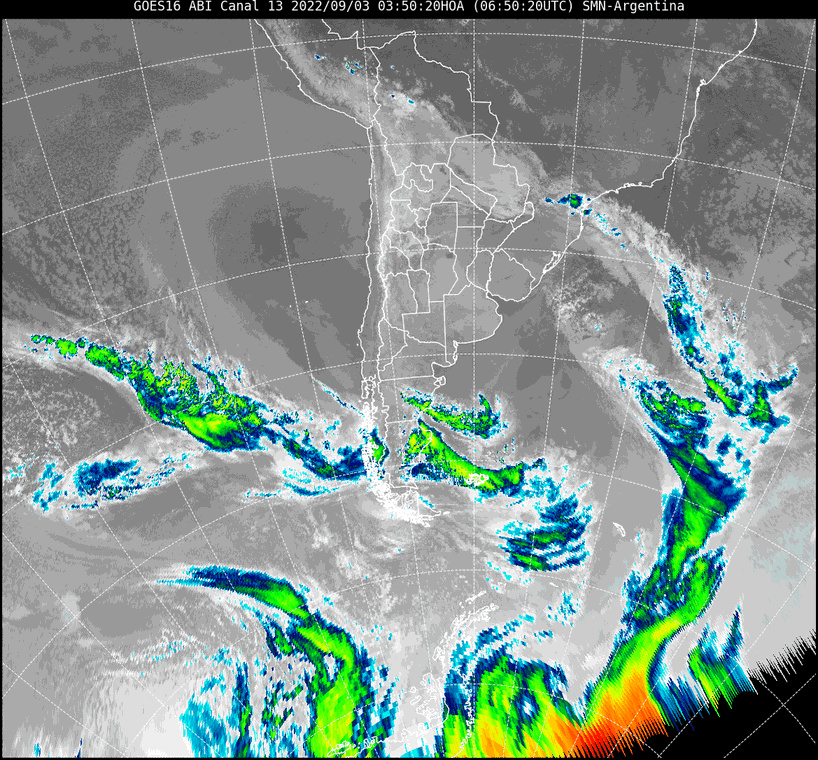
- Polar winds coming from Antarctica in South America

Meteorological history
- Formed: May 2022
- Dissipated: November 2022

Overall effects
- Fatalities: 37
- Areas affected: Argentina, Bolivia, Brazil, Chile, Colombia, Ecuador, Paraguay, Peru, Uruguay

The 2022 South American cold wave refers to a series of cold temperatures and non-consecutive drops in temperature that had been recorded from May to November 2022.

At least 37 deaths have been registered due to the cold wave: 18 in Bolivia, 11 in Argentina, 5 in Peru, two in Uruguay and one in Paraguay.

== Origin ==
It was recorded that the first cold waves originated from Subtropical Storm Yakecan in May, which mainly impacted eastern Brazil. According to France24, the wave was influenced by global warming by unbalancing the air masses.

== By country ==
=== Argentina ===
Servicio Meteorológico Nacional announced that the cold wave had begun in Argentina on June 21 through its official Twitter account. By 30 May, the City of Buenos Aires registered a relevant drop in temperature, the SMN said that the wave "advanced from Patagonia to the central zone of the country, and when combined with nights of little cloudiness, favored values of low temperatures and frosts." in a large part of the Pampas and Cuyo region. The SNM also stated that in some Argentine provinces there would be drizzle and hail in less than -10°.

In August 2022, another significant drop in temperature was recorded, from 18 °C (64 °F) in the afternoon to 0 °C (32 °F) in the early morning.

=== Bolivia ===
Bolivia felt the presence of the wave in June in the western departments, the Bolivian Senamhi reported that the cold wave would mainly hit western Bolivia. On 1 June, the city of El Alto registered −9.8 °C (14.4 °F), the lowest temperature recorded in Bolivia in 24 years.

=== Brazil ===
The cold wave was registered in June, in the states of São Paulo and Rio de Janeiro, a cold wave coming from the south, the temperature did not exceed 5 °C (41 °F), the cold wave was also present in the central zone of Brazil.

=== Chile ===
The Chilean Meteorological Directorate said in May that the regions of Araucanía and Ñuble would present up to −7 °C (19 °F) in their low areas, the area between the regions of Valparaíso and Biobío were also affected by the drop in temperature as well as the Santiago Metropolitan Region, which was reduced to −4 °C (25 °F). The Chilean government applied the Blue Code to safeguard the homeless against the cold snap, the code has been active ever since. Researchers from the University of Talca carried out a study that stated that the cold wave would expand throughout 2022, affecting crops through frost.

=== Colombia ===
In January, the Regional Autonomous Corporation of Valle del Cauca had already predicted that a cold wave would come in the Colombian Pacific even though it was still the dry season. In February, the Institute of Hydrology, Meteorology and Environmental Studies (Ideam) reported that the temperature would reach 3–4 °C (37–39 °F) in Bogotá at dawn. The cyclones of June 2022 contributed to the Colombian cold.

=== Ecuador ===
In Ecuador, an abnormal drop in temperature was registered in June in the coastal provinces, according to the Institute of Hydrology and Meteorology (Inamhi), according to the Ecuadorian government institute, this climate was caused by the factors of the trade winds and the La Niña phenomenon. In early July, the cold wave in Cuenca and Loja was accompanied by rain.

=== Paraguay ===
The Paraguayan Directorate of Meteorology and Hydrology (DMH) said that in June temperatures would be around 1–3 °C (34–37 °F) in the eastern region, while in the western region it would be around 4 °C (39 °F).

=== Peru ===
The cold wave was present with the death of five indigenous infants from the Río Tambo District in the center of the country. On 29 August, the city of Lima suffered the coldest day after sixty years, presenting a temperature drop from 16 °C (61 °F) to 3.2 °C (37.8 °F). Since 30 August, metropolitan Lima is considered to be suffering a cold wave, according to the National Meteorology and Hydrology Service of Peru (SENAMHI).

SENAMHI indicated that the cold wave seriously affects rice crops in the country.

=== Uruguay ===
The Uruguayan Institute of Meteorology issued an alert on 30 May for the arrival of the cold wave in "the southwest, center, east and northeast" of Uruguay due to the drop in temperatures to −7 °C (19 °F).

== Repercussions ==
The Pan American Health Organization reported that the cold wave was causing an increase in flu cases, especially in the Southern Cone, and that these were not being treated as they should be, being confused with COVID-19 cases. The Uruguayan government applied the so-called Departmental Emergency Coordination Centers (Cecoed) in June to attend to emergencies due to the increase in polar cold.
