= December 1989 United States cold wave =

Weather event in the United States

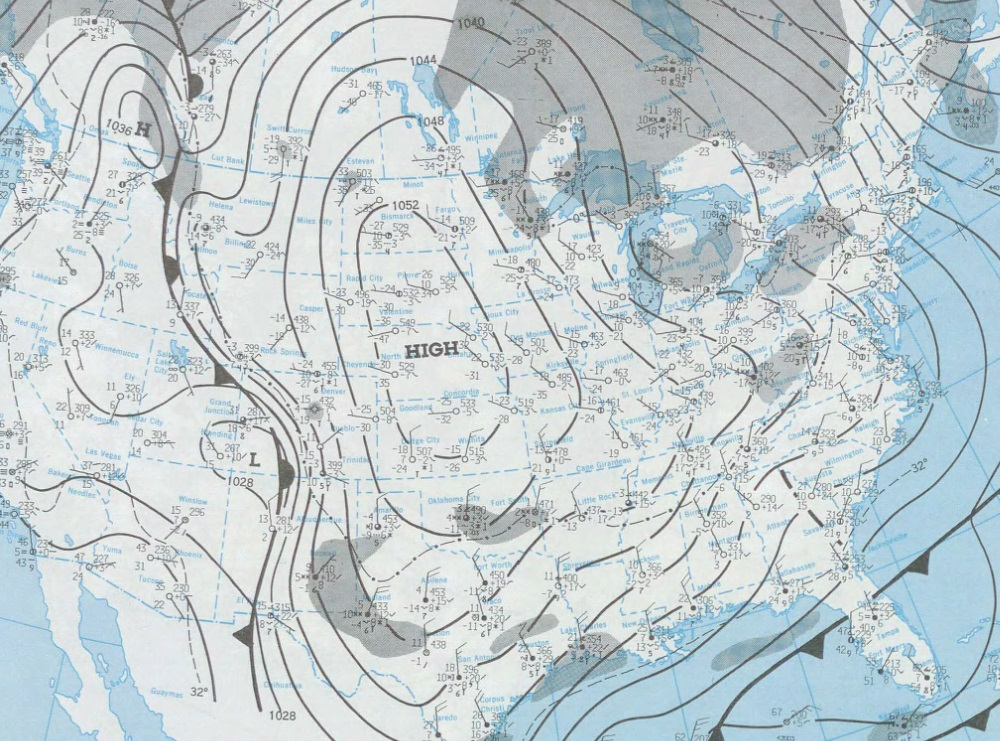
- Atmospheric pressure map on the morning of December 22, 1989

Meteorological history
- Formed: December 1989
- Dissipated: December 1989

Cold wave

Overall effects
- Areas affected: United States

The December 1989 United States cold wave was a series of cold waves into the central and eastern United States from mid-December 1989 through Christmas. On December 21–23, a massive high pressure area pushed many areas into record lows. On the morning of the 22nd, Scottsbluff, Nebraska, experienced −42 °F (−41 °C). The next morning, the front pushed temperatures in Houston down to 7 °F (−14 °C), the 2nd coldest since 1889. On the 24th Miami airport (inland) had a low of 31 °F (−1 °C), and on the 25th, the low was 30 °F (−1 °C), and Key West had its 4th lowest temperature on record with a low of 44 °F (7 °C). The wave extended all the way into Mexico's Lower Rio Grande Valley, resulting in tens of millions of dollars in damage to the agricultural sector. The December cold wave was actually the second of the year, after a February cold wave had extended into Texas.

An area of low pressure moving northeast from Florida interacted with the cold front to create the Christmas Coastal Snowstorm on December 22–24, the largest snowstorm ever in the southeast United States. All-time snow records were broken in Wilmington, North Carolina (15.3 inches (39 cm)), Cape Hatteras (13.3 inches (34 cm)), Charleston, South Carolina (8.0 inches (20 cm)), and Savannah, Georgia (3.6 inches (9.1 cm)). A snowfall of 0.8 inches (2.0 cm) was measured at Jacksonville and a trace of snow was reported in Tallahassee, and snow flurries were seen in the air as far south as Tampa and Sarasota.

== Description ==
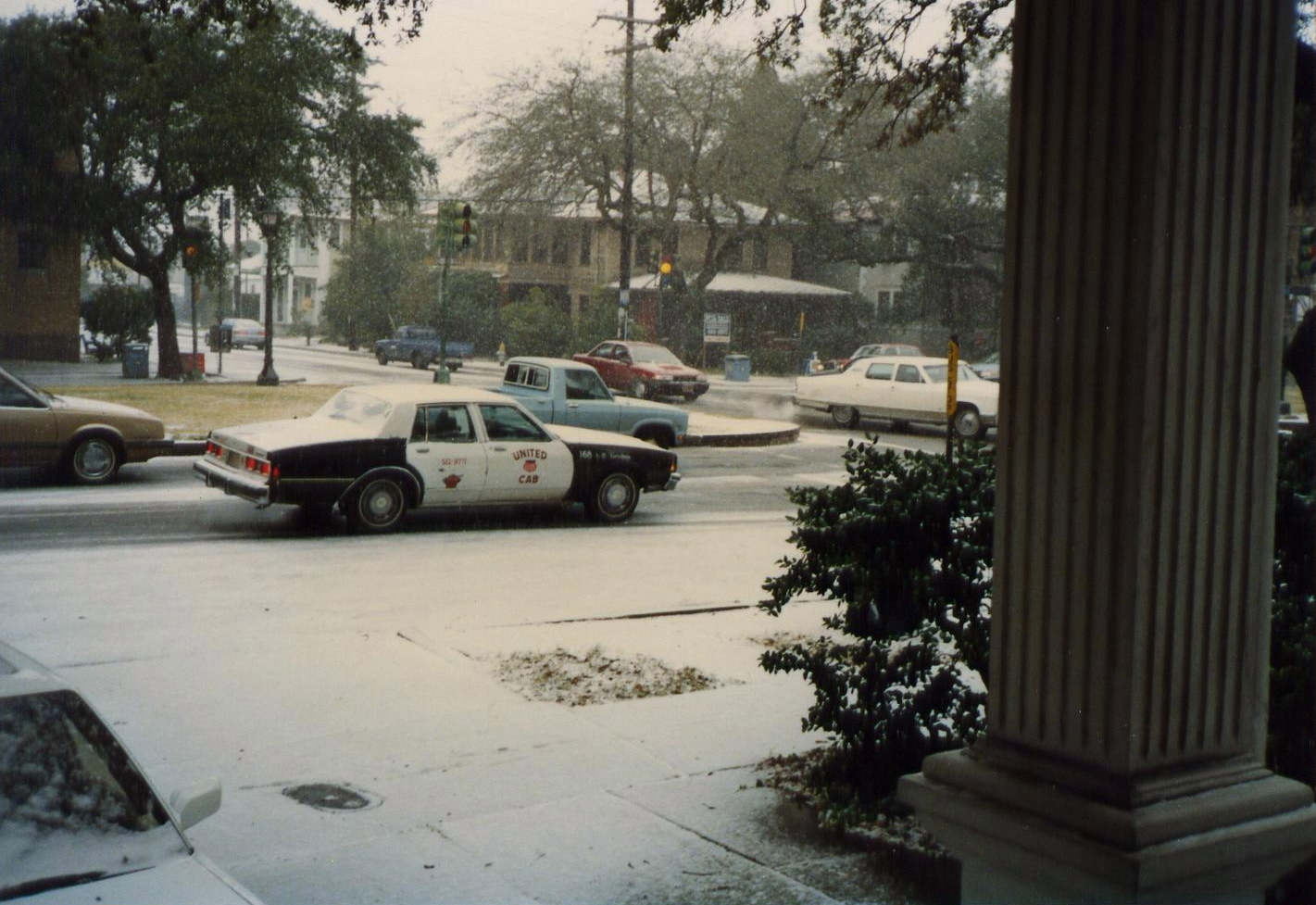
Snow in New Orleans, Louisiana

Many locations experienced monthly or all-time record lows, and freezing temperatures destroyed much of the citrus crop in south Texas and Florida.

=== Texas ===
December 1989 set monthly record lows for Houston, Galveston, and College Station. Brownsville, Texas fell to 16 °F (−9 °C) and temperatures on the upper coast fell into the single digits. Dallas-Fort Worth had 295 consecutive hours of freezing temperatures ending on December 30, with a record low average monthly temperature of 34.8 °F (1.6 °C) and a low of 5 °F (−15 °C) on December 22. Broken water pipes in Dallas resulted in $25 million in damage and large disruptions to the local manufacturing industry. Houston Intercontinental Airport set a record low of 7 °F (−14 °C) on December 22, as well as experiencing 1.7 in (4.3 cm) of snow.

An estimated six million fish died in Texan bays from the freeze. The toll would have been higher if 11.3 million fish had not already died in the February cold wave earlier in the year.

=== Florida ===
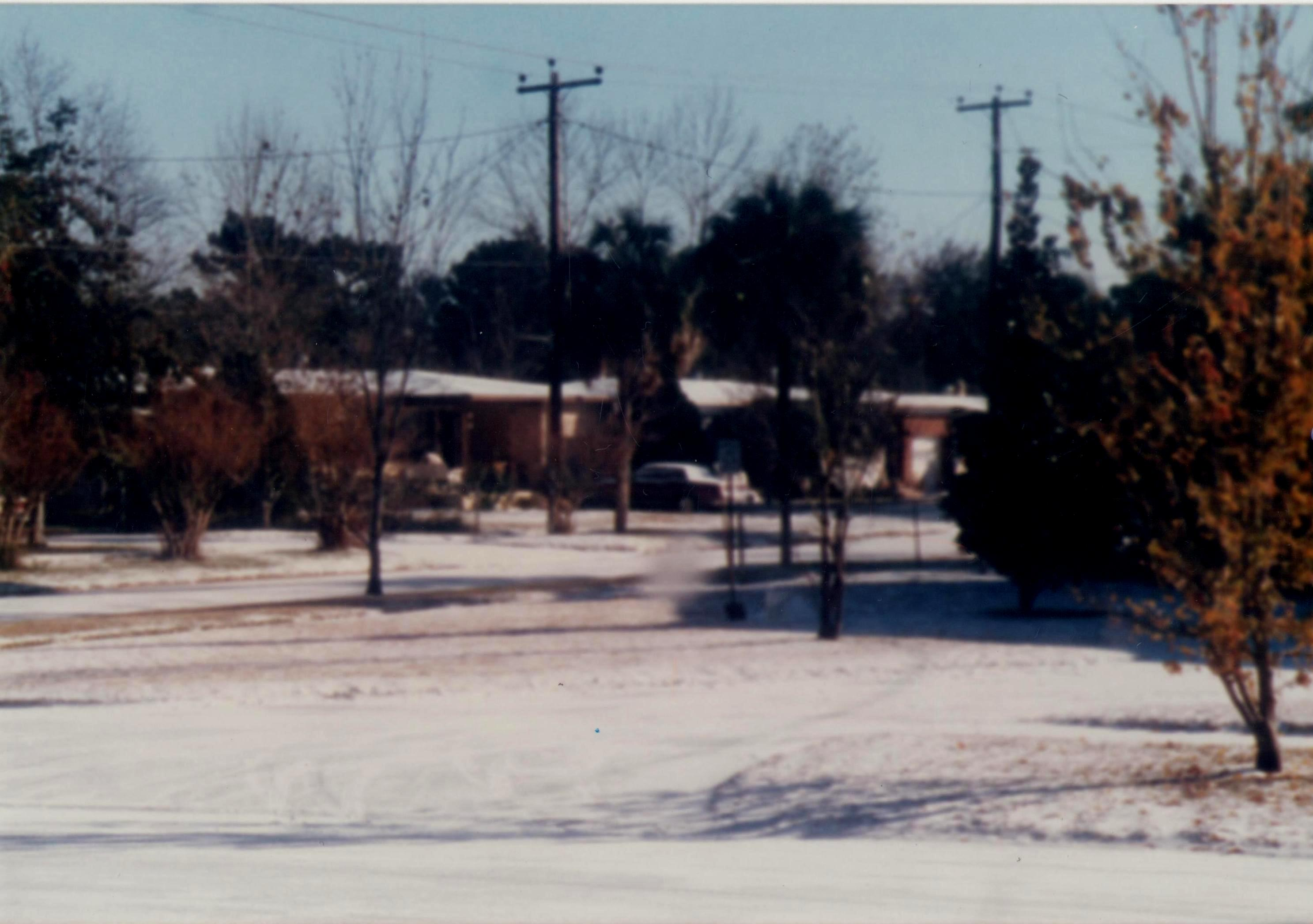
Snow in Jacksonville, Florida

Florida suffered rolling power outages, ruptured water pipes, and treacherous roads. At least 26 people died in the state. Governor Bob Martinez declared a disaster area in all 67 counties. A record low was set at High Springs of 8.0 °F (−13.3 °C). The Florida Highway Patrol closed parts of I-10 after at least three vehicle pileups on icy bridges. The electronic flushing system of Orlando International Airport failed. Workers at Gator Bowl Stadium flushed 503 toilets continuously in the hopes of avoiding water pipe problems for the December 30 Gator Bowl but the stadium still suffered $5000 in damages. Jacksonville International Airport closed and Tallahassee Regional Airport had cancellations.

About 30% of the $1.4 billion in citrus crop industry was damaged. Other agricultural industries that suffered significant damage were sugarcane, strawberries, other berries, vegetables, ornamental plants, and fish. This was the fourth freeze in a decade after the 1981, 1983, and the 1985 North American cold wave and many growers were unable to recover, resulting in many family farms going out of business. The citrus industry in Florida migrated farther south in the state, where it remains. Most of the 117,000 acres of citrus groves in Lake County, Florida, then the second-largest citrus producer in the state, froze. The freeze marked the end of the local citrus industry. A citrus agent noted, "If you were still in the business, '89 pretty well sent you packing. It was a huge change to this county." Citrus farms began selling land to developers to cover their losses, resulting in the sprawl of urban Orlando. Only 10,000 acres of citrus groves in Lake County remained in 2014.

The lows of 31 F and 30 F (-1 C) on Christmas Eve and Christmas in Miami is the last freeze observed in Miami as of 2026.
