= Mariapolis =

Mariapolis may refer to:

- Mariápolis, a municipality in São Paulo, Brazil
- Mariapolis, Manitoba, an unincorporated community

== See also ==
- Mariópolis, a municipality in Paraná, Brazil
