= Tornadoes of 2015 =

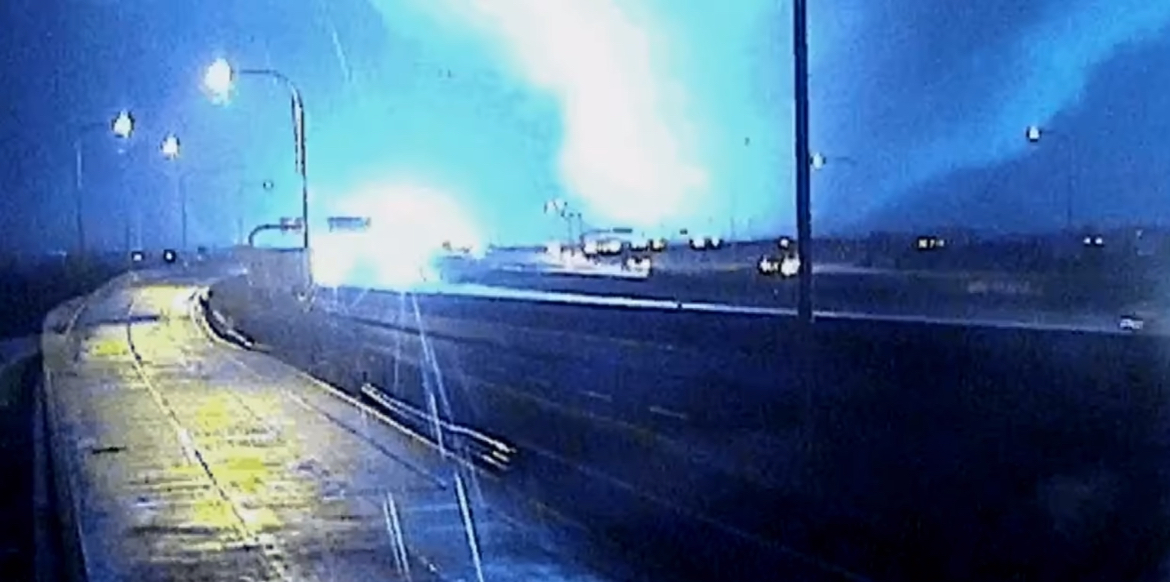
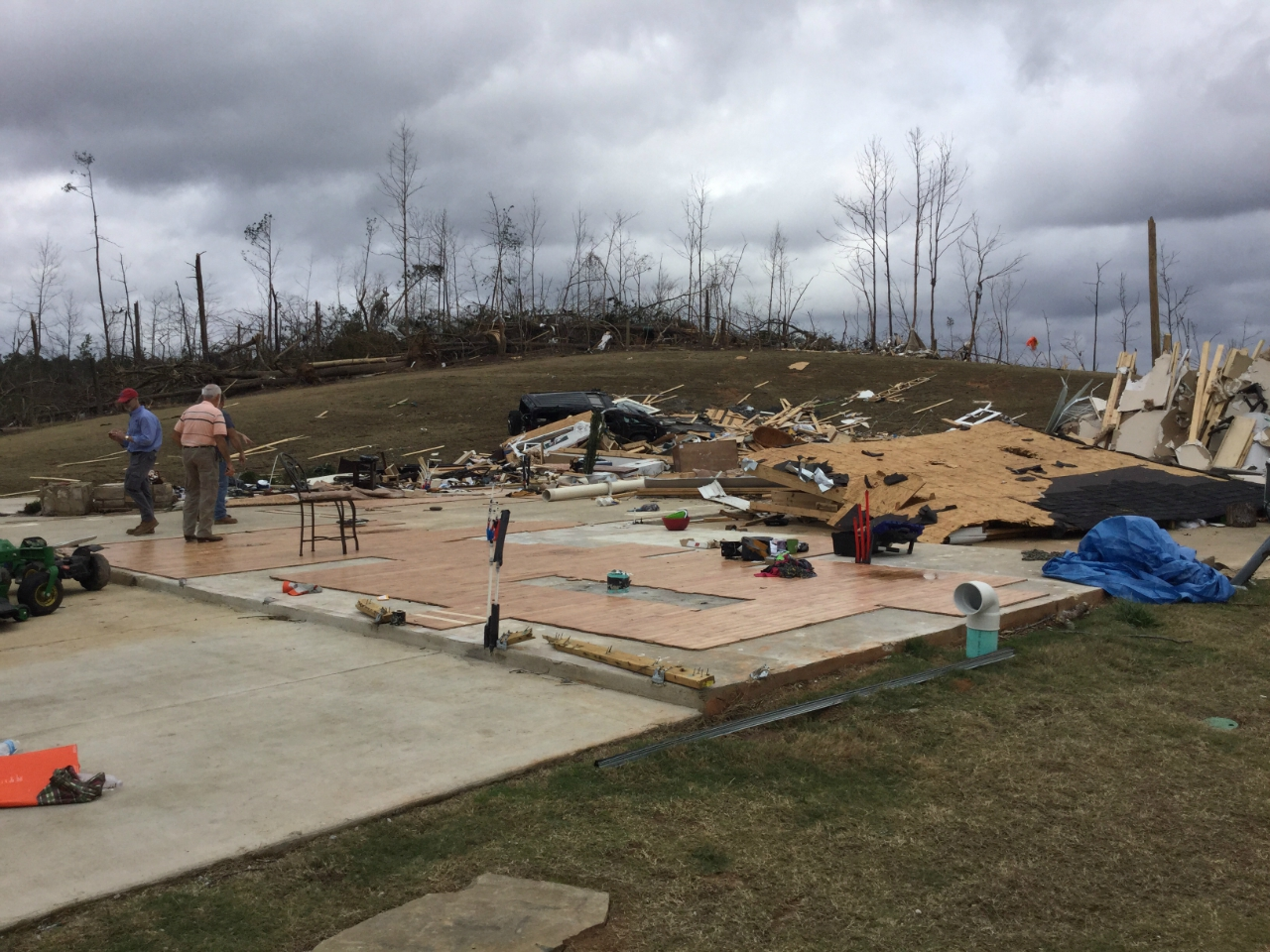
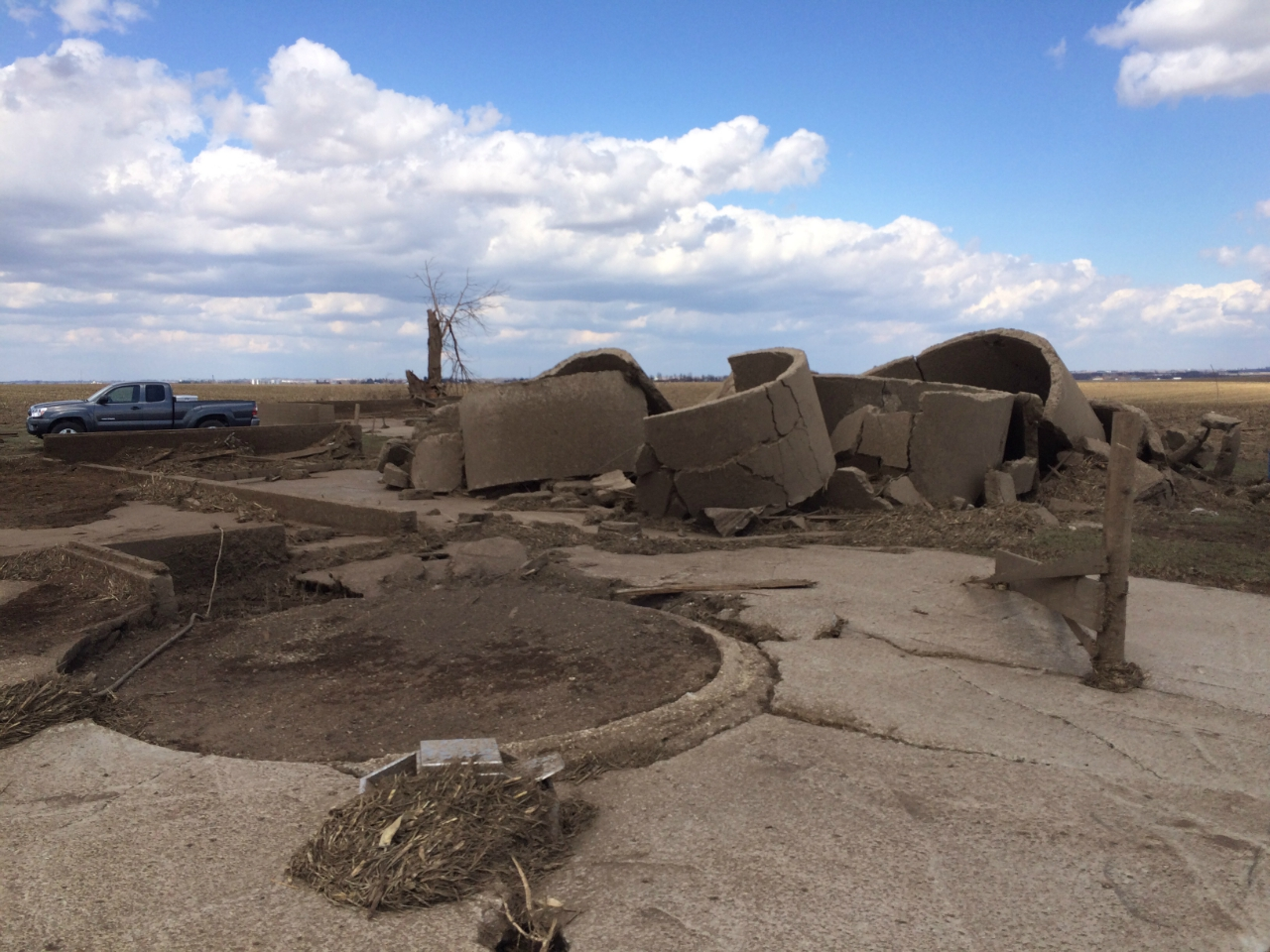
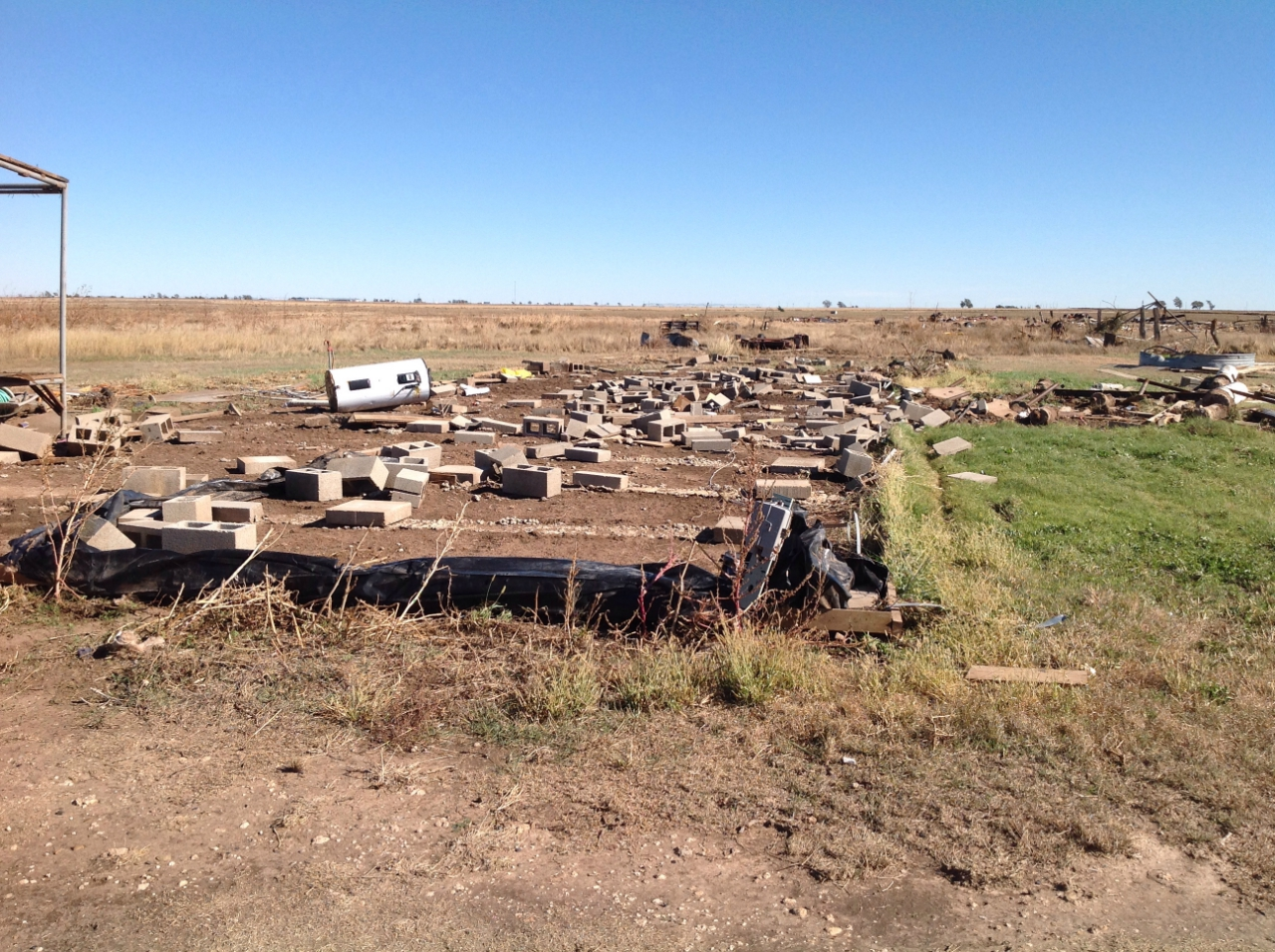
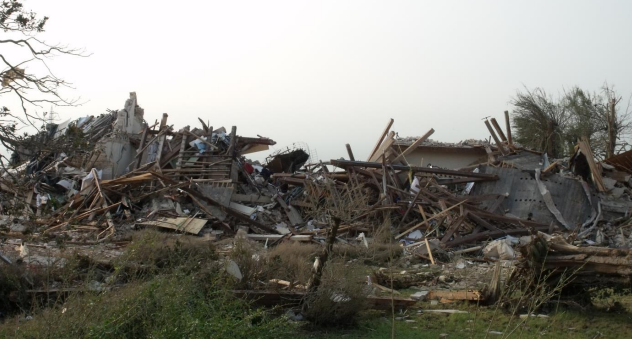
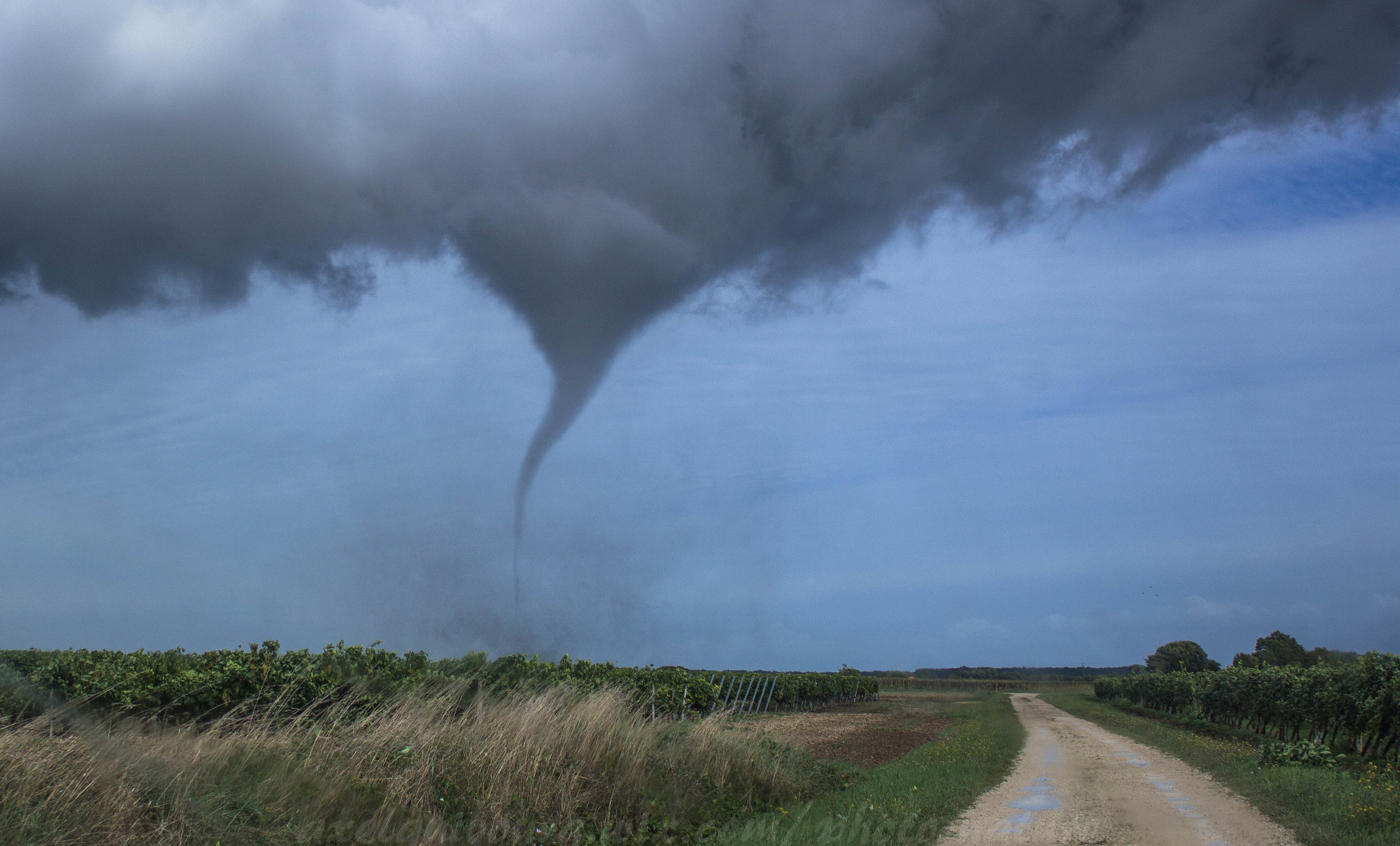
- Clockwise from top: An EF4 tornado illuminated by a power flash in Garland, Texas on December 26; A destroyed concrete silo following an EF4 tornado near Rochelle, Illinois on April 9; F4 damage to villa in Mira, Italy after a tornado on July 9; An F2 tornado in Aveyron Department, France on September 16; The remains of a mobile home after an EF3 tornado near Pampa, Texas on November 16; EF4 damage to a home in Canaan, Mississippi from a tornado on December 23.
- Timespan: January 3 - December 28
- Maximum rated tornado: EF4 tornado: Rochelle, Illinois on April 9; Dolo–Mira, Italy on July 8 (IF4); Francisco Beltrão, Paraná on July 13 (F4); Ashland, Mississippi on December 23; Garland, Texas on December 26
- Tornadoes in U.S.: 1,178
- Damage (U.S.): $321.122 million
- Fatalities (U.S.): 36
- Fatalities (worldwide): 109

This page documents notable tornadoes and tornado outbreaks worldwide in 2015. Strong and destructive tornadoes form most frequently in the United States, Bangladesh, Brazil and Eastern India, but they can occur almost anywhere under the right conditions. Tornadoes also develop occasionally in southern Canada during the Northern Hemisphere's summer and somewhat regularly at other times of the year across Europe, Asia, and Australia. Tornadic events are often accompanied with other forms of severe weather including strong thunderstorms, winds and hail. There were 1,178 tornadoes reported in the United States in 2015 according to the Storm Prediction Center (SPC), of which at least 1,178 have been confirmed. Worldwide, 109 fatalities have been reported: 45 in Pakistan, 36 in the United States, 14 in Mexico, seven in China, three in Myanmar, two in Brazil and one each in Italy and Russia.

2015 ended the very quiet trend of the 2012, 2013 and 2014 seasons, and it was the most active in four years.

== Synopsis ==
Throughout much of the first half of 2015, tornado activity was near record low mostly due to a continuous pattern of a trough in the east, bringing colder than average temperatures there. A ridge in the west brought warmer than average temperatures in the west. The pattern changed in late March and early April to allow for a few tornado outbreaks. One particular tornado outbreak spawned a deadly EF4 tornado near Rochelle, Illinois, on April 9.

During May, a few large tornado outbreaks occurred in a time span from May 5 to May 26, leading it to be the most active tornado month since April 2011 and the most active May since 2008. Average to above average tornado outbreak continued to occur in June and July, decreasing slightly between August - October.

Due to a significant El Niño event, November and December were extremely active months, with over 20 fatalities in December alone, the majority of which came from 2 EF4 tornadoes in Mississippi (December 23) and Texas (December 26), days apart from each other. 93 tornadoes were reported in December, well above average for that month, mainly from 2 significant tornado outbreaks days before and immediately after Christmas. Furthermore, 2015 was the first year since 2011 to see a total of more than 1,000 tornadoes across the United States.

== Events ==
=== United States yearly total ===
Confirmed tornadoes by Enhanced Fujita rating
EFU	EF0	EF1	EF2	EF3	EF4	EF5	Total
0	691	401	65	18	3	0	1,178

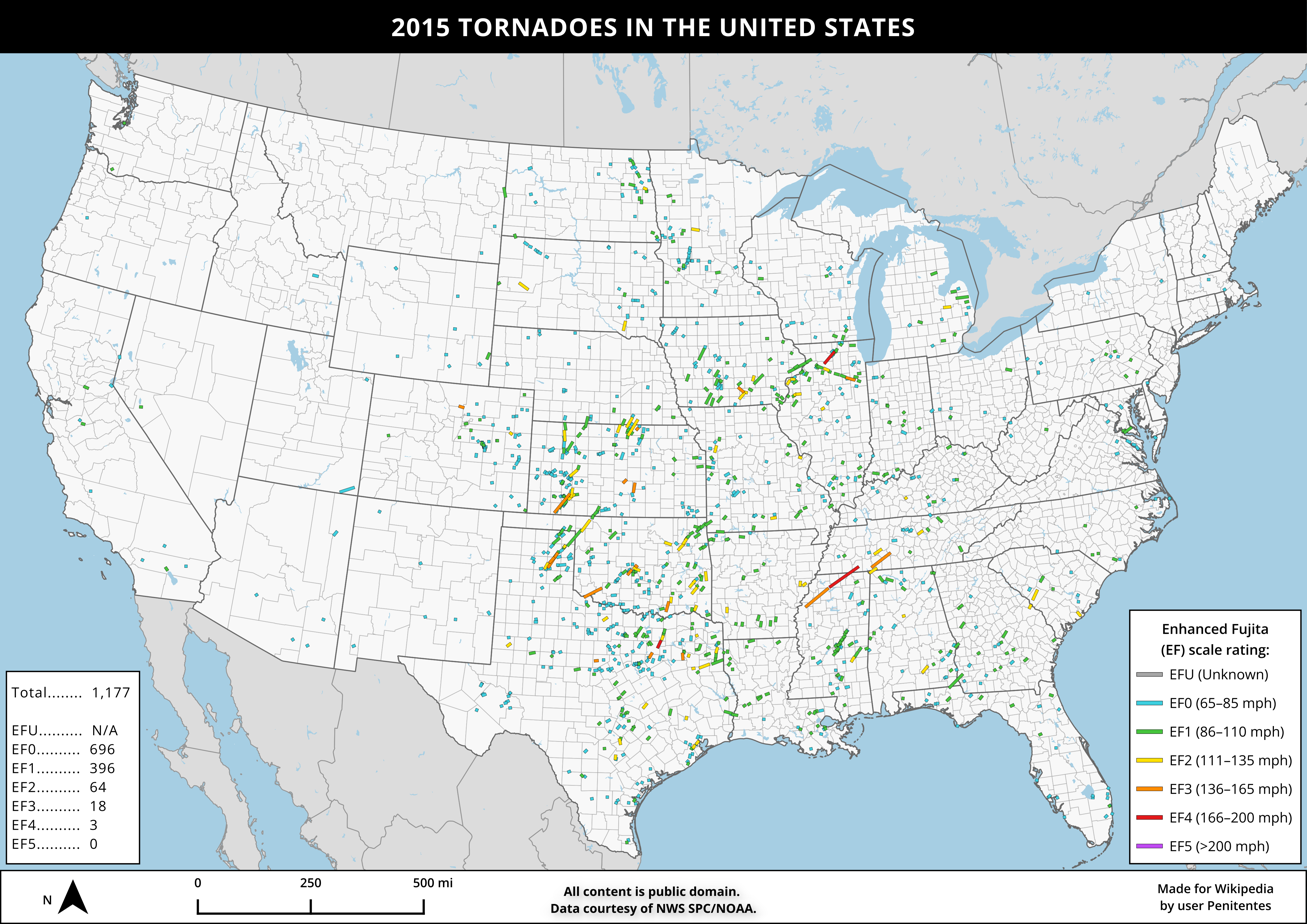
A map of 2015 United States tornado paths from the results of storm surveys.

A chart of the 2015 United States tornado count estimated from the number of preliminary reports

Fatal tornadoes in the United States in 2015
- Approximate touchdown location of killer tornadoes in 2015 Summary of tornadoes: March 25 – Oklahoma (1 death); April 9 – Illinois (2 deaths); May 9 – Texas (1 death); May 10 – Texas (2 deaths); May 10 – Arkansas (2 deaths); May 25 – Oklahoma (1 death); May 25 – Texas (1 death); December 23 – Mississippi (2 deaths); December 23 – Mississippi (9 deaths); December 23 – Tennessee (2 deaths); December 26 – Texas (10 deaths); December 26 – Texas (2 deaths); December 26 – Texas (1 death); Total fatalities: 36

== January ==
=== January 3–4 (United States) ===
EFU	EF0	EF1	EF2	EF3	EF4	EF5
0	11	14	2	0	0	0

On January 1, the Storm Prediction Center (SPC) began highlighting the potential for severe weather across portions of the central Gulf Coast and lower Mississippi Valley. The following day, the pre-existing Marginal risk was upgraded to a Slight risk across southeastern Louisiana, southeastern Mississippi, and southwestern Alabama. On January 3, the combination of high dewpoints, marginal instability, and strong wind shear allowed for the development of supercells across central and southern Mississippi, where an Enhanced risk was briefly introduced. An EF2 tornado touched down west of Rose Hill, Mississippi, causing significant damage, while several other tornadoes were recorded. Activity spread eastward on January 4, with a second EF2 tornado causing substantial damage north of Dozier, Alabama.

== February ==
No notable tornado events occurred in the month of February across the globe.

== March ==
=== March 24–25 (United States) ===
EFU	EF0	EF1	EF2	EF3	EF4	EF5
0	8	1	2	0	0	0

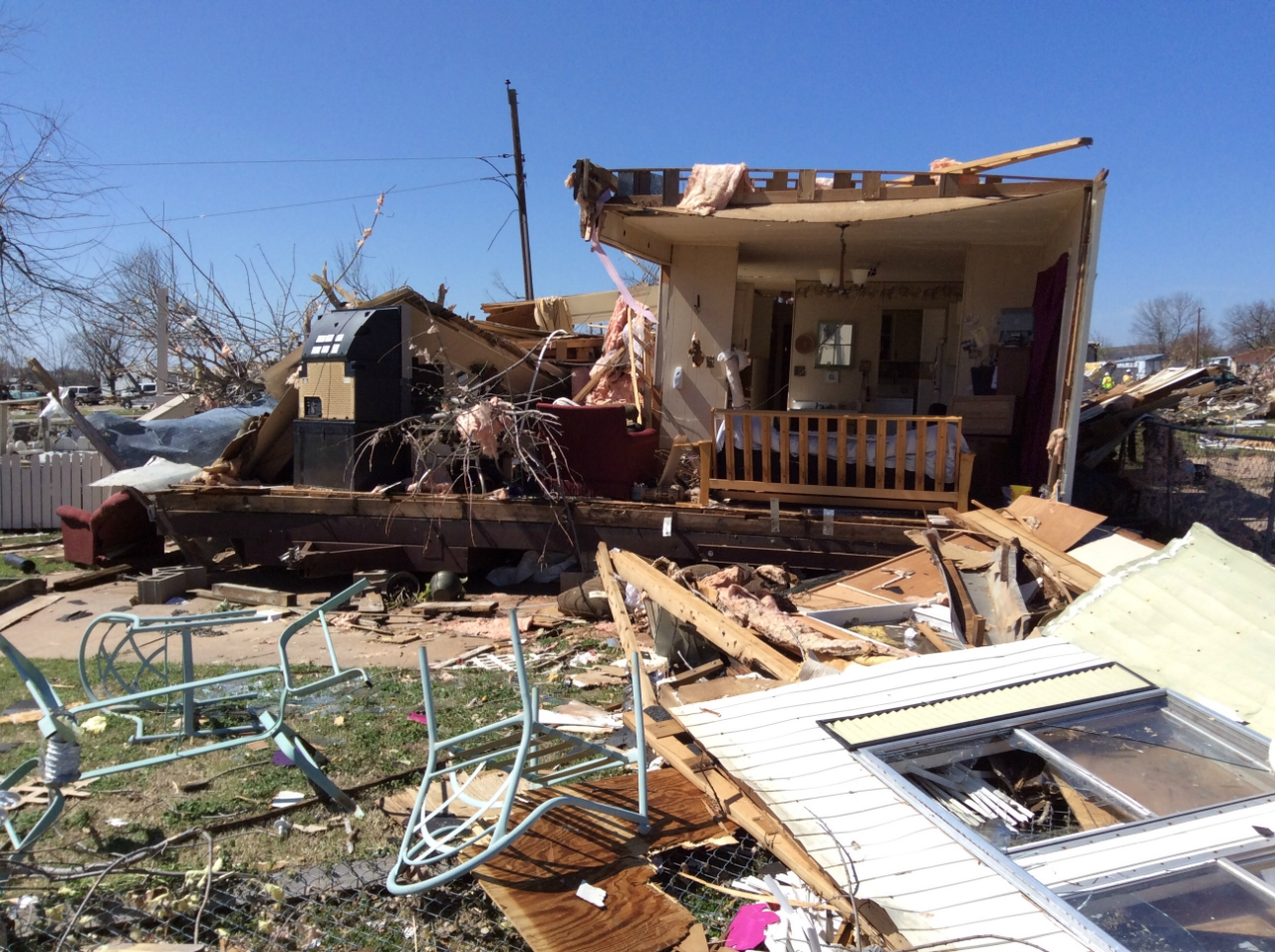
A double-wide mobile home destroyed by an EF2 tornado in Sand Springs, Oklahoma

Early on March 24, the SPC outlined an Enhanced risk for severe weather across portions of southwestern Missouri, northwestern Arkansas, and northeastern Oklahoma, where conditions were expected to become favorable for strong supercells. That afternoon, a waterspout over Bull Shoals Lake moved ashore as an EF0 tornado but caused no damage. Numerous reports of damaging winds and hail were relayed. On March 25, a more substantial severe weather risk evolved across southwestern Missouri, northwestern Arkansas, and northeastern Oklahoma, where the SPC outlined the year's first Moderate risk. At 22:21 UTC, a waterspout spawned over Keystone Lake and moved through Sand Springs, Oklahoma, causing EF2 damage in a mobile home park where one fatality and 30 injuries were observed. At 23:34 UTC, a second EF2 tornado developed and tracked through southwestern Oklahoma City, Oklahoma, before entering Moore. Several structures sustained substantial damage, and several cars were flipped and overturned on I-35. Several other weak tornadoes touched down in adjacent states as well.

== April ==
=== April 2 (India) ===
On April 2, a tornado of unknown strength struck the city of Bikaner in Rajasthan, India. At least 50 families were displaced by the storm.

=== April 2–3 (United States) ===
EFU	EF0	EF1	EF2	EF3	EF4	EF5
0	10	6	1	0	0	0

On April 2, upper-level southwesterly flow overspread the Ozarks and Ohio River Valley, where an Enhanced risk for severe weather was introduced by the SPC. A surface low tracked into Ontario, supporting a cold front down into southern Missouri. Throughout the afternoon hours, a shortwave trough tracked across the Central Plains, providing ample lift for the development of severe thunderstorms. Several weak tornadoes were recorded. On April 3, the Enhanced risk shifted southeast, encompassing portions of Kentucky, Tennessee, Mississippi, and Alabama. An EF2 tornado tracked north of Pomona, Missouri, in the pre-dawn hours, damaging or destroying several buildings. Several tornadoes of lesser intensity were observed farther east.

=== April 6 (Myanmar) ===
On April 6, three people were killed and five others were injured when a tornado struck two villages within Phakant, Kachin State, Myanmar.

=== April 8–9 (United States) ===
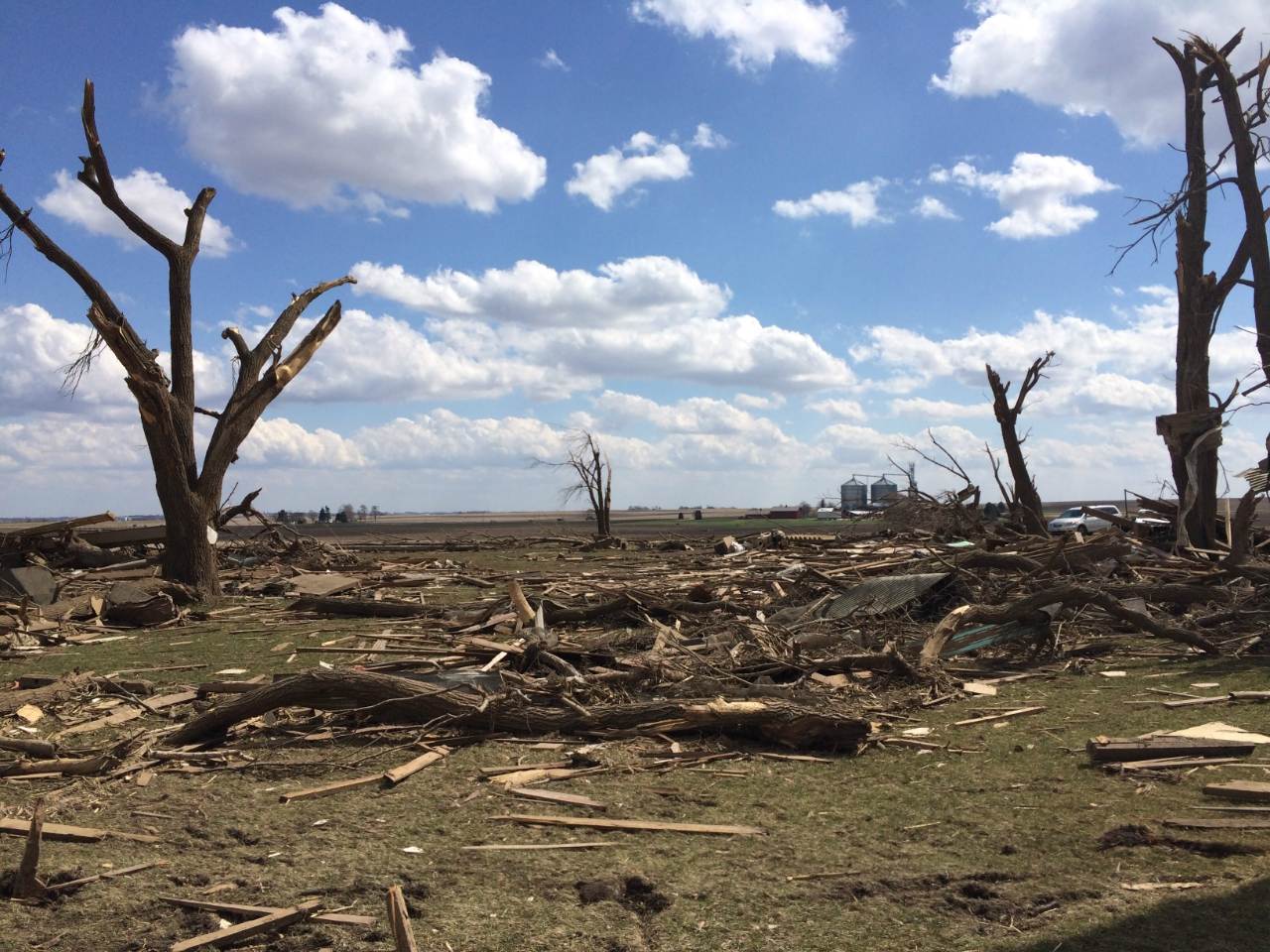
Damage from a large EF4 tornado on April 9.

EFU	EF0	EF1	EF2	EF3	EF4	EF5
0	16	9	1	0	1	0

A two-day severe weather episode affected parts of the Great Plains and Midwestern United States. Several EF0 tornadoes occurred on April 8 in the south central part of Kansas, including some to the northwest of Wichita, Kansas, near the towns of Garden Plain and Andale. An EF1 tornado caused moderate damage as it struck the town of Potosi, Missouri, that evening as well. Several tornadoes were also reported from Texas to Illinois on April 9. A multiple-vortex EF1 tornado struck the towns of Clinton, Iowa, and Fulton, Illinois, and an EF2 tornado near Mount Selman, Texas, snapped and uprooted numerous trees, damaged outbuildings, and removed the roof and collapsed a few exterior walls at a frame home.

The most significant event of the outbreak was a violent, long-tracked, very high-end EF4 wedge tornado that moved along a 30.14 mile-long path across several counties in northern Illinois, killing two people and injuring another 22. An EF0 satellite tornado also caused major damage to outbuildings at the Summerfield Zoo near Belvidere, where two animals were killed. Two other EF1 tornadoes from the same parent supercell also occurred near Belvidere after the main EF4 dissipated, causing mostly minor damage, though one home lost most of its roof. Another tornado spawned by a separate supercell passed near Cherry Valley, though it remained over open country and caused no damage. Overall, this relatively small outbreak produced 2 fatalities and 24 tornadoes.

=== April 20 (Brazil) ===
FU	F0	F1	F2	F3	F4	F5
0	0	1	1	0	0	0

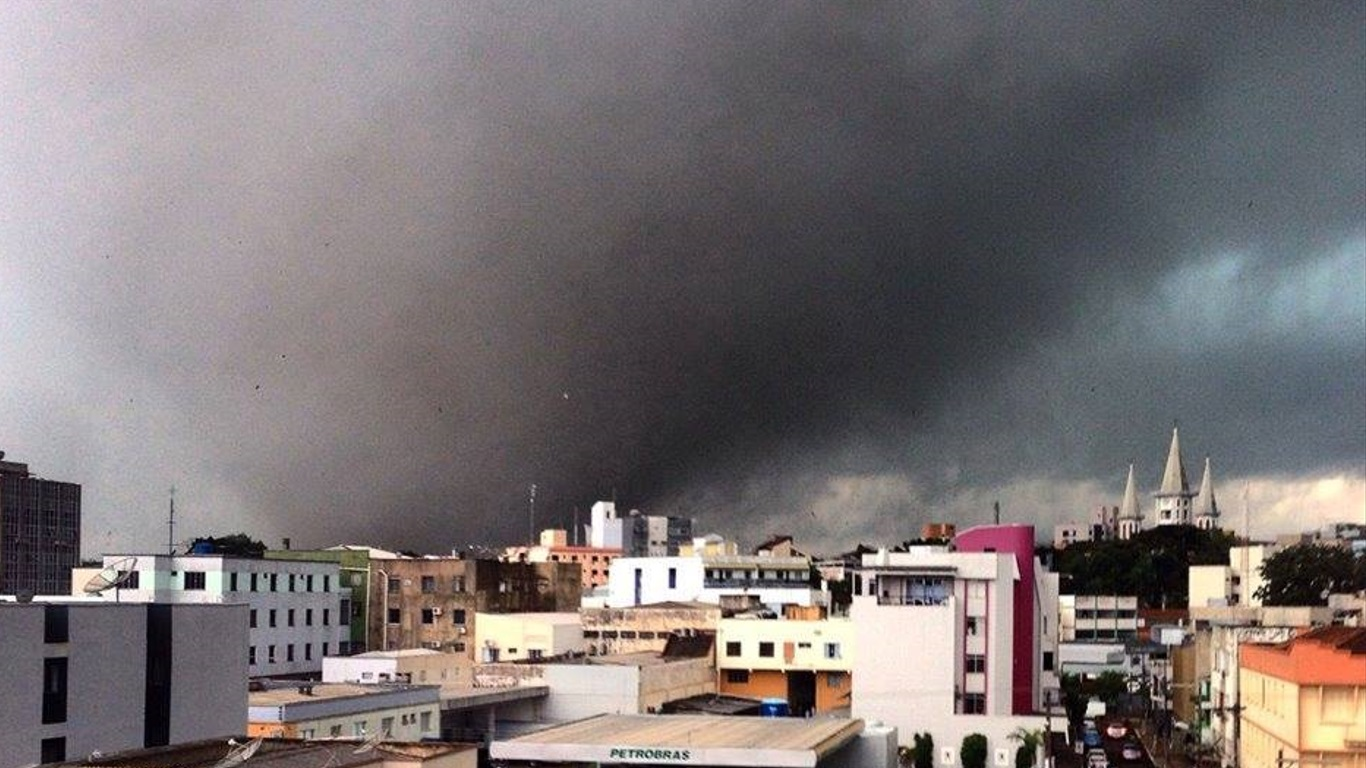
An F2 tornado passing through Xanxere.

A long-tracked, rain-wrapped F2 wedge tornado spawned by a supercell thunderstorm struck the city of Xanxerê, Santa Catarina in Brazil during the afternoon of April 20, resulting in major damage. Approximately 500 homes were damaged in the city, many of which lost their roofs and exterior walls, and some smaller homes were completely destroyed. Many trees and power lines were downed, trees were snapped and debarked, vehicles were overturned, and industrial buildings sustained severe damage as well. Two people lost their lives. Additionally, 120 people were injured, 15 critically. The meteorological consulting agency MetSul Meteorologia stated it was one of the largest tornadoes ever recorded in Brazil. Roughly 1,000 people were forced out of their homes due to the storm. The city of Ponte Serrada was struck by an F1 tornado on the same day.

=== April 26 (Pakistan) ===
On the night of 26 April 2015, a severe storm hit areas of Khyber Pakhtunkhwa, Pakistan, causing considerable damage in the cities of Peshawar, Nowshera, and Charsadda. The storm featured heavy rains accompanied by hail and high-speed winds of over 120 kilometers per hour (or 75 miles per hour). As a result of the storm's damaging effects, 45 people were killed and over 200 were wounded. The storm occurred after parts of Pakistan were already partially flooded from prior rainfall in February 2015, up to a meter (or three feet) deep in some places. The storm also collapsed many buildings’ walls and roofs, took down many electricity poles, and killed livestock and damaged many crops in rural Peshawar and Charsadda (including wheat crops and orchards).

After the storm, many people remained injured or without drinkable water, food, and shelter. The Khyber Pakhtunkhwa government organized and sent members of the Provincial Disaster Management Authority (PMDA) and the military to aid with rescue and recovery efforts in the areas affected. Subsequent wind, rain and hail in the aftermath of the cyclone disrupted the power supply and telecommunication services in the region. The storm was informally dubbed a “mini-cyclone” in the press. Later analysis by the Pakistan Meteorological Department determined that the event was a tornado.

Heavy weather on the next day forced the Pakistani military to cancel two flights to Nepal taking supplies to survivors of the earthquake on the previous day.

== May ==
=== May 5 (Germany) ===
FU	F0	F1	F2	F3	F4	F5
2	0	3	1	1	0	0

A localized tornado outbreak impacted northeastern Germany on May 5. The first tornado of the day touched down briefly in the city of Lübeck, uprooting some trees. Another brief tornado was sighted near Neu Kaliß, causing no known damage, while an F1 tornado damaged trees, sheds, fences, a warehouse, and the roofs of homes in Brüel. Another F1 tornado caused tree damage in the Ahrensboek area as well. A strong F2 tornado passed through the west edge of Groß Laasch, flattening a large swath of trees and severely damaging a brick train station, which sustained roof loss and collapse of multiple exterior walls. The most significant tornado of the event was a destructive F3 wedge tornado which hit the town of Bützow, Mecklenburg-Vorpommern, causing major structural damage and littering streets with bricks and debris. Numerous large and well-built brick homes, churches, and other buildings were heavily damaged, several had their roofs torn off, and a few sustained collapse of exterior walls. A large garage structure and a small, wood-framed bungalow style home were both completely destroyed in town. Pieces of lumber were impaled through the walls of some structures, and sheet metal was wrapped around trees. Many large trees throughout Bützow were snapped or denuded, and vehicles were flipped and thrown, including one that car was thrown 70 meters by the tornado. The tornado was on the ground for 14.8 km, had a path width up to 1.5 km wide, and injured 30 people. An F1 tornado also downed trees near Woland. Overall, this small outbreak produced seven tornadoes. In addition, damaging straight-line thunderstorm winds killed one person and injured 30 others in Hamburg. This event followed an episode of unusually warm weather in the area.

=== May 5–10 (United States) ===
EFU	EF0	EF1	EF2	EF3	EF4	EF5
0	86	27	8	6	0	0

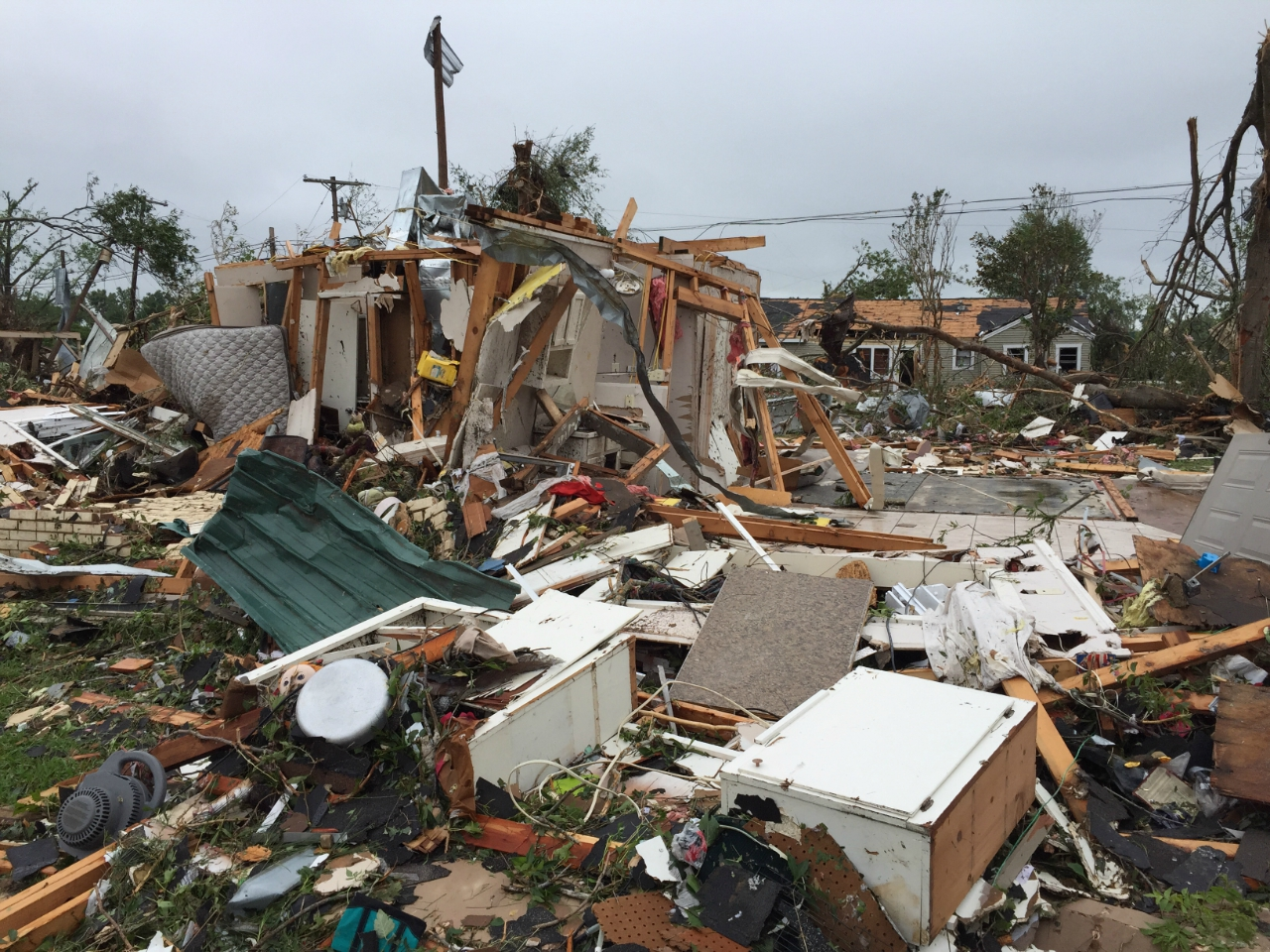
EF3 damage to a house in Van, Texas.

A six-day outbreak of tornadic activity began on May 5 with isolated tornadoes in western Texas. More widespread and significant activity occurred on May 6. Much of central Oklahoma experienced tornadoes, and the town of Bridge Creek sustained major impacts from a large EF3 tornado, where several businesses and homes were heavily damaged or destroyed. Another EF3 tornado caused major damage in southwestern parts of Oklahoma City, just north of Valley Brook, where a hotel, several self-storage units, a mobile home park, and an RV park were heavily damaged, numerous vehicles were flipped, and at least 12 people were injured. Large, strong tornadoes, including two EF3 tornadoes, severely damaged or completely destroyed rural homes near the Kansas towns of Mount Hope, Scandia, and Munden. Several additional less intense tornadoes occurred on May 7 and May 8 across an area extending from Colorado to Texas. Another wave of significant tornado activity occurred on May 9 throughout an area extending from Nebraska to Texas. This included a large EF3 tornado that caused major damage and killed one person near Cisco, Texas. Destructive tornado activity continued on May 10, as a high-end EF2 tornado struck the town of Delmont, South Dakota, where severe structural damage and injuries occurred. Later that evening, a multiple-vortex EF1 tornado struck Lake City, Iowa, where homes were damaged, trees and power lines were downed, and the local high school had its roof torn off. Significant tornadoes continued to touch down after sunset later that night, and the town of Van, Texas, was devastated by a strong EF3 tornado, where two people were killed and 47 others were injured. Two other fatalities occurred in Nashville, Arkansas, when an EF2 tornado struck a mobile home park. A total of 127 tornadoes were confirmed and rated as a result of this outbreak sequence.

=== May 13–14 (Europe) ===
FU	F0	F1	F2	F3	F4	F5
1	0	0	1	2	0	0

For the second time in one month, a localized but damaging outbreak of tornadoes occurred in Germany, as multiple strong tornadoes touched down on the night of May 13 into the early morning hours of May 14. The first tornado of the event, which was rated F2, occurred in eastern France, tearing the roofs off of homes, destroying barns, damaging vehicles, and downing trees and power lines in the Gerbépal area. As the severe storms continued into Germany later that night, a cone-shaped tornado of unknown intensity was photographed near Lenzkirch as it snapped many trees in the Black Forest. A destructive F3 tornado then touched down in the district of Aichach-Friedberg north of Augsburg, Bavaria. The strong tornado moved directly through Stettenhofen, Gebenhofen and Affing, inflicting major structural damage to numerous buildings in all three towns. Multiple well-built homes and apartment buildings along the path had their roofs torn off, a few sustained loss of exterior walls, and debris was scattered throughout residential areas. Numerous large trees were snapped, denuded, or uprooted along the path, cars were tossed and rolled, and signs were destroyed. The Salzbergkapelle church also had its roof torn off near Anwalting. After exiting Affing, the tornado weakened as it continued to the east and damaged the roof a of a school in Aichach before dissipating. The Affing tornado had a path length of at least 14.3 km, and it damaged or destroyed 220 buildings, resulting in several injuries. Another F3 tornado cut a 17 km long path through the Black Forest near Bonndorf, Baden-Württemberg and completely flattened a large swath of trees. All trees in the direct path of this large and powerful tornado were snapped, with some trees denuded and debarked in the most severely affected areas. The worst of the tree damage along the path was rated high-end F3. Several large metal truss transmission towers were blown over and mangled, farm fields were scoured, outbuildings were destroyed, and one house was severely damaged as well, with debris from the structure scattered through a meadow. A total of four tornadoes were confirmed, and 10 people were injured as a result of this event.

=== May 16–17 (United States) ===
EFU	EF0	EF1	EF2	EF3	EF4	EF5
0	33	23	3	1	0	0

A two-day tornado outbreak affected the Great Plains states beginning on May 16. Most of these tornadoes were weak, though a few significant tornadoes occurred, including a large and long-lived multiple-vortex wedge tornado that tracked from near Chillicothe, Texas, to near Snyder, Oklahoma, causing significant damage to farming equipment, trees, and a few structures along its path. The tornado was caught on video by numerous storm chasers as it passed near Elmer, Oklahoma. Based on radar and video evidence, surveyors determined that it was likely a violent tornado capable of producing EF4 or greater damage, though due to the fact that the tornado remained over very rural areas throughout most of its life and never directly impacted any substantial structures, the highest rating that could be applied was EF3. Two EF2 tornadoes also caused heavy damage near the town of Inola, Oklahoma, later that evening, one of which damaged up to 120 homes. Further east, an EF2 tornado destroyed a mobile home and damaged frame homes near Sibley and Orrick, Missouri. Numerous additional weak tornadoes occurred mainly across Iowa, Oklahoma, and Missouri the following day. Overall, the outbreak produced 60 tornadoes and no deaths.

=== May 23–26 (United States and Mexico) ===
EFU	EF0	EF1	EF2	EF3	EF4	EF5
0	28	38	7	2	0	0

A large storm system that resulted in catastrophic flooding produced numerous tornadoes across the Great Plains on May 23 and 24. Most of these tornadoes were weak, though EF2 tornadoes caused considerable damage near New Boston, Illinois, and Ensign, Kansas. In Texas, EF1 tornadoes impacted mainly residential areas of Dallas, Houston, and Corpus Christi as well. In the early morning hours of May 25, a destructive tornado struck the Mexican border city of Ciudad Acuña, Coahuila; it was the first twister to strike the city in its history. Numerous cars and buses were thrown and mangled, and 750 properties were damaged or completely destroyed. Several masonry construction homes along the path were completely leveled. 14 fatalities occurred as a result, and an additional 229 residents were injured. The tornado was officially rated F3, though some sources list it as an F4. Additional tornadoes, a few of which were strong, touched down in Texas later throughout the day. This included an EF2 that killed one person near Cameron, Texas. Another EF2 tornado struck Henderson, causing considerable damage in town. In Oklahoma, an EF2 tornado caused heavy damage near the towns of Wister and Panama, while an EF3 tornado killed one person near Blue. Overall, the outbreak produced 76 tornadoes and killed 16 people, making it the deadliest North American tornado outbreak of 2015. This is the largest tornado outbreak in Central Texas history.

== June ==
=== June 4 (Colorado) ===
EFU	EF0	EF1	EF2	EF3	EF4	EF5
0	16	3	0	1	0	0

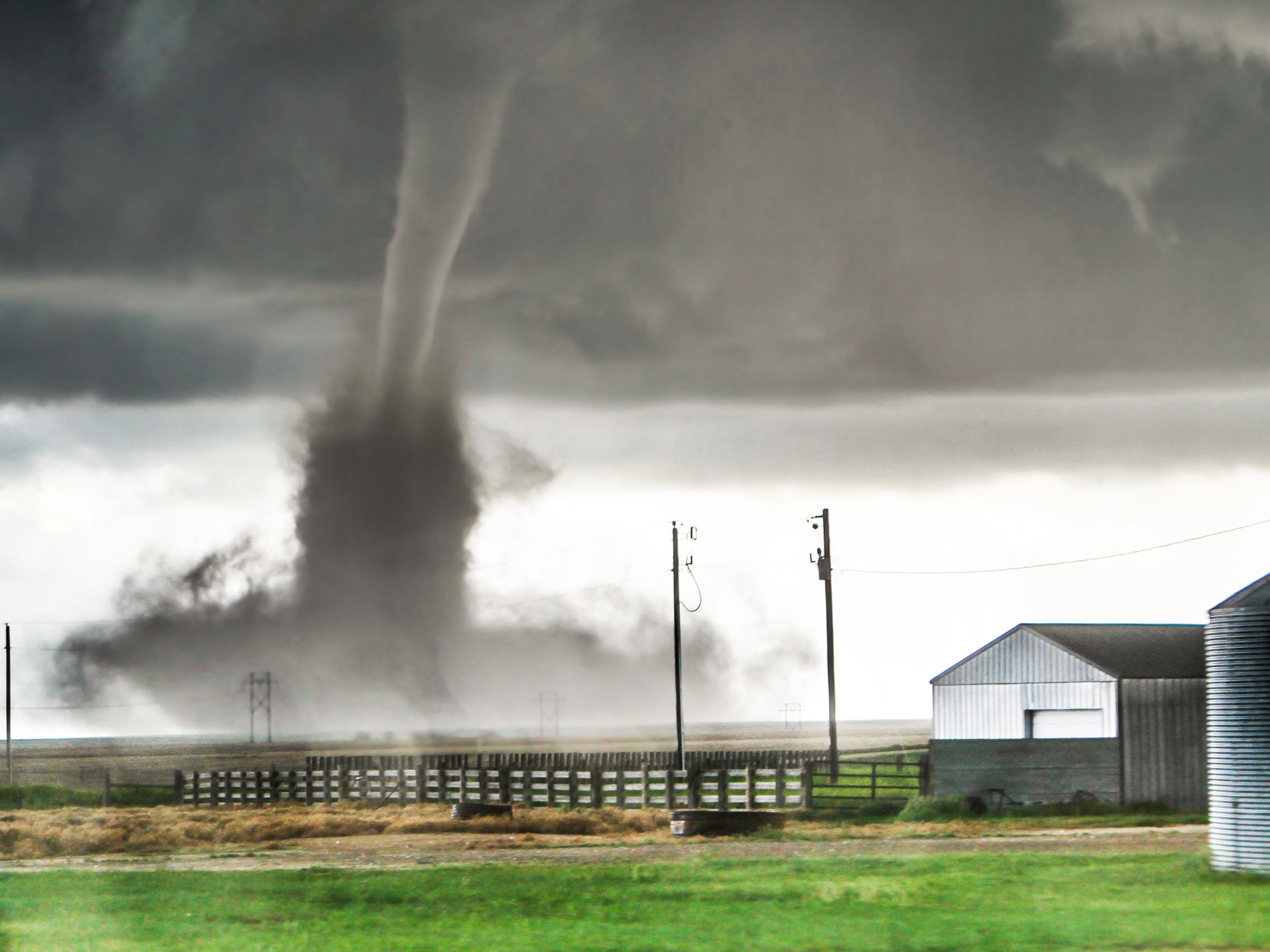
One of the many tornadoes to impact north-central Colorado on June 4th

On June 4, severe thunderstorms developed over north central Colorado and produced a total of 20 tornadoes, most of which were weak. However, there was one EF3 tornado that damaged 25 homes, destroyed three of them, and debarked small trees near Berthoud, Colorado. The tornado moved on an unusual westward track and was the first EF3 tornado in Colorado since 2008. Another supercell dropped 19 weak tornadoes near Simla, Colorado, over the course of about three hours. Three of them were rated EF1 and the rest were rated EF0, and some of the tornadoes were anticyclonic. In addition, large hail also fell in Boulder and Elbert counties.

=== June 22–23 (United States) ===
EFU	EF0	EF1	EF2	EF3	EF4	EF5
0	9	13	4	2	0	0

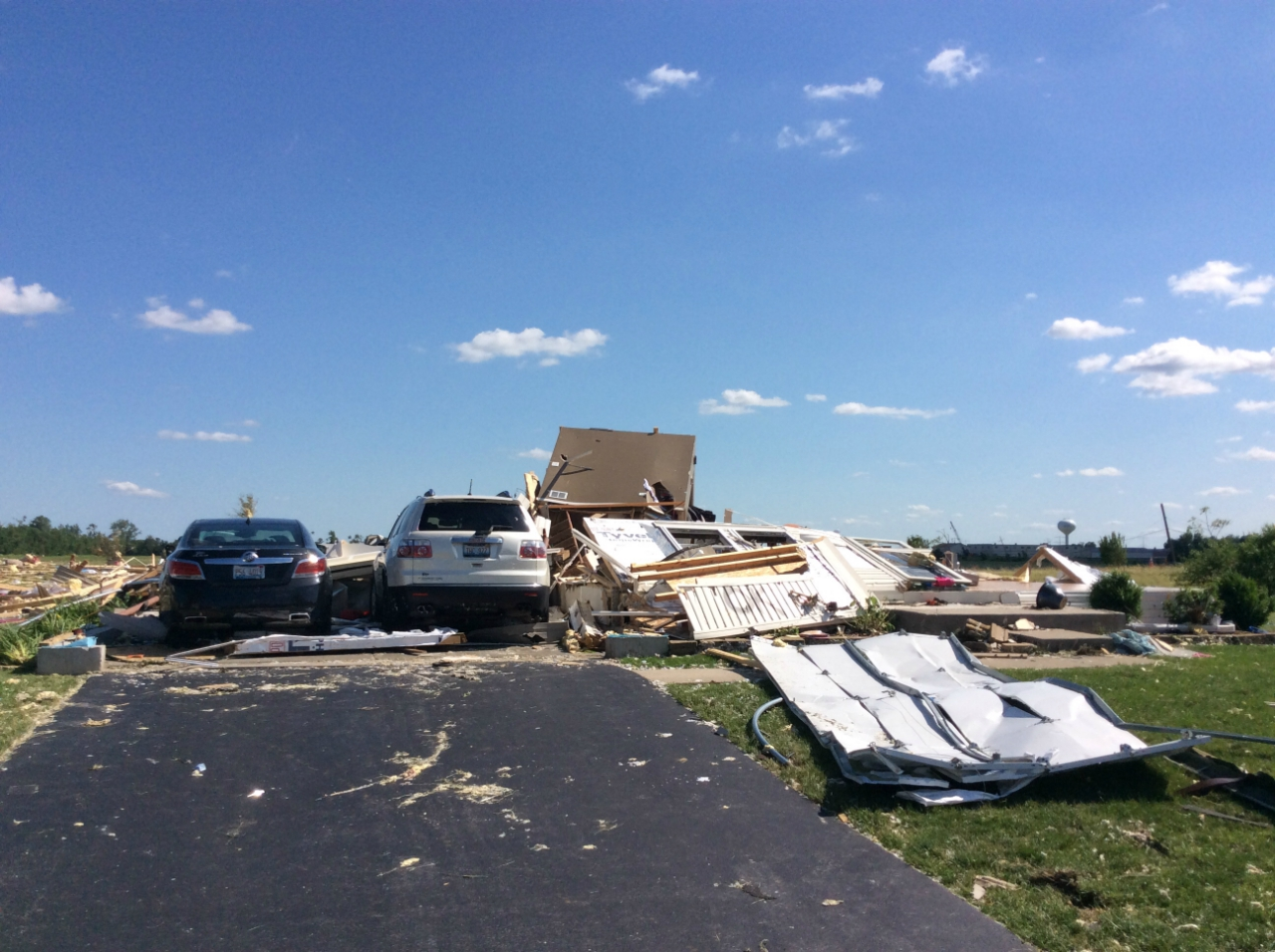
High-end EF3 damage to a house in Coal City, Illinois.

A damaging outbreak of strong tornadoes impacted the Great Lakes region of the United States from June 22 to June 23. The most significant activity occurred on the 22nd, including a high-end EF1 tornado that damaged numerous structures in Portland, Michigan, early that afternoon. The tornado was produced by a derecho, but the storm was not severe warned at the time. Later that evening, a strong, rain-wrapped EF3 tornado partially debarked trees and swept away an unanchored house near Lovilia, Iowa, before weakening and striking the town of Albia at EF1 strength. A separate EF2 tornado from the same cell heavily damaged homes and businesses west of Albia as well. As the evening progressed, numerous tornadoes began touching down across northern Illinois and in Michigan as well. An EF2 struck the south side of Edgington, Illinois, tearing roofs off of homes, destroying garages, and snapping large trees. Another large EF2 wedge tornado caused major damage at the Woodhaven Lakes Campground near Sublette, flattening a large swath of trees, destroying or tossing numerous recreational vehicles and mobile homes, and injuring seven people. In Michigan, an EF2 tornado severely damaged two homes and downed numerous trees near the town of Millington.

The strongest and most destructive tornado of the outbreak initially touched down after dark as a weak tornado south of Morris, Illinois, causing roof and chimney damage to homes, and downing trees and power poles as it moved along a southeasterly path. The storm intensified and widened rapidly as it entered Coal City, reaching nearly a mile wide in diameter and attaining high-end EF3 strength. Numerous anchor-bolted frame homes in Coal City were damaged or destroyed, and a few were leveled or swept from their foundations, though vehicles parked at these residences were not moved, and nearby vegetation was not defoliated or debarked, precluding a higher rating. Two large high-tension metal truss towers were toppled to the ground in Coal City as well. The tornado weakened to EF2 strength as it struck the neighboring town of Braidwood, heavily damaging trees, power poles, and a motel in the southwestern part of town. The tornado moved out of Braidwood and maintained EF2 strength as it continued along its southeasterly path through rural areas, rolling a recreational vehicle, damaging the roof of a frame home, snapping numerous power poles, and completely destroying an outbuilding before dissipating. The outbreak continued the following day as a few weak tornadoes were observed in Michigan, Ohio, and Massachusetts. Overall, this outbreak produced 28 tornadoes, though no fatalities occurred.

== July ==
=== July 8 (Italy) ===
On the evening of July 8, a large and violent cone-shaped IF4 tornado impacted areas in and around the towns of Dolo and Mira, causing major structural damage within the Riviera del Brenta region of Italy, famous for its villas and channels. Many buildings were badly damaged or destroyed, and among them was the large, two-story, masonry construction Villa Fini restaurant and hotel from the 17th century, which was almost entirely leveled to the ground in Mira. Damage to this structure was rated IF4 on the International Fujita scale. An additional small area of IF4 damage occurred nearby as several large and very well-built reinforced masonry homes were severely damaged along a canal in town, with collapse of thick reinforced walls observed. One of these homes sustained total collapse of its second floor, with damage to the first floor as well, while nearby trees sustained severe denuding and debarking. No structures were leveled in typical IF4 fashion in this area, though surveyors determined that IF4-level winds would have been needed to cause the degree of structural damage noted at these homes. Many other homes in and around Dolo and Mira also sustained F2 to F3 damage, with partial to total roof loss, damage to exterior walls, and impact marks from flying debris. Hundreds of other homes sustained minor to moderate roof and window damage, and several warehouses and apartment buildings had extensive roof and exterior damage as well. As the tornado moved through rural areas outside of Mira, high-end F3 to IF4 damage continued, as a couple of extremely well-built concrete frame homes had their roofs and multiple concrete walls ripped off. Reinforced concrete beams were torn from one home and thrown over 100 yards (91 m) into a field, and the remaining walls of the home were splattered with mud. A large masonry building was also completely destroyed in this area, and a few small brick cottages were leveled as well. Several other homes and farmsteads were severely damaged or destroyed, metal high-tension truss towers were toppled to the ground, reinforced concrete power poles were snapped, and agricultural fields were scoured. Many trees were uprooted, snapped, and partially debarked along the path of this tornado, and numerous cars were tossed and mangled, a few of which were thrown into canals and submerged. A total of 500 structures were damaged or destroyed by this tornado. One person was killed, and at least 72 people were injured, some severely.

=== July 12–14 (United States) ===
EFU	EF0	EF1	EF2	EF3	EF4	EF5
0	17	14	1	1	0	0

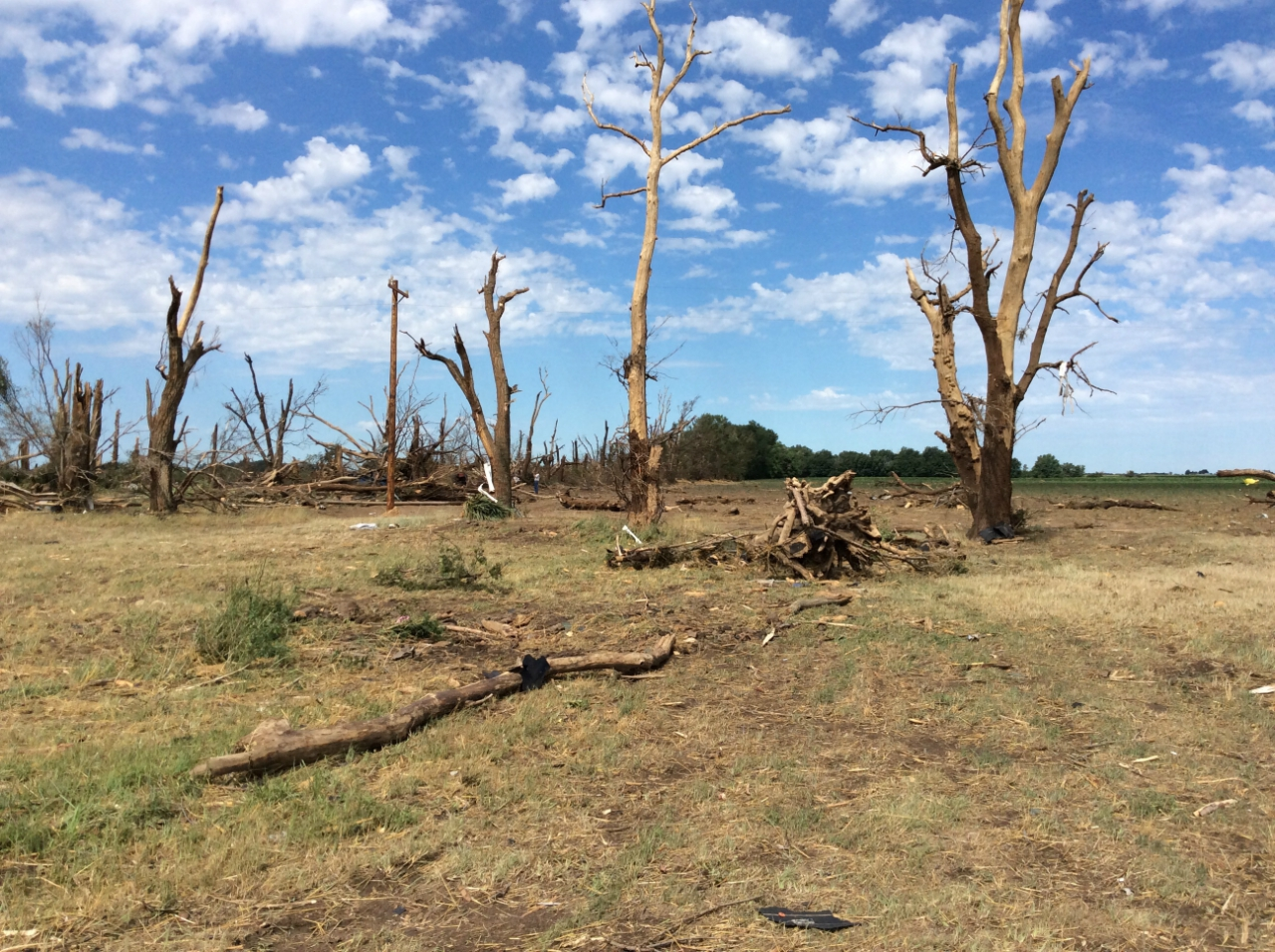
High-end EF3 tree damage near Nickerson, Kansas.

Multiple severe weather events impacted the Great Plains, Great Lakes, and Eastern Seaboard towards the middle of July. On the afternoon of July 12, clusters of intense supercells formed over North Dakota and moved southeastward into Minnesota, producing large hail, damaging winds, and tornadoes. This included a strong EF2 tornado that passed near Aldrich, Minnesota. The supercells then merged into a long-lived, intense derecho that moved swiftly southeastward from Wisconsin and Illinois through the Ohio and Tennessee Valleys into the Southeastern United States on July 13, producing hundreds of wind damage reports over a 900 miles (1,400 km) stretch. One person was injured in Zionsville, Indiana, when a tree fell on their vehicle. The derecho also produced a couple of brief, weak tornadoes in Kentucky while an additional weak tornado was spawned by a short-lived supercell that formed from the outflow of the derecho. Farther to the west, an isolated, southwestward supercell produced a slow-moving, but destructive high-end EF3 stovepipe tornado near Nickerson, Kansas, completely debarking trees and cleanly sweeping away an unanchored farm home. The tornado was highly visible from the nearby town of Hutchinson, and was photographed and caught on video by many local residents. Behind the derecho in western Great Lakes region, another round of supercells moved southeastward across the region, producing damaging winds and large hail into July 14, although a few weak tornadoes also touched down in Wisconsin, Indiana, and Michigan. Later on July 14, another wave of intense severe weather affected mostly the Appalachian Mountains regions with numerous supercells, multi-cells, and bowing segments forming and moving generally southward, producing hundreds of damaging wind reports. Near Flemingsburg, Kentucky, a mobile home was destroyed after it was rolled into a group of garage buildings, injuring four people. Near West Point, Alabama, a man was killed after an uprooted tree fell on him. Another tree fell on a home near West Hampton, Georgia, injuring one person. The day also produced numerous hail reports and a dozen weak tornadoes touched down as well before the storms weakened and dissipated overnight. In all, 33 tornadoes were confirmed during the period along with almost 1000 damaging wind reports and over 150 large hail reports. Severe weather in Washington D.C. resulted in Taylor Swift modified her 1989 World Tour show there.

=== July 13 (Brazil) ===
FU	F0	F1	F2	F3	F4	F5
0	0	1	0	0	1	0

On the evening of July 13, two tornadoes struck Paraná, Brazil. One of them, being a violent F4 tornado that stuck Francisco Beltrão in the KM 8 region, destroying wooden and masonry houses, and leaving only the floor remaining of a brick house, a 5-ton truck was also thrown 50 m (160 ft), suffering severe damage to its body, the tornado also debarked several trees, all resulted in 19 people injured and no fatalities. This tornado was rated between F2–F3 by SIMEPAR, however, in November 2024, a meteorologist from PREVOTS shared that a windspeed estimate of 380 km/h (240 mph) were need to loft a 5-ton truck the whole 50 m (160 ft) distance, resulting in a F4 intensity consensus. Another tornado touched down in Mariópolis destroying 30 homes and damaging others, resulting in 50 injuries, this tornado remain unrated, however its winds were estimated in 150 km/h (93 mph), or approximately F1 intensity.

=== July 16 (United States) ===
EFU	EF0	EF1	EF2	EF3	EF4	EF5
0	3	3	3	0	0	0

A localized outbreak of nine tornadoes impacted Iowa and Illinois on the evening of July 16. A few of these tornadoes caused significant damage to towns, including a large multiple-vortex EF2 that passed near the Illinois town of Monmouth and struck the nearby town of Cameron. Homes in Cameron had their roofs ripped off, large grain bins were destroyed at a granary in town, and trees were snapped as well. Another EF2 near Kirkwood destroyed barns and outbuildings and snapped power poles along its path. The most significant tornado of the event was a damaging EF2 that heavily damaged numerous homes, completely destroyed many garages and outbuildings, and snapped numerous trees in the southern part of Delavan, Illinois. Some homes had their roofs torn off, and one had its entire second story ripped off. In total, the Delavan tornado damaged 51 homes in town, 15 of which sustained major impacts. The tornado developed and dissipated so quickly that a tornado warning was never issued.

=== July 27 (Manitoba) ===
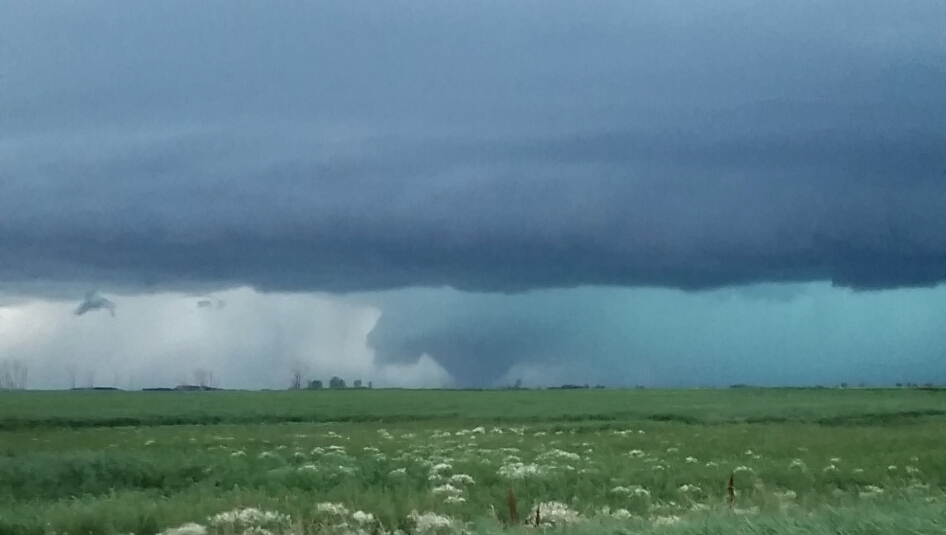
Large EF2 wedge tornado and associated wall cloud in Manitoba on July 27.

A tornadic supercell produced an extremely long-lived high-end EF2 tornado that was on the ground for up to three hours as it tracked approximately 80 kilometers (50 mi) across southern Manitoba. The tornado moved along a sharp northeasterly path, remaining over very rural areas as they passed near the towns of Pierson, Melita, Tilston, Reston, and Virden. Very few structures were impacted in this sparsely populated area, though a few farmsteads sustained some damage. Numerous trees and power poles sustained major damage along the storm track, and asphalt was scoured from a highway bridge near Melita. No injuries occurred as a result of this tornado and due to the rural nature of the affected area, no significant damage occurred.

== August ==
=== August 24 (Australia) ===
Around 5 p.m. local time, a tornado touched down near Dubbo, in the Central West region of New South Wales and in its 200 meter wide path through a semi-rural area damaged homes, sheds, and vegetation.

=== August 24 (Netherlands) ===
On the afternoon of August 24, a small but strong F2 tornado occurred near Wieringerwerf in the Netherlands. Four farms sustained damage from the tornado, and a couple of homes had their roofs torn off. Trees were downed as well.

== September ==
=== September 15–16 (Europe) ===
FU	F0	F1	F2	F3	F4	F5
1	0	3	2	0	0	0

A small outbreak of tornadoes occurred in Europe beginning on September 15, when an F1 tornado struck the town of Oldenburg in Holstein in Germany, snapping numerous trees and destroying signs. More significant tornado activity occurred on September 16, as a damaging F2 tornado struck the small village of Sonnac in southern France. Well-built homes had their roofs torn off, with some partial collapse of brick exterior walls observed. Major tree and outbuilding damage occurred as well. An F1 tornado also struck Courtenay, Loiret, causing roof and tree damage. In Belgium, an F2 tornado struck the Melreux area, severely damaging multiple farms. Structures sustained major roof damage, a car was tossed, and trees were snapped by the tornado. Two tornadoes also touched down in Luxembourg, including an F1 that destroyed several barns, and damaged a few homes and trees near Reckange. Another tornado of unknown strength caused roof damage, destroyed two garden sheds, and overturned a tractor near Bissen before striking Colmar-Berg, downing trees and injuring one person. Six tornadoes were confirmed.

=== September 24 (South Carolina) ===
On the night of September 24, an isolated supercell thunderstorm produced a large, damaging, high-end EF2 tornado that struck Johns Island, South Carolina, causing major damage in the area. Numerous homes were damaged to varying degrees, a couple of which had roofs and exterior walls ripped off. A large swath of trees was also flattened, many of which landed on houses, cars, and roadways.

== October ==
=== October 4 (China) ===
EFU	EF0	EF1	EF2	EF3	EF4	EF5
2	0	0	0	1	0	0

On October 4, multiple tornadoes spawned by the outer bands of Typhoon Mujigae impacted the Guangdong region of China, killing 7 people and injuring over 223. Three confirmed tornadoes occurred in Guangdong Province, impacting areas in or around Foshan, Guangzhou, and Shanwei. The most well-documented tornado of the event was a large EF3 that caused severe damage in Foshan, and in surrounding suburbs as well. The Foshan tornado was caught on video from multiple angles as it moved through the city, surrounded by flying debris and occasional horizontal vortices. Several factories and metal warehouse buildings were completely destroyed by the tornado, and multiple large construction cranes were toppled over onto structures. Several large metal truss transmission towers were also twisted and collapsed. Homes and apartment buildings were badly damaged along the path, and many trees and power lines were downed. Four people were killed, and 89 others were injured in the Foshan area. The Foshan tornado was the most thoroughly studied and well-documented tornado in Chinese history at the time. A damaging tornado of unknown intensity also caused significant damage in the Guangzhou suburbs of Nancun and Shiqi, killing three people and injuring 134. Homes were reportedly ripped apart and vehicles were overturned along the path of this tornado. The Shanwei area tornado began as a waterspout before moving onto land, causing unspecified damage and no injuries or fatalities. The Canton Tower had to be evacuated during a blackout throughout the whole province during the storms.

=== October 30–31 (United States) ===
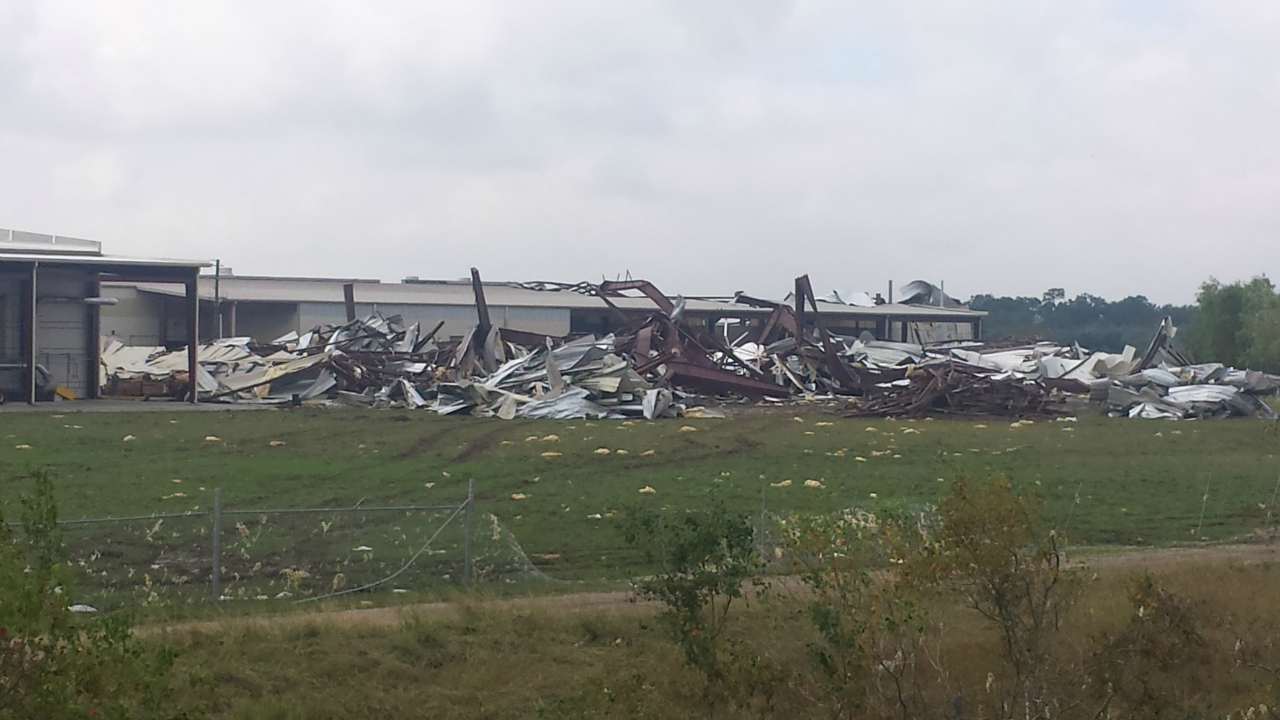
EF2 damage to an industrial building in Pasadena, Texas.

EFU	EF0	EF1	EF2	EF3	EF4	EF5
0	12	8	4	0	0	0

A small tornado outbreak occurred across Texas, Louisiana, and Mississippi during a major flooding event. The first two tornadoes touched down in southern Texas during the early morning hours of the 30th, including an EF1 in Los Coyotes that was caught on surveillance video lifting a barn from its foundation and destroying it. Other outbuildings and trees sustained damage along the path as well. Another EF0 near Willamar knocked over a cotton seed holder and snapped tree limbs. More intense tornado activity occurred later on the 30th, as tornadoes impacted areas in and around the greater Austin and Houston areas, a few of which were strong. An EF0 struck the town of D'Hanis early in the morning, causing tree and roof damage throughout town. One frail, older brick building in the downtown area had its second story collapse. The town of Floresville sustained a direct hit from a strong EF2 tornado, where extensive tree and roof damage occurred, a billboard was collapsed, and recreational vehicles were thrown and destroyed, including one that was lifted and deposited on the roof of a three-story hotel. The local high school was severely damaged, sustaining two major exterior wall collapses on the second floor, as well as partial collapse of its roof. Another EF2 tornado damaged at least 25 homes near the town of Geronimo. Some of the homes sustained total roof loss, and mobile homes were rolled and destroyed. Numerous trees were downed, and outbuildings, garages, and pieces of farm equipment were damaged or destroyed as well.

During the early morning of October 31, ten tornadoes touched down in the densely populated Houston Metropolitan Area. An EF0 tornado struck a mobile home park near Alvin, causing minor damage to 20 mobile homes and overturning one of them, injuring the couple inside. An EF1 tornado also occurred near Manvel destroying a mobile home and damaging 5 others, injuring three people. Another EF0 tornado caused roof damage to the Brazos Mall in Lake Jackson. One tornado struck the Houston suburb of Friendswood, causing mostly moderate tree and roof damage, though one well-built house had most of its roof torn off, warranting an EF2 rating. Another strong tornado began at the southeast edge of Pasadena before tearing through densely populated areas of La Porte. The most intense damage occurred in Pasadena, where a metal-frame industrial building was destroyed at EF2 strength. Significant tree and roof damage occurred in La Porte, where one home had most of its roof torn off and another was shifted off of its foundation. Many other homes sustained lesser damage. A third EF0 also touched down later in the morning, causing minor damage to homes in Highlands and Barrett. Tornadoes continued to touch down in areas further east later in the day, as weak tornadoes touched down in Louisiana and Mississippi. An EF0 tornado struck residential areas of Hattiesburg, Mississippi, causing minor tree and roof damage. Overall, this outbreak produced 24 tornadoes, though no fatalities occurred.

== November ==
=== November 1 (Australia) ===
A severe spring storm outbreak over eastern Australia caused one or possibly more tornadoes in northern Victoria. A multiple-vortex tornado was filmed in Nathalia, causing severe damage to farm buildings. Possibly the same tornado uprooted trees and damaged ten homes, destroying three in nearby Strathmerton.

=== November 11 (Iowa) ===
EFU	EF0	EF1	EF2	EF3	EF4	EF5
0	9	11	2	0	0	0

On Veterans Day, a powerful low-pressure system spawned a localized tornado outbreak, mainly across parts of central Iowa. Most of these tornadoes were weak, though a few were strong or caused considerable damage. This included an EF2 tornado that caused heavy damage to rural properties near Rathbun Lake, tearing roofs off of homes, shifting other homes off of their foundations, destroying outbuildings, and snapping power poles. Another EF2 tornado destroyed a well-built barn near the beginning of its path before weakening and striking Barnes City, Iowa, as an EF1, resulting in moderate tree and outbuilding damage in town. EF1 tornadoes also struck the Iowa towns of Le Claire and Knoxville, causing moderate damage. One EF0 tornado was observed and reported by air traffic controllers as it caused minor damage at the Des Moines International Airport. Overall, the outbreak produced 22 tornadoes and no fatalities or injuries.

=== November 16–18 (United States) ===
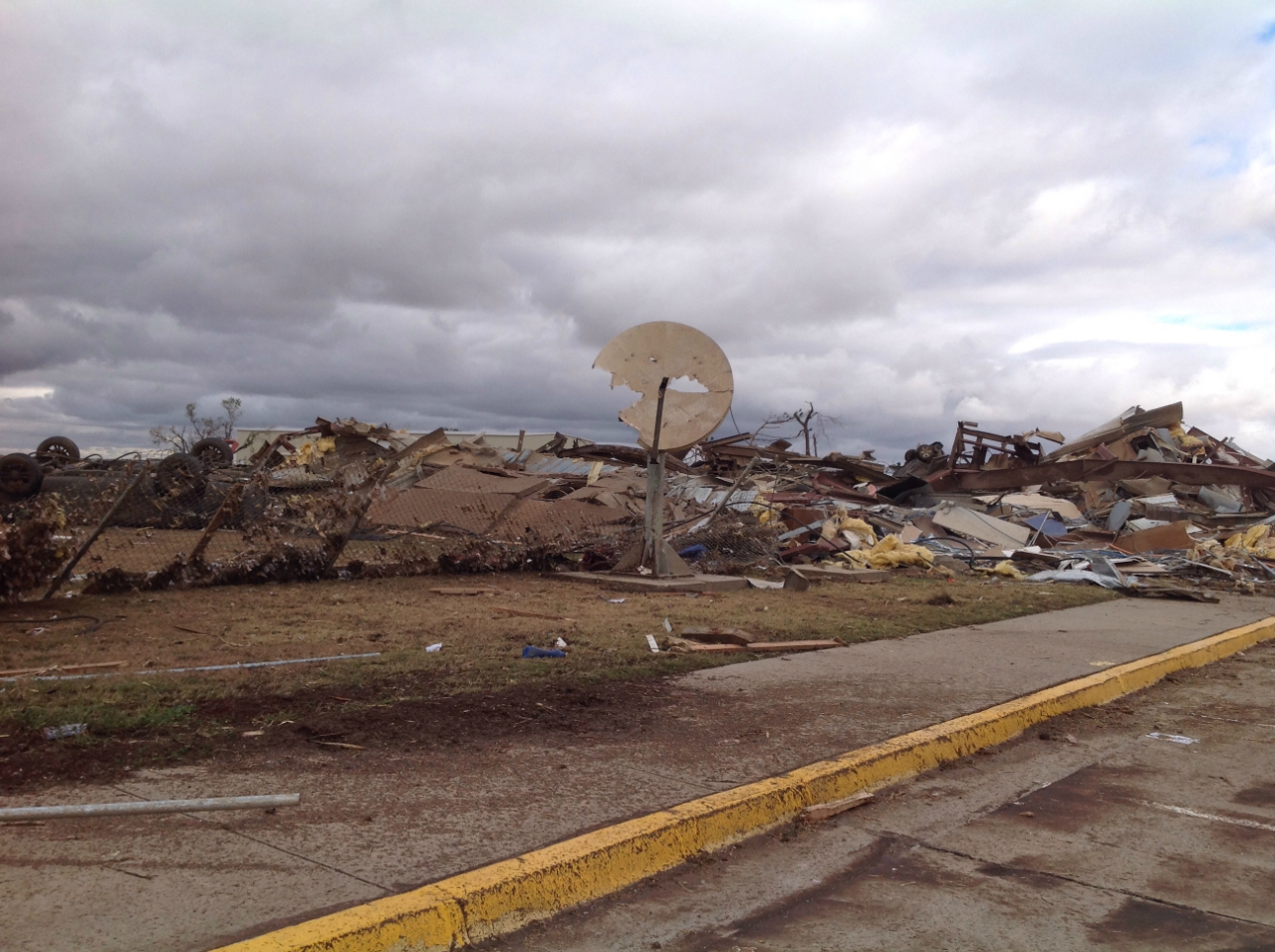
Building at a chemical plant that was leveled by the second EF3 tornado near Pampa, Texas.

EFU	EF0	EF1	EF2	EF3	EF4	EF5
0	23	30	5	3	0	0

On November 16, an unusual late-season nocturnal tornado outbreak produced numerous tornadoes in parts of Texas, Oklahoma, Kansas, and Nebraska during the late evening and overnight hours. A long-track EF3 wedge tornado began northeast of Liberal, Kansas, and moved along a 51-mile-long (82 km) path through several counties before dissipating near Montezuma, causing extensive damage to farmsteads and trees along the path. Trees were partially debarked and denuded, homes were heavily damaged, a well-built metal frame hog containment building was obliterated, and a heavy steel oil tank was thrown by this strong tornado. Another large EF2 wedge tornado spawned by the same supercell caused considerable damage in rural areas between the towns of Ensign and Cimarron as well. A separate supercell storm also produced an EF2 tornado that caused damage to farms near Ness City as well. The towns of Grainfield and Lenora sustained direct hits from EF1 tornadoes, resulting in moderate damage at both locations. Further to the south, a large EF3 wedge tornado passed to the southeast of Pampa, Texas, before dissipating near Miami, debarking trees, toppling metal high-tension truss towers, and causing some ground scouring as it passed through rural areas. A well-anchored mobile home was completely swept away with little debris recovered, and nearby heavy farm equipment along with a two-ton truck were thrown 150 yards away.

Shortly after the initial Pampa tornado, a second large EF3 passed to the southeast of the city, missing densely populated areas by just three miles. This large cone tornado leveled a large chemical plant complex on the outskirts of town, tossed vehicles, and destroyed a manufactured home. The destruction of the chemical plant complex resulted in a major gas leak and chemical spill, prompting a Hazmat team to respond. A large EF2 tornado passed near Groom, heavily damaging a frame home, destroying a well-built metal frame outbuilding, and moving a flat-bed truck 50 yards, while another EF2 heavily damaged a well service rig near Seminole. As the supercells crossed into the Oklahoma panhandle later that night, additional tornadoes touched down, including an EF2 that caused damage near the town of Fort Supply. Many other tornadoes were sighted in rural areas across the four states that night as well, though they remained mostly over open country and caused minimal damage. Due to the highly anomalous time of year and geographical locations of the outbreak, the National Weather Service office in Dodge City, Kansas, described the event as being "unprecedented in recorded history for southwest Kansas". The parent storm system went on to produce additional weak tornadoes across the southern United States on the 17th and 18th, some of which impacted suburbs of Dallas and Atlanta. Overall, the outbreak produced 61 tornadoes, though no fatalities occurred.

=== November 19 (Brazil) ===
FU	F0	F1	F2	F3	F4	F5
0	1	0	2	0	0	0

Three different tornadoes struck three municipalities in the late afternoon: Marechal Cândido Rondon, in the state of Paraná (F2); Chapecó (F2) and Treze Tílias (F0), both from the state of Santa Catarina. In Marechal Cândido Rondon, an F2 tornado left 20 people injured; several trees were toppled and approximately 1500 houses were damaged, causing the disruption of the electricity service for 14,000 people. In Chapecó, an F2 tornado damaged 20 roofs, partially destroyed 6 masonry houses, and completely demolished another four. Four people were injured and the electricity service was cut in the evening. In Treze Tílias, an F0 tornado downed several trees and destroyed 10 roofs; a hospital was flooded and the electricity service was disrupted at 7:00 pm local time (UTC−02:00).

== December ==
=== December 12 (United States) ===
EFU	EF0	EF1	EF2	EF3	EF4	EF5
0	2	2	4	0	0	0

A localized outbreak of eight tornadoes impacted parts of Oklahoma and Texas on December 12. This included three EF2 tornadoes caused considerable damage in Texas, the first of which struck the town of Lindale and damaged roughly 50 homes. Another EF2 caused major damage to large industrial buildings and RVs near Willis, while a third damaged or destroyed homes and mobile homes near the towns of Pickton and Saltillo, injuring two. Three people were also injured by an EF2 tornado that damaged 16 homes and destroyed 4 mobile homes near Valliant, Oklahoma.

=== December 16 (Australia) ===
A rain-wrapped high-end EF2 tornado spawned by a violent supercell hit parts of southern Sydney, New South Wales around 10:30am AEST. The suburb of Kurnell was hardest hit, with a confirmed wind gust of 213 km/h (132 mph) associated with the tornado. Numerous houses were partially destroyed, a major shopping center and desalination plant were also damaged, whilst many trees were snapped and boats and trucks were reportedly flipped. Tennis ball sized hail and flash flooding with rainfall up to 144 mm (5.7 in) in an hour was also recorded from the same storm system, with damage reported across the Greater Sydney Area and the Illawarra.

=== December 23–25 (United States) ===
EFU	EF0	EF1	EF2	EF3	EF4	EF5
0	12	16	5	2	1	0

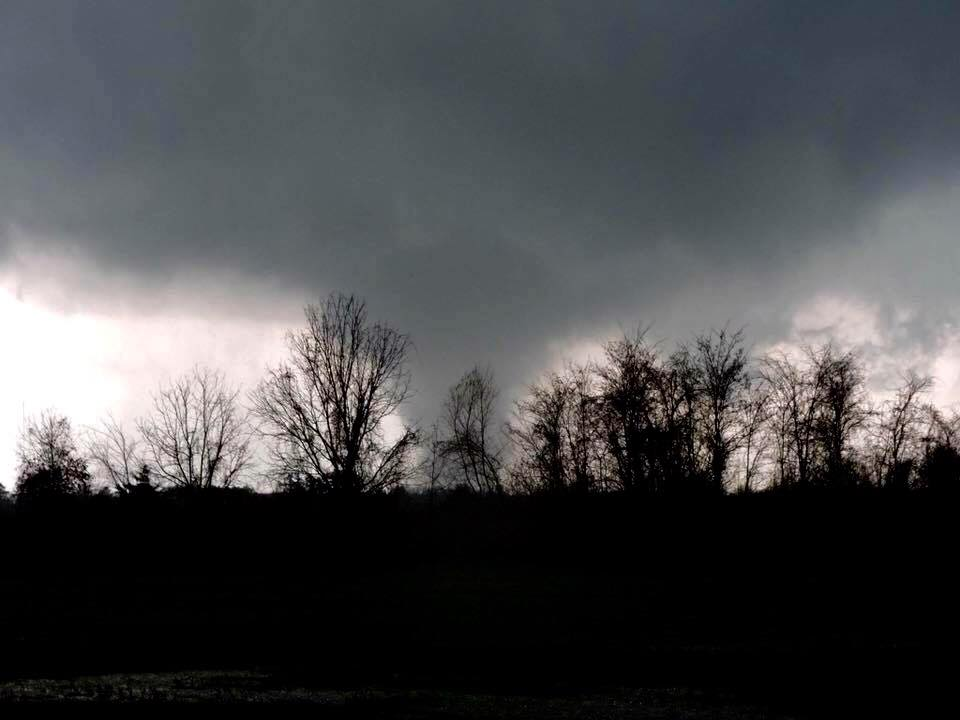
An EF3 tornado near Clarksdale, Mississippi on December 23.

On the evening of December 23, a significant tornado outbreak affected the Midwest and South, producing tornadoes mainly across Illinois, Michigan, Indiana, Mississippi, Alabama, and Tennessee. One of the first tornadoes of the event was an EF1 tornado that touched down in Greenwood, Indiana, where several homes sustained damage. Another EF1 tornado caused damage to homes in the Indianapolis suburb of Noblesville. Two other tornadoes were reported in Indiana - an additional EF1 near the Rush County/Decatur County Line and an EF0 in Wayne County near Fountaintown. In Illinois, an EF1 tornado destroyed outbuildings and downed trees near the town of Sciota. The outbreak also spawned the only known tornado to touch down in Michigan during the month of December, an EF1 that struck the Detroit suburb of Canton, causing considerable damage to vehicles, an industrial park, and a gas station. Farther south, a strong EF2 tornado occurred near Marianna, Arkansas, completely destroying mobile homes, tearing roofs off of frame homes, and damaging cabins in the area.

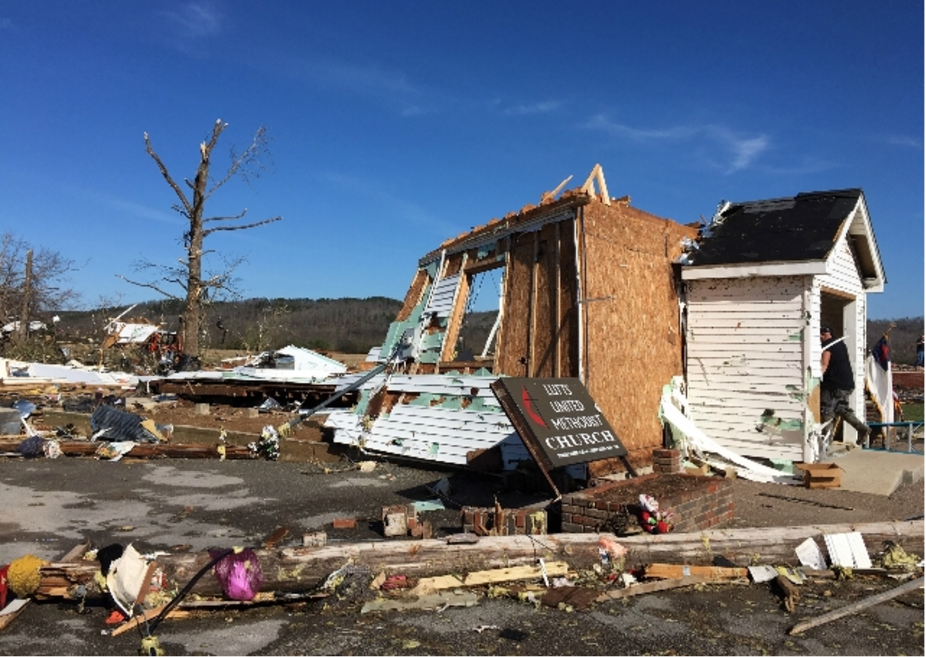
EF3 damage to a church in Lutts, Tennessee.

A large, destructive high-end EF3 tornado touched down south of Clarksdale, Mississippi, killing two people and severely damaging or destroying about 15 homes in that area. The tornado continued to the northeast, later snapping trees and destroying homes near Marks and Como before dissipating. The parent supercell that produced the Clarksdale tornado then produced a new tornado, a violent wedge that grew to nearly a mile wide and devastated the southern edge of Holly Springs, where two people were killed and a motorsports park and many homes were destroyed. Additional people were killed further along the path near Ashland and Canaan as well, where the tornado reached EF4 intensity. Homes were swept away and pavement was scoured from roads in this area. The tornado killed another person near Walnut before it eventually crossed into Tennessee, destroying homes near Middleton and Selmer before lifting. The Holly Springs/Ashland tornado killed 9 people in all. Another destructive EF3 tornado struck the small community of Lutts, Tennessee, after dark, destroying homes and a church, and completely flattening the local post office. Significant tornado activity continued through parts of Mississippi and Tennessee overnight, including an EF2 tornado near Linden that downed many trees and killed an elderly couple in their small, unanchored home. More tornadoes were reported the following day and on Christmas as well, including a high-end EF2 tornado that destroyed homes in Birmingham. Overall, the outbreak resulted in 38 tornadoes and 13 deaths.

=== December 26–28 (United States) ===
EFU	EF0	EF1	EF2	EF3	EF4	EF5
0	10	17	3	1	1	0

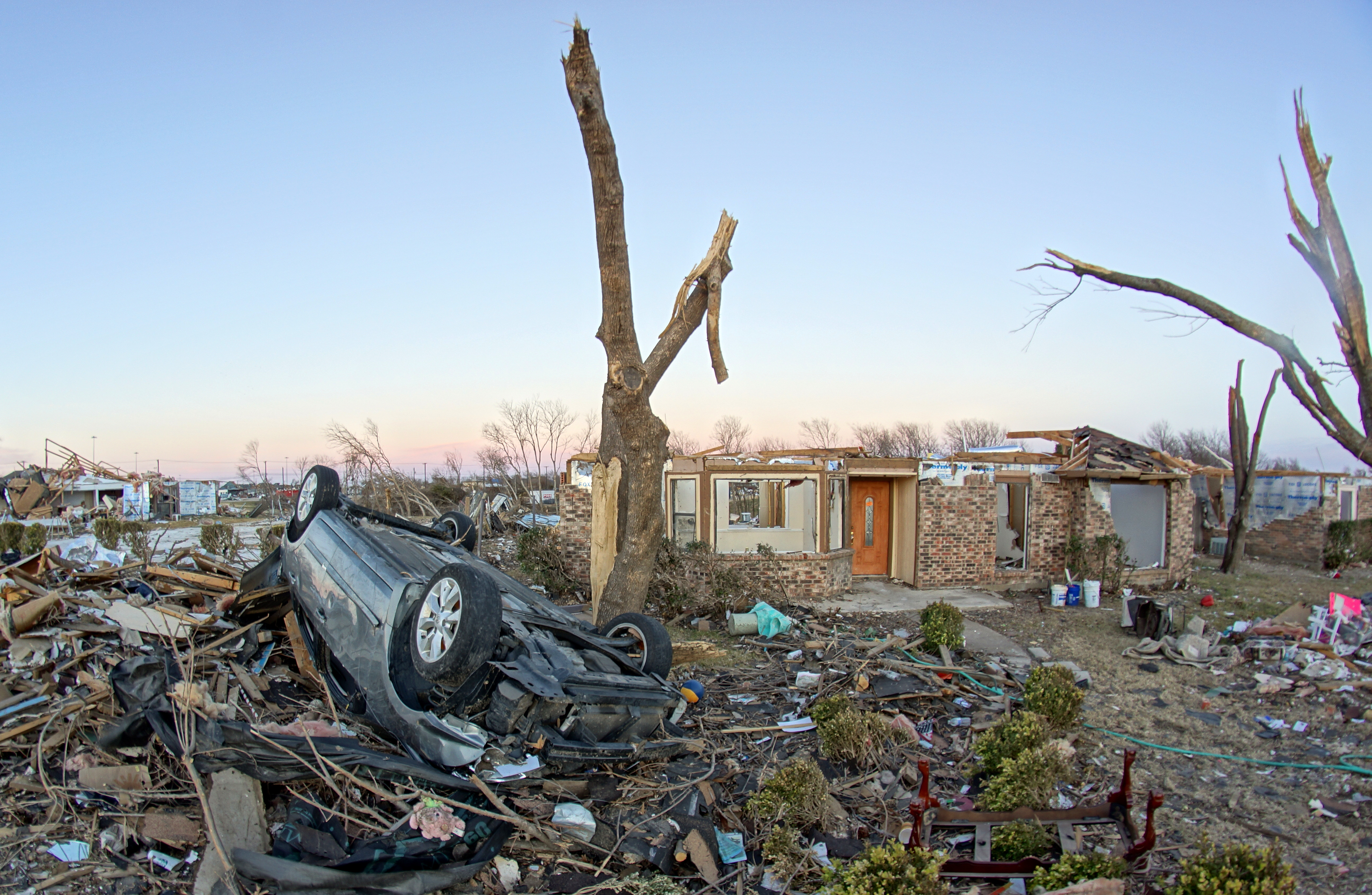
Damage in a residential area as a result of the EF4 Garland/Rowlett, Texas tornado.

On the evening of December 26, a series of destructive tornadoes impacted areas in and around the Dallas–Fort Worth metroplex, resulting in fatalities and major damage across densely populated areas. An EF3 tornado ripped through subdivisions in Ovilla and neighboring Glenn Heights, destroying numerous homes, two churches, and severely damaging a school building. Later that evening, a large EF4 wedge tornado touched down in northeastern Dallas County with major damage occurring in Garland and Rowlett. The Garland/Rowlett tornado completely destroyed numerous homes and vehicles along its path, and killed 10 people. Later that night, an EF2 tornado killed two people and caused major damage in Copeville, while an EF1 caused another fatality near Blue Ridge, leaving a total of 13 tornado related fatalities and making the event the deadliest tornado disaster in the Dallas–Fort Worth metroplex since the Dallas tornado of 1957. The parent storm system went on to produce several other tornadoes across the Southern United States throughout the next two days, including the second tornado to cause EF2 damage near Marianna, Arkansas, within a six-day period. Overall, the storm system produced 32 tornadoes, along with significant snowfall and flooding.

== See also ==
- Weather of 2015
- Tornado
  - Tornadoes by year
  - Tornado records
  - Tornado climatology
  - Tornado myths
- List of tornado outbreaks
  - List of F5 and EF5 tornadoes
  - List of F4 and EF4 tornadoes
  - List of North American tornadoes and tornado outbreaks
  - List of 21st-century Canadian tornadoes and tornado outbreaks
  - List of European tornadoes and tornado outbreaks
  - List of tornadoes and tornado outbreaks in Asia
  - List of Southern Hemisphere tornadoes and tornado outbreaks
  - List of tornadoes striking downtown areas
  - List of tornadoes with confirmed satellite tornadoes
- Tornado intensity
  - Fujita scale
  - Enhanced Fujita scale
  - International Fujita scale
  - TORRO scale
