= 2015 Garland–Rowlett tornado =

EF4 tornado in suburbs of Dallas, Texas

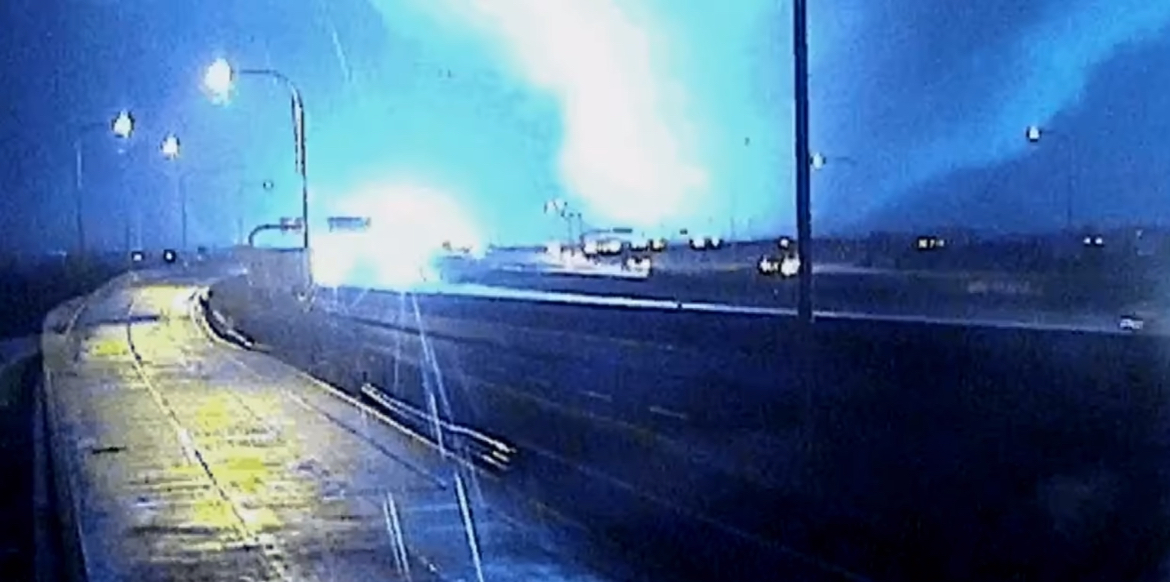
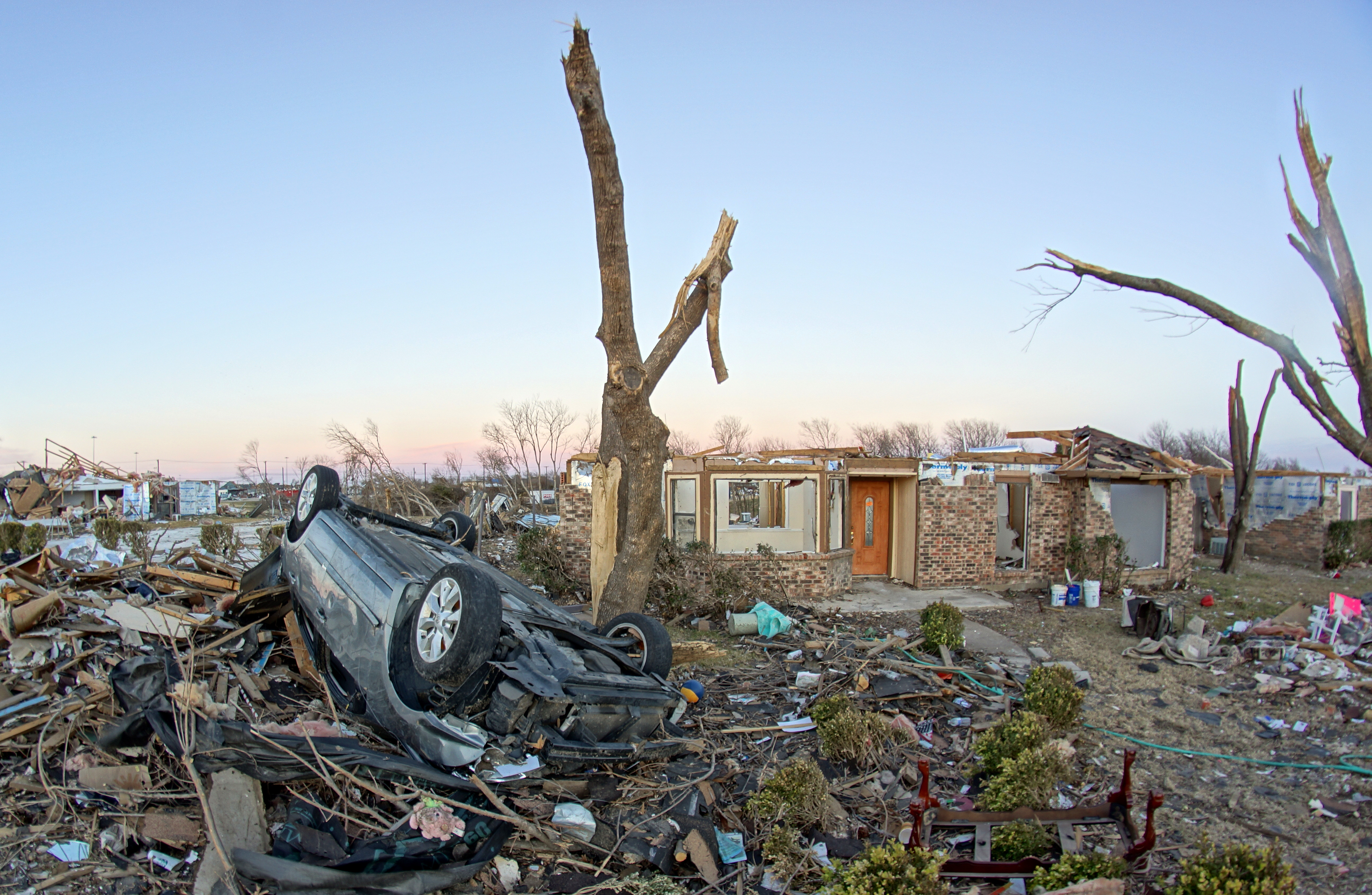
- Top: The 2015 Garland tornado that would kill 10, as seen looming over a highway. A power flash is visible to the left.; Bottom: EF3 damage to homes in Rowlett.

Meteorological history
- Formed: December 26, 2015, 6:46 p.m. CST (UTC–06:00)
- Dissipated: December 26, 2015, 7:02 p.m. CST (UTC–06:00)
- Duration: 16 minutes

EF4 tornado
- on the Enhanced Fujita scale
- Highest winds: 180 mph (290 km/h)

Overall effects
- Fatalities: 10
- Injuries: 468
- Damage: $26.8 million (2015 USD)
- Areas affected: Dallas and Rockwall County, Texas
- Part of the December 2015 North American storm complex and Tornadoes of 2015

On the night of December 26, 2015, a violent EF4 tornado struck the Dallas suburbs of Sunnyvale, Garland, and Rowlett, located in Texas. It caused $20–26 million (2015 USD) in damages, killed 10 people, making it the deadliest tornado in the United States in 2015, and injured 468 others. This was the third tornado to be rated an EF4 in the United States that year and the fourth such tornado worldwide.

The tornado first touched down at 6:46 p.m. CST and slowly began to intensify in strength while approaching Sunnyvale. As the tornado moved into Garland, it became violent, inflicting heavy damage on structures and vehicles. As the tornado crossed a highway, it struck a turnpike, where nine people who were sheltering in their vehicles were killed. Another man was killed when his house collapsed before the tornado lifted at 7:02 p.m., in Rockwall County. The tornado was the deadliest tornado ever to hit in the month of December in Texas, and one of the deadliest December tornadoes to hit the United States on record, alongside the 1953 Vicksburg, Mississippi tornado, the 1957 Gorham-Murphysboro, Illinois tornado, the 2000 Tuscaloosa tornado, the 2021 Western Kentucky tornado, and the 2015 Holly Springs-Ashland tornado that had occurred just three days before this event.

== Meteorological Synopsis ==
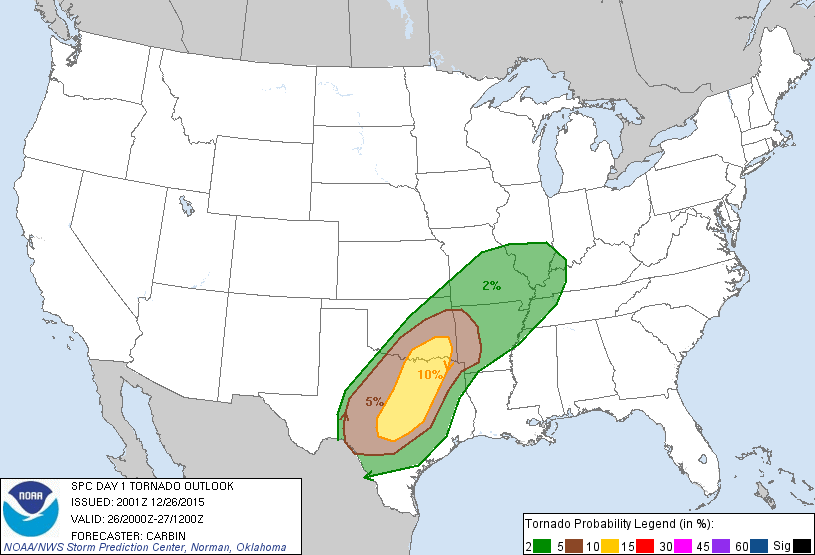
Tornado Outlook on December 26, 2015

Prior to December 26th, 2015, the atmosphere was potent, with a strong upper-level trough throughout much of the Central and Southern Plains, accompanied by a large low-pressure area that crossed into the area from Mexico, resulting in a strong upper-level low that drew moisture from the Gulf of Mexico, with high dew points of 60 to 70 degrees. In the morning of December 26th, strong, low-level shear was recorded at 50 kts, as well as a looping 1 km hodograph that resulted in storm-relative helicity values upwards of 300 m2/s2. Additionally, MUCAPE values of 1793 J/kg created a capping inversion that somewhat limited tornado potential. By noon, the previous capping inversion had completely disappeared due to an increase in MUCAPE values to 2878 J/kg as a result of drastic increase in moisture from the gulf. In addition, hodographs continued to show a high probability for discrete supercells, and light cloud coverage in areas heated the ground in areas, further increasing instability.

The National Weather Service, who had noted a growing potential for severe weather as early as December 23rd, issued an enhanced risk for much of Northern Texas on the 23rd, with a 10% chance of tornadoes stretching from the Texas-Oklahoma border to portions of Central Texas. At 12:35 p.m., the NWS issued a tornado watch for Dallas County and the surrounding counties. By 1:43 p.m. supercells began to produce their first tornadoes, with the supercell that formed the Garland tornado forming by 4:50 p.m. The supercell would produce a few tornadoes, including one near the exurb of Waxahachie, before drastically increasing in intensity and becoming dominant around 6:40 p.m., producing the EF4 in Garland 6 minutes later.

== Tornado summary ==
The tornado first touched down on December 26, 2015, at 6:46 p.m. CST, on East Tripp Road north of US 80 west of Sunnyvale in Dallas County. The tornado produced minor roof damage to two homes in this area, and a power pole was knocked down near the tornado's initial touchdown point. The National Weather Service determined that the damage in this area was consistent with an EF0-strength tornado. Heading in a northeastward direction, the tornado began to slowly widen as it moved through mainly empty lots, although some EF0 damage occurred. After crossing Hearthstone Drive, the tornado rapidly strengthened to EF2 intensity. Several homes suffered severe roof and exterior wall damage, including some homes that were partially unroofed, vehicles were damaged, fences were knocked down, and trees were snapped. The tornado then weakened to EF1 intensity as it crossed Eagles Crest Drive, continuing to inflict roof damage to homes and damaging trees. The tornado then crossed Town East Boulevard and moved through unpopulated fields and wooded areas. There were few damage indicators in this area and an EF0 rating was given along this portion of the track.

After crossing Barnes Bridge Road, the tornado rapidly intensified to EF2 strength and struck the Plantation Place Dallas RV Park. Several RVs were severely damaged, including some that were flipped and others that were obliterated, including at least one destroyed RV that was thrown into a pond in the park. Vehicles were tossed and trees were damaged in the area as well. The tornado then entered the southeastern part of Garland and further intensified to EF3 strength briefly on Christina Lane. Several homes suffered extensive damage with roofs partially or completely removed and exterior walls damaged or knocked down. One unanchored home was swept off its foundation, while another saw more than half of the structure collapse. Vehicles were thrown and damaged, including a pickup truck that had its bed partially lifted off its axle and a box truck that was knocked over, a light pole was bent to the ground, and more trees and fences were damaged or knocked down. The tornado then weakened but remained strong as it continued northeastward at EF2 strength as it passed through residential areas. Many homes suffered severe roof and exterior wall damage, including some homes that were partially to completely unroofed and/or had exterior walls knocked down, and trees were damaged or snapped.

As the tornado crossed Bobtown Road, it rapidly intensified and became violent, moving through another residential area at EF4 intensity. Many homes in this area were heavily damaged or completely destroyed, including at least one home that was flattened on Crestpoint Lane. After crossing Kelso Lane, the tornado weakened slightly, but remained intense as it continued through residential areas at EF3 intensity. More homes were heavily damaged or destroyed with roofs removed and some to all exterior walls knocked down; some homes also had multiple interior walls knocked down. At least one home had a pickup truck thrown into it and some homes were partially swept away as well, although they were either unanchored or poorly anchored to their foundations, precluding a higher rating.

A traffic camera video of the tornado moving over a highway in southern Garland

The tornado then became violent again and reached EF4 intensity as it struck an apartment complex after crossing Locust Grove Road. Several single- or multi-story apartment buildings were heavily damaged or destroyed with upper and lower floor walls knocked down and roofs removed. One apartment building was completely flattened, a storage facility next to the complex was completely destroyed, and trees and power poles were snapped. All the apartment buildings left standing after the tornado struck were later condemned and torn down. The tornado then became deadly as it struck the I-30 and President George Bush Turnpike interchange. It tossed several vehicles and towed trailers off the elevated bridge ramps and into the traffic below. Nine people, including a one-year-old, were killed in this area. It also knocked down highway signs, bent and destroyed at least one large light pole that illuminated the interchange, and snapped trees. The tornado was rapidly weakening as it crossed through the interchange and it struck another RV park at EF1 intensity after crossing it, damaging trees and RVs in the area.

Beyond the RV park, the tornado continued northeastward and moved over Lake Ray Hubbard; because it struck no damage indicators on the lake, this segment was rated EF0. Upon coming ashore in the eastern part of Rowlett, the tornado reached EF3 intensity as it struck another neighborhood. Homes suffered extensive damage with roofs partially to completely removed and exterior walls knocked down. At least one home was completely flattened, at least one car was flipped, and trees were damaged or snapped. The tornado then continued northeastward through residential areas at EF2 intensity, continuing to partially to completely unroof and knock down the exterior walls of homes with others suffering moderate roof damage, and snapping trees and power poles. The tornado then regained EF3 intensity again on Channel Drive, where a home was mostly destroyed, a car was flipped, and more trees were snapped. The tornado retained EF3 intensity as it continued northeastward, heavily damaging or destroying more homes, including some that were flattened, and snapping or uprooting trees. It also struck a mobile home park, rolling and destroying multiple mobile homes. An elderly man would die in Rowlett after his home collapsed on him. The tornado then began a rapid weakening trend after it crossed Lake Bend Drive and approached SH-66, dropping to EF0 intensity by the time it reached and crossed SH-66 as it moved into Rockwall County. The tornado continued to cause EF0 damage before moving back out over Lake Ray Hubbard. The tornado then narrowed and dissipated over the lake at 7:02 pm CST, ending its 13.04-mile-journey (20.99 km). The tornado was on the ground for 13 minutes and had a peak width of 550 yards (500 m). In all, 10 people were killed, 468 others were injured, and the damage caused was estimated to be $20–26 million (2015 USD).

== Aftermath ==
The supercell that produced this EF4 tornado had first produced an EF3 tornado that injured 46 people in the Ovilla and Red Oak areas. The EF4 tornado was the strongest, deadliest, and first fatal tornado ever recorded in Dallas County during the month of December since modern records began in 1950. After the violent tornado had lifted, the same storm produced an EF2 tornado that killed two people and injured 119 others in and around Copeville. After producing an EF1 tornado near Farmersville after the Copeville tornado, the storm would produce one final EF1 tornado that killed an infant and injured two other people near Blue Ridge before weakening and dissipating.

In Dallas County, more than 600 homes and businesses were either severely damaged or destroyed. As many as 50,000 power outages were caused by the tornado and associated storm. A total of 10 people died as a direct result of the tornado, nine of which occurred on the President George Bush Turnpike and I-30 where people were inside of vehicles. The ages of the victims here ranged from 1 to 77 years of age. One 77-year-old male was also killed in Rowlett while sheltering in a home. Many whose homes were destroyed by the tornado took shelter in gas stations and 41 took shelter in the Gale Fields Recreation Center.

Following the tornado, first responder efforts were hampered by rain, wind and cold. Multiple organizations, including the Salvation Army and Humanity First arrived to provide food, clothing and shelter to those affected. President Barack Obama declared a major disaster in the state of Texas, sending federal funding to the affected counties, as well as providing cheaper housing and repairs to anyone who lost their home or suffered damage as a result of the tornado. Gregg Abott delivered his prayers and emphasized his support for those impacted. The city enacted a 24-hour curfew to keep roads clear to aid with search-and-rescue operations. As a result of the tornado, preparedness and safety significantly improved, with new sirens and a new operations center being installed.

In 2023, tornado expert Thomas P. Grazulis unofficially rated the tornado EF3 and stated the maximum width of the tornado was 400 yards (370 m).

== See also ==
- Weather of 2015
- 2015 Rochelle–Fairdale tornado – another EF4 tornado that struck Illinois earlier the same year
- List of North American tornadoes and tornado outbreaks
- List of F4 and EF4 tornadoes
  - List of F4 and EF4 tornadoes (2010–2019)
- Tornado outbreak of May 7–9, 1927 – Also spawned an F4 tornado in Garland

== Bibliography ==
- Marshall, Timothy P.; Fox, Mark; Huffman, Melissa; Cavanaugh, Dennis (August 1, 2016). "Damage survey of the North Texas Tornadoes: December 26, 2015". Texas Tech University – via ResearchGate.
