= 2015 Holly Springs–Ashland tornado =

EF4 tornado in Mississippi during December 2015

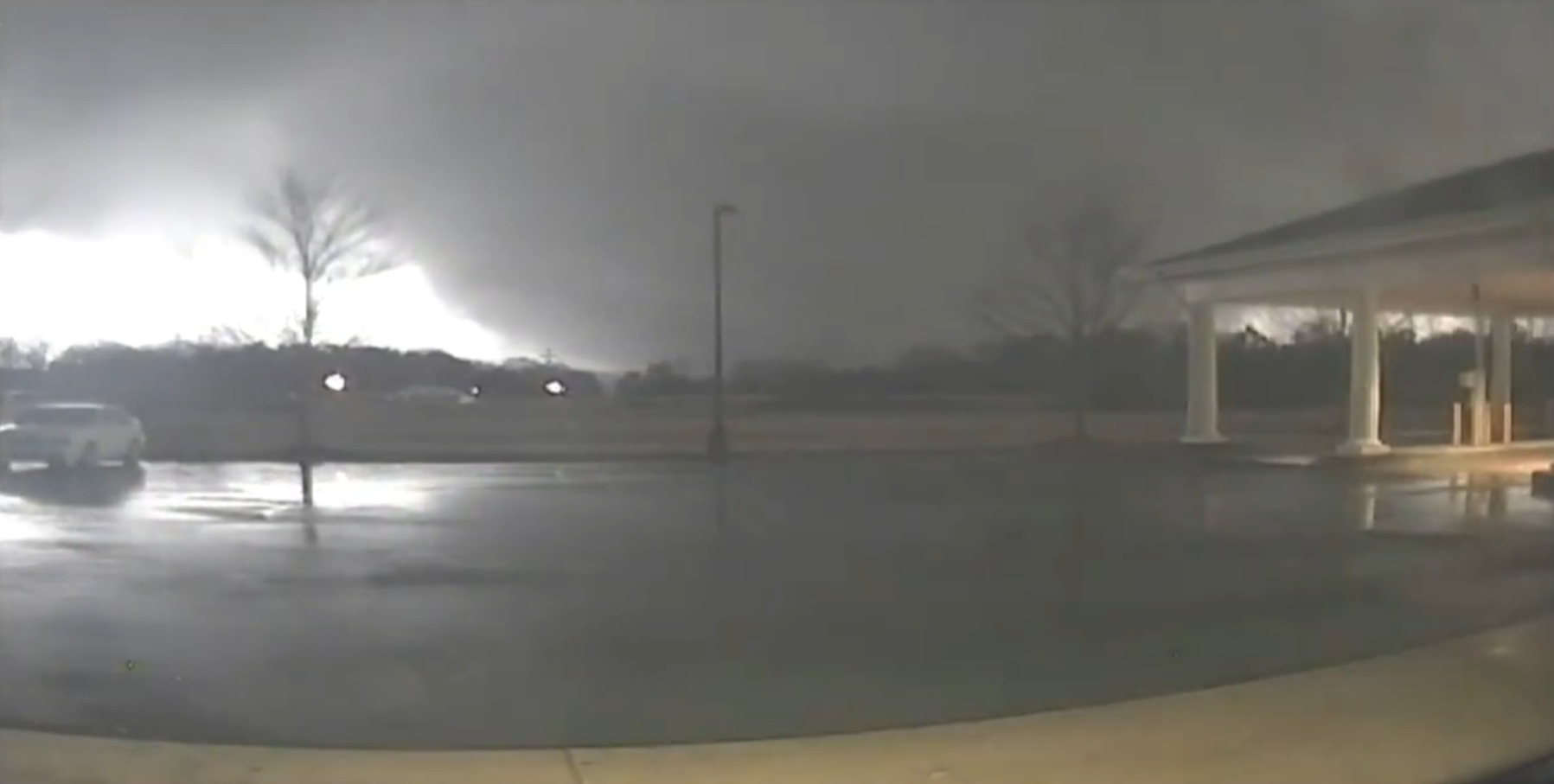
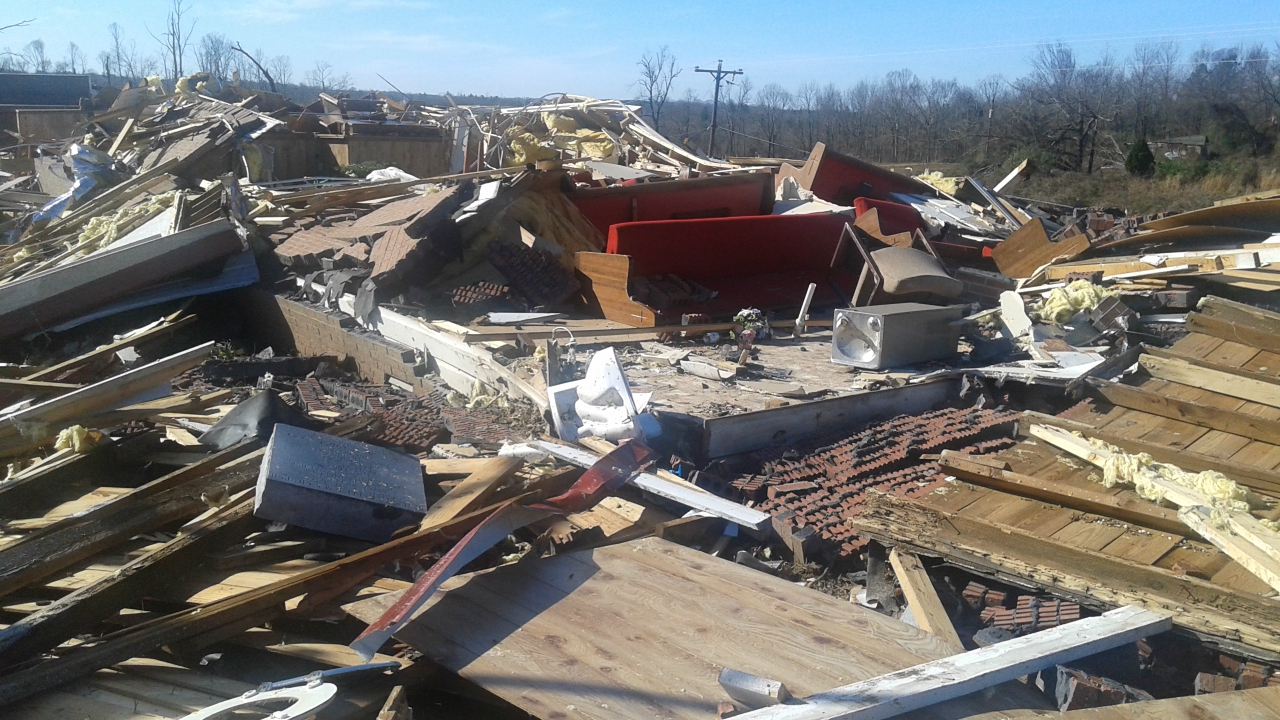
- Clockwise from top: A CCTV still of the wedge tornado in Holly Springs, Mississippi, EF3 damage to a church in Holly Springs, Mississippi.

Meteorological history
- Formed: December 23, 2015, 4:10 pm CST (UTC−06:00)
- Dissipated: December 23, 2015, 5:25 pm CST (UTC−06:00)
- Duration: 1 hour, 15 minutes

EF4 tornado
- on the Enhanced Fujita scale
- Max width: 1,300 yards (0.74 mi; 1.2 km)
- Path length: 75.09 miles (120.85 km)
- Highest winds: 170 mph (270 km/h)

Overall effects
- Fatalities: 9
- Injuries: 36
- Damage: $10.9 million (2024 USD)
- Part of the tornado outbreak of December 23–25, 2015 and tornadoes of 2015

On the evening of December 23, 2015, a large, violent, and deadly late-season tornado impacted the communities of Chulahoma, Holly Springs, Ashland in Mississippi and Selmer in Tennessee. This tornado resulted in nine fatalities and 36 injuries. This was the only violent tornado of a larger outbreak, and one of the four violent tornadoes of the 2015 tornado season.

The tornado touched down near Tyro and crossed into Marshall County, intensifying to low-end EF3 strength south of Chulahoma, leveling a couple of homes and blowing away mobile homes. A tornado emergency was issued for Holly Springs. The tornado caused major damage in the southern parts of Holly Springs, demolishing a church, damaging or destroying multiple homes, and overturning numerous vehicles. The tornado continued to cause high-end EF3 damage in Benton County, killing many people in the county. In northeast Benton County, the tornado became violent, sweeping away a large home near Hamilton.

The tornado continued onward, weakening to EF3 strength as it crossed into Tennessee, destroying a large metal building and further damaging and destroying numerous homes in Southern Tennessee before dissipating south of Selmer. The tornado traveled 75.09 mi (120.85 km) and peaked at low-end EF4 intensity. The tornado caused $10.9 million in damage and resulted in nine fatalities and 36 injuries.

== Meteorological synopsis ==
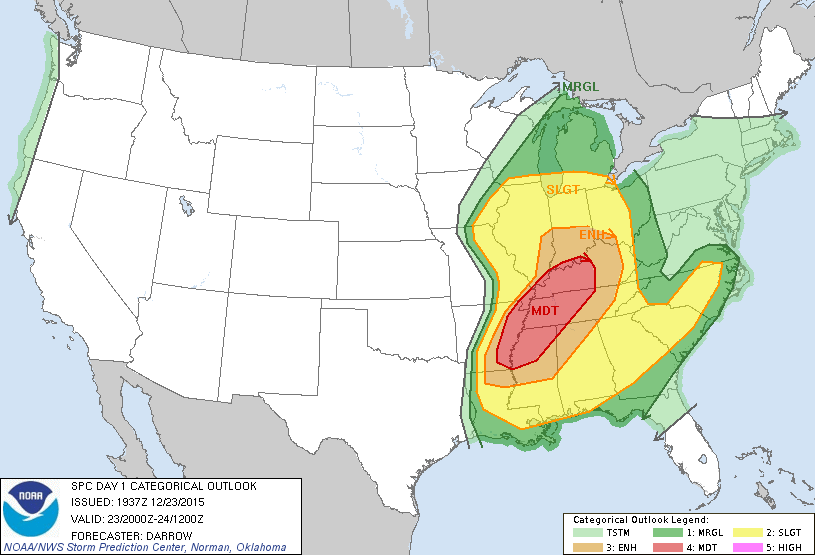

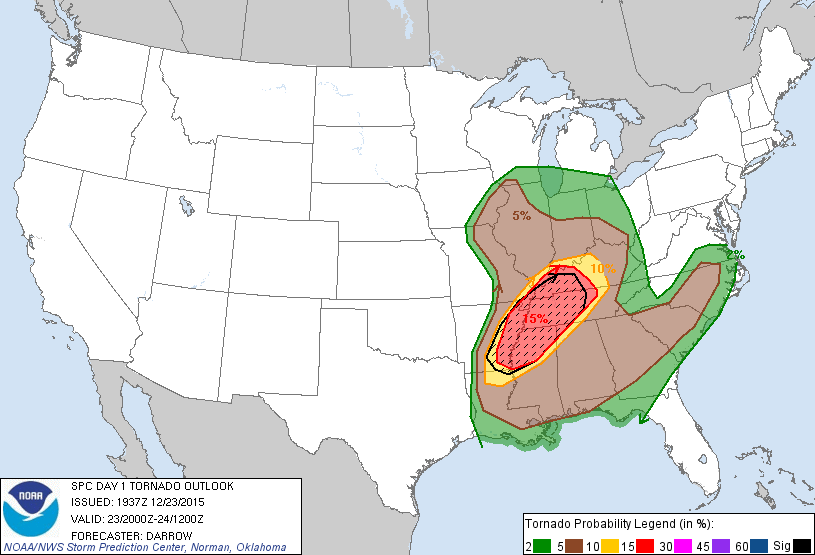
December 23, 2000Z Convective Outlook (above), and respective tornado probability contour (below)

On December 23, the Storm Prediction Center discussed the probabilities for severe weather to materialize in the Mississippi Valley, encompassing regions in northern Louisiana, eastern Arkansas, northwestern Mississippi, western Tennessee, the Missouri Bootheel, and extreme southwestern Kentucky. A cold front ejecting from the Texas Panhandle and a warm front coming from the lower Ohio River valley, intersected by a stationary front placed over western Kansas, led to the creation of a triple point over northwestern Missouri. This set up the environment for an atmosphere conducive to severe weather. As the evening progressed, further certainty arose for the possibility of an outbreak, as Convective Available Potential Energy values of around 1,000–2,000 J/kg and effective wind shear were present for the aforementioned areas of the upper Mississippi Valley. Daylight heating in these areas gave way to effective buoyancy in the area, further improving the conditions for supercells to develop. Given the favorable parameters, the SPC, alongside its Convective Outlook, introduced a 15% hatched area for tornadoes, indicating the probability for a few strong tornadoes to occur, as discrete supercell thunderstorms were expected to develop in the area. As such, the SPC issued a PDS tornado watch, the first of multiple tornado watches that day, for northern Louisiana, western Arkansas, northwestern Mississippi, and western Tennessee, highlighting the elevated threat for strong tornadoes in the area. At 2000 UTC, the SPC introduced an increased area for the concern of strong tornadoes, extending the existent area to reach central Tennessee, northwestern Alabama, and central portions of Kentucky.

== Tornado summary ==
=== Tate and Marshall Counties ===
The tornado touched down north of Tyro near Pearl Smith Road in Tate County, inflicting minor roof damage before the tornado entered Marshall County. The tornado did $5,000 in damages in Tate County with no casualties.

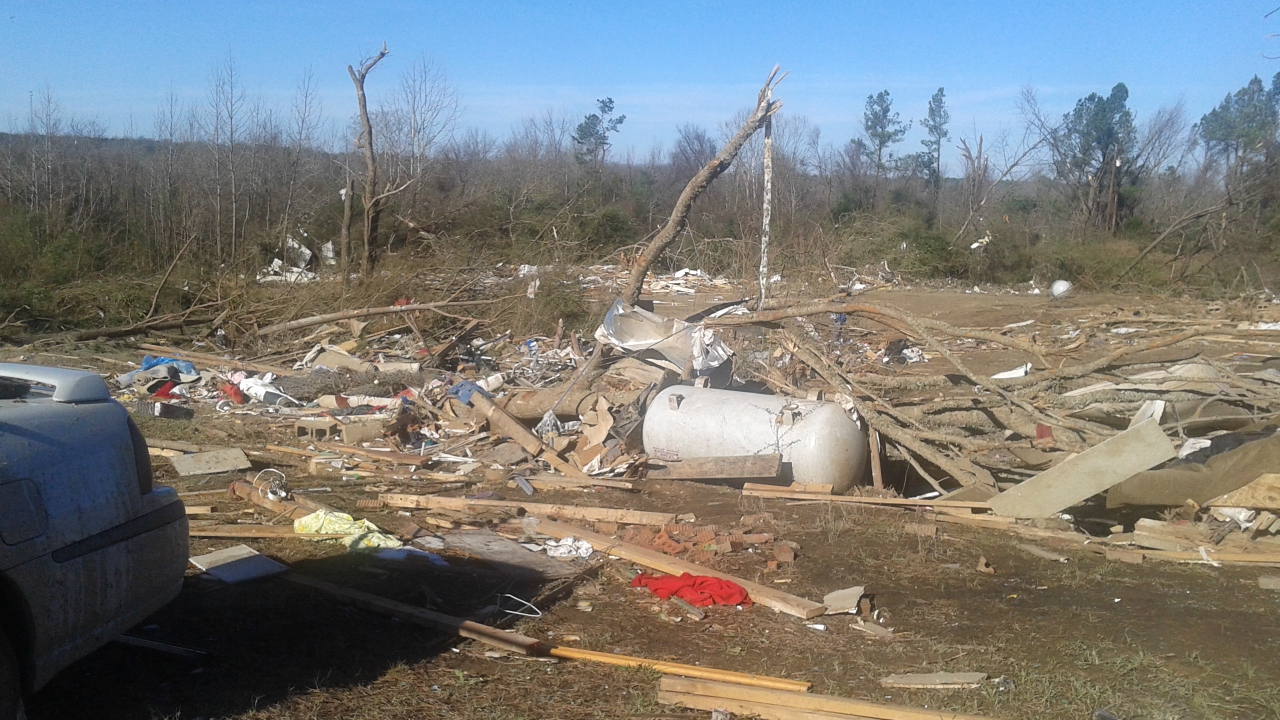
A poorly constructed home near Chulahoma completely leveled at low-end EF3 intensity

The tornado intensified along Tyro Road south of Chulahoma, destroying a single-wide trailer home at mid-range EF2 intensity. Five people in the home were injured, including a 12-year-old child who was blown away 300 ft (91 m). A poorly constructed block home was leveled at low-end EF3 strength, with estimated wind speeds of 145 mph (233 km/h); another single-wide manufactured home was obliterated at 127 mph (204 km/h); and a separate framed home experienced losses to its exterior walls. Several homes along Tyro Road were heavily damaged or destroyed. The tornado crossed Highway 4 west of Chulahoma, inflicting severe damage to the Mount Gillie Community Church at high-end EF2 strength. A home nearby sustained minor damage. The tornado traversed through rural areas of Marshall County north of Galena. The tornado crossed Yarbrough Chapel Road, strengthening to high-end EF2 intensity, collapsing the exterior walls of a home at 132 mph (212 km/h). The tornado crossed Old Highway 4, rapidly intensifying to high-end EF3 strength with maximum estimated wind speeds of 160 mph (260 km/h), leveling the Beverly Chapel CME Church, downing surrounding trees, and inflicting major damage to a poorly built home, leaving a few interior walls standing. At 4:17 p.m. CST, the National Weather Service office in Memphis, Tennessee issued a tornado emergency for Holly Springs and surrounding counties.

...TORNADO EMERGENCY FOR HOLLY SPRINGS...

...A TORNADO WARNING REMAINS IN EFFECT UNTIL 445 PM CST FOR NORTHWESTERN LAFAYETTE...MARSHALL...SOUTHEASTERN TATE AND NORTHEASTERN PANOLA COUNTIES...

AT 416 PM CST...A CONFIRMED LARGE AND DESTRUCTIVE TORNADO WAS LOCATED NEAR MARIANNA...OR 8 MILES WEST OF WALL DOXEY STATE PARK...MOVING NORTHEAST AT 55 MPH.

TORNADO EMERGENCY FOR HOLLY SPRINGS. TAKE COVER NOW. THIS IS A

PARTICULARLY DANGEROUS SITUATION.

The tornado tore through the southeastern edge of Holly Springs, leveling multiple homes and flipping many vehicles at EF2-EF3 intensity, killing a 7-year-old boy along Highway 7 and injuring several others, an 80-year-old elderly woman was also killed when her mobile home was heavily damaged. Holly Springs Motorsports suffered major destruction, the track managers' home was destroyed, sections of grandstands and a trailer were wrapped around a tree and an RV was flipped onto one of the track's bathrooms. The tornado inflicted in $6 million in damage and two fatalities in Marshall County, alongside 30 injuries.

=== Benton and Tippah Counties ===
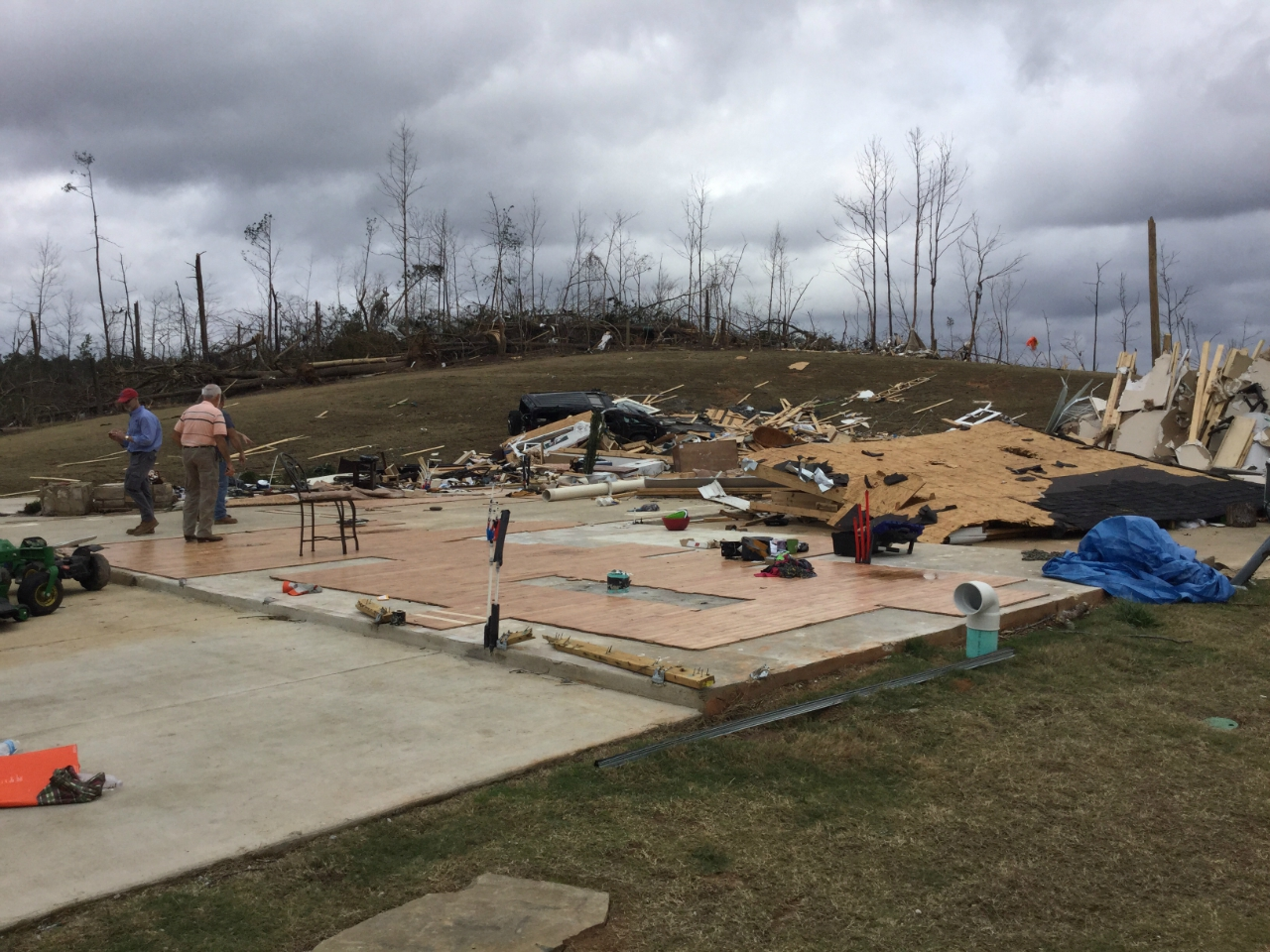
Low-end EF4 damage to a large house near Hamilton, Mississippi.

The tornado entered Benton County, traversing northeast of Ashland. The tornado rapidly intensified to high-end EF3 strength with wind speeds up to 165 mph (266 km/h). A home along Lamar Road was leveled, injuring one person inside. Multiple trees were snapped and uprooted; another home along the road was largely unroofed, and a car was left mangled. The tornado sustained intensity, destroying and sweeping a wooden framed home crossing Country Church Road, killing two people in this location and leaving one missing and another injured. Three days after the tornado, the body of the missing person was found. The tornado crossed Highway 5, weakening to low-end EF2 intensity. A metal building sustained significant damage, and a metal roof for a church was ripped off. The tornado crossed Hunt Road north of the rural community of Black Jack, mostly unroofing a one-story home, and another home along the road sustained major damage to their exterior walls. The tornado reached its peak intensity near the small community of Hamilton. A large, well-built home was swept away at low-end EF4 intensity, with estimated wind speeds up to 170 mph (270 km/h), and multiple softwood trees nearby were shredded and debarked. The tornado exited Benton County, resulting in six fatalities and one injury and a $1.96 million loss. The tornado weakened to EF3 intensity entering Tippah County, damaging multiple homes and mobile homes, killing a 61-year-old woman. Near the Mississippi and Tennessee border, a metal building collapsed along Highway 15.

=== Hardeman and McNairy Counties ===
The tornado crossed into Tennessee, weakening down to EF3 intensity. The tornado destroyed a large metal agricultural building. The tornado passed south of Middleton, damaging a convenience store and mobile home. Multiple homes and businesses were damaged in Hardeman County before moving into McNairy County. The tornado weakened further as it passed south of Selmer, damaging or destroying numerous structures, including one that sustained low-end EF3 damage to its exterior and interior walls. The final damage noted was to an automobile service along Highway 45, which suffered minor damage to its roof before the tornado dissipated.

== Aftermath ==
The tornado seen on a CCTV camera in Holly Springs

The tornado damaged or destroyed 200 homes in Marshall County, 145 homes in Tippah County, 77 homes and mobile homes in Benton County, 12-15 homes in McNairy county. Samaritan's Purse sent experts to assess the tornado impacted areas. The disaster relief unit set up base at Ashland Baptist Church in Ashland, Mississippi, carrying heavy-duty tarps, chainsaws, and generators, promising to clear debris and cover damaged roofs. Operation BBQ relief went to Holly Springs to distribute meals to affected residents and first responders. 150-200 volunteers went out to put tarps on roofs and checks on farmstock. Other groups helped distribute donated goods and meals to residents and volunteers.

== See also ==
- 2015 Garland tornado – Another large and violent tornado that occurred three days later in Texas.
- List of F4 and EF4 tornadoes (2010–2019)
- Weather of 2015
