= Mariópolis =

Coordinates: 26°20′S 52°33′W

- Municipality
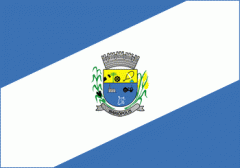
- Flag
- Interactive map of Mariópolis
- Country: Brazil
- Region: Southern
- State: Paraná
- Mesoregion: Sudoeste Paranaense

Population (2020)
  - Total: 6,632
- Time zone: UTC−3 (BRT)

Mariópolis is a municipality in the state of Paraná in the Southern Region of Brazil.

== See also ==
- List of municipalities in Paraná
