= Lodi =

Lodi may refer to:

== Medieval kingdoms ==
- Lodi dynasty, a Pashtun dynasty ruling India from 1451 to 1526
- Lodi dynasty of Multan, ruling house of an emirate in the Punjab

== Tribes ==
- Lodi (Pashtun tribe), a Pashtun tribe mainly found in Afghanistan and Pakistan

== Places ==
=== Canada ===
- Lodi, Ontario, a community in North Stormont, Ontario, Canada

=== India ===
- Lodi Fort, a fort/citadel in Ludhiana, Punjab, India

=== Italy ===
- Lodi, Lombardy, in the Province of Lodi of the Lombardy region
  - Treaty of Lodi, 1454 between Italian city-states
  - Battle of Lodi, 1796 in Lodi
- Province of Lodi, a province in the Lombardy region of Italy
- Lodi Vecchio, a commune of the Lombardy region

=== United States ===
- Lodi, Arkansas
- Lodi, California
  - Lodi AVA, a California wine region
  - Lodi Academy, a school in Lodi, California
- Lodi, Illinois (disambiguation), various places
- Lodi, Indiana
- Lodi, Michigan (disambiguation), various places
- Lodi, Mississippi (disambiguation), various places
- Lodi, Missouri
- Lodi, Nebraska
- Lodi, Nevada
- Lodi, New Jersey
- Lodi (village), New York, a village in Seneca County
- Lodi, New York, a town in Seneca County
- Lodi, Oklahoma
- Lodi, Ohio
- Lodi, Pennsylvania
- Lodi, Texas
- Lodi, Virginia
- Lodi, Wisconsin, a city
- Lodi (town), Wisconsin
- Lodi Township, Athens County, Ohio
- Lodi Township, Michigan
- Lodi Township, Minnesota
- Lodi Township, New Jersey, a township that existed in Bergen County, New Jersey, United States, from 1826 to 1935

== Music ==
- "Lodi" (Creedence Clearwater Revival song), a track from the 1969 album Green River
- "Lodi", a song from the Bollywood film Veer-Zaara, directed by Yash Chopra

== Other uses ==
- Lodi (apple), a variety of apple
- Lodi (ship), a type of Estonian barge or sailing ship; See Emajõgi
- Lodi (wrestler) (born 1970), in-ring name of professional wrestler Brad Cain
- Lodi station (disambiguation), stations of the name
- Lodi Gardens, a park in New Delhi, India
- Lodi Road, a street in New Delhi, India
- Francesco Lodi (born 1984), Italian association football player
- Renan Lodi (born 1998), Brazilian association football player
- Lohri or Lodi, an annual festival in Northern India
- Lodi, part of the soul that lives in the forest, rather than in a son or totem, in Mbuti mythology

== See also ==
- Lodhi (disambiguation)
- Lori (disambiguation)
- Lodi High School (disambiguation)
