= December 2015 North American storm complex =

2015 massive storm system that affected North America

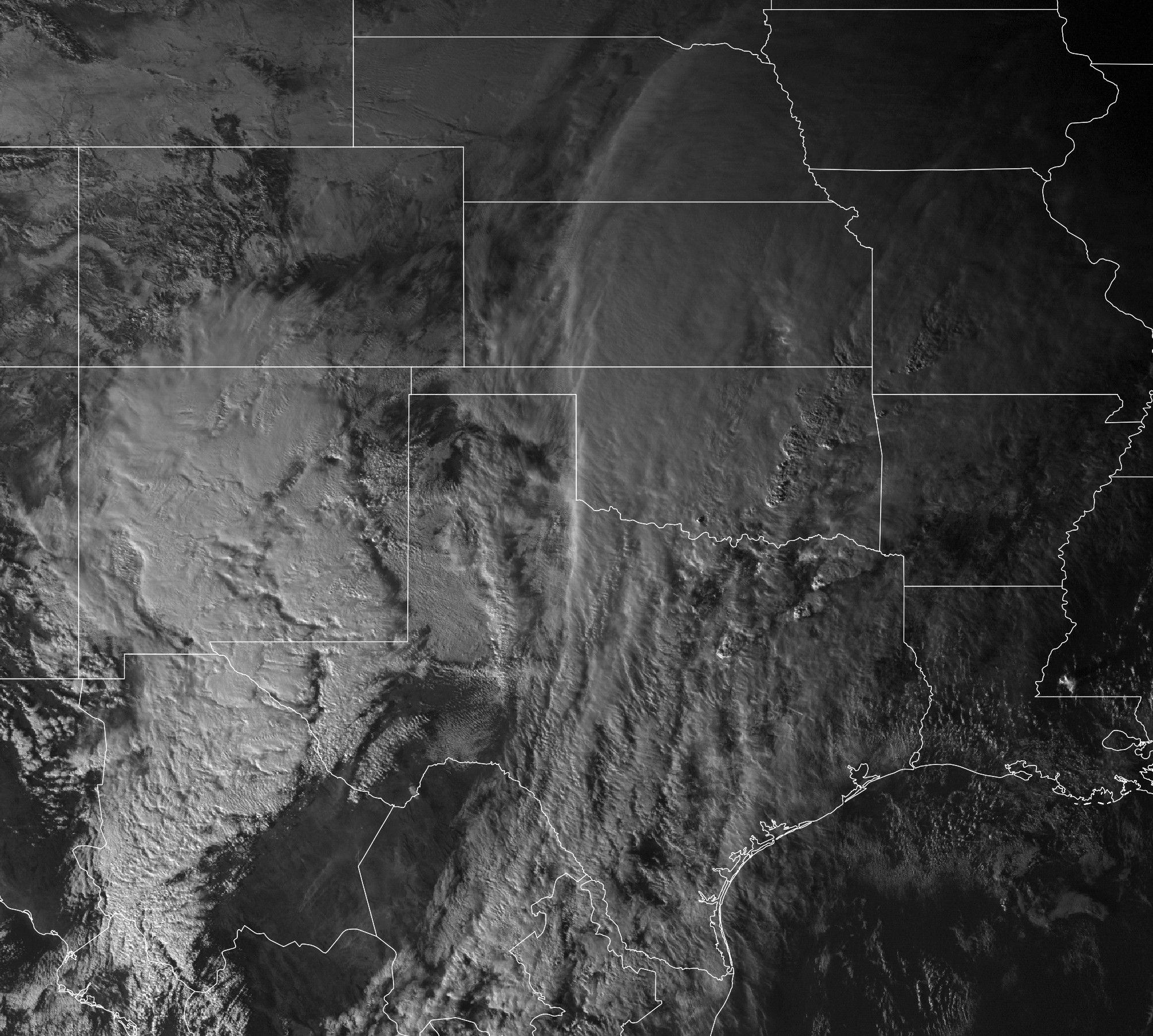
- GOES-13 satellite image of the storm complex over the Southern United States on December 26

Meteorological history
- Formed: December 25, 2015
- Dissipated: December 30, 2015

Blizzard
- Lowest pressure: 989 hPa (mbar); 29.21 inHg
- Max. snowfall: 41 in (1.0 m) at Bonito Lake, New Mexico

Tornado outbreak
- Tornadoes: 32 confirmed
- Max. rating: EF4 tornado
- Duration: 2 days, 2 hours, 4 minutes
- Highest winds: 180 mph (290 km/h) (Garland, Texas EF4 tornado on December 26)

Overall effects
- Fatalities: 59 fatalities
- Damage: ≥ $3 billion
- Areas affected: Southwestern, Central, and New England regions in the United States (particularly Texas); Northern Mexico; Southeastern Canada
- Power outages: > 65,000
- Part of the 2015–16 North American winter and tornado outbreaks of 2015

The December 2015 North American storm complex, also known as Winter Storm Goliath, was a major storm complex that produced a tornado outbreak, a winter storm, a blizzard and an ice storm in areas ranging from the Southwestern United States to New England. Tornadoes struck the Dallas–Fort Worth metroplex in Texas, including a deadly EF4 tornado that struck Garland and Rowlett, while several other states, especially Missouri, were affected by heavy rain and snow causing severe floods. As the system moved through the Great Lakes, heavy rain, ice pellets and heavy snow fell in the entire region. Wintry mix moved through southern Ontario and Quebec had significant snowfall on December 29. Almost 60 people were killed during the storm system's progression and aftermath, making it one of the deadliest such systems of 2015 in the United States.

== Meteorological history ==
The outbreak was caused by a vigorous upper-level trough that moved into the Central and Southern Plains states on December 25. An extratropical cyclone developed ahead of this upper-level trough over the West Coast, which moved southeast into the Southwestern United States early on December 26. Continuing to move east, snow began to fall in the Upper Midwest, dropping up to 5–8 inches (13–20 cm), before rapidly dissipating. As the initial low-pressure area moved over the United States–Mexico border, a southwards dip in the jet stream to the west had formed. In response to this, an upper-level low developed by evening on December 26. This upper-level low began to track to the north, drawing moisture from the Pacific Ocean and Gulf of Mexico. As it did so, a long cluster of heavy showers and thunderstorms fired up from eastern Oklahoma to southwestern Missouri, which set up a severe flooding event. Some areas picked up to over 1 inch (25 mm) of rainfall, triggering several floods.

At the same time, discrete tornadic supercells developed in Texas. One of the cells produced a violent EF4 wedge tornado, which ripped through parts of Garland and Rowlett, Texas, causing major damage and killing 10 people. As the storm complex began to move to the north, more supercells formed, and several more tornadoes were reported. By the early morning of December 27, the supercells had merged into a squall line, which produced a few more isolated tornadoes.

While generating severe weather in the Deep South, the storm complex brought heavy snow and blizzard conditions in the southwestern parts of Texas through December 26–27, as frigid temperatures had spilled south into the area just the previous day before. Strong winds contributed to power outages and blowing and drifting snow. Snowfall continued throughout December 27 before tapering off near midnight as the storm system began to pull out of the region. In total, the storm complex dumped up to two feet (60 cm) of snow in the western parts of Texas, a very rare and historic occurrence in the affected areas. The storm had also produced a small but significant ice storm in the central parts of Texas, with ice accumulations ranging up to one inch (25 mm) in some areas, leading to thousands of power outages.

By December 28, the storm complex had moved into the Central United States, producing more snow, ice, heavy rain, and severe weather in an area stretching from the Midwest into Louisiana. The upper-level low eventually began to take over as the dominant low, and had begun to make a more east-northeastwards turn. Spreading a swath of 6–12 inches (15–30 cm) from Missouri to Maine, the storm complex continued to accelerate into southern Canada while producing more ice, rain and severe weather as the southern quadrant approached the East Coast. Rain eventually reached areas like Philadelphia and New York City late on December 28, and persisted somewhat into the early morning hours of December 29. At this point, the storm system had already entered Canada, and its circulation was beginning to become elongated. The remnants of the storm eventually dissipated, early on December 30.

== Confirmed tornadoes ==
Confirmed tornadoes by Enhanced Fujita rating
EFU	EF0	EF1	EF2	EF3	EF4	EF5	Total
0	10	17	3	1	1	0	32

=== December 26 event ===
List of confirmed tornadoes – Saturday, December 26, 2015 (Note: All dates are based on the local time zone where the tornado touched down; however, all times are in Coordinated Universal Time for consistency.)
EF#	Location	County / Parish	State	Start Coord.	Time (UTC)	Path length	Max width	Damage (2015 USD)
EF0	NE of Byars	McClain	OK	34.94°N 96.96°W	1957	0.1 mi (0.16 km)	20 yd (18 m)	Unknown
EF0	A storm chaser reported a brief tornado.							
EF0	N of Hubbard	Hill	TX	31.89°N 96.81°W	2003–2007	2.76 mi (4.44 km)	50 yd (46 m)	$15,000
EF0	A local fire department reported a tornado that damaged crops.							
EF0	NE of Eustace	Henderson	TX	32.33°N 95.99°W	2044–2046	0.9 mi (1.4 km)	40 yd (37 m)	$10,000
EF0	Trained storm spotters observed a tornado that damaged crops over open land.							
EF0	NNE of Emory	Rains	TX	32.9°N 95.73°W	2126–2127	0.69 mi (1.11 km)	75 yd (69 m)	$0
EF0	Trained storm spotters reported a brief tornado.							
EF0	NNW of Hillsboro	Hill	TX	32.039°N 97.157°W	2310–2312	1.6 mi (2.6 km)	80 yd (73 m)	$20,000
EF0	Trained storm spotters reported a brief tornado. It remained over open country and caused no damage.							
EF0	S of Sulphur Springs	Hopkins	TX	33.023°N 95.63°W	2333–2334	0.36 mi (0.58 km)	25 yd (23 m)	$0
EF0	A storm chaser observed a brief tornado.							
EF0	NE of Maypearl	Ellis	TX	32.334°N 97.012°W	2343–2344	1.58 mi (2.54 km)	50 yd (46 m)	$0
EF0	A local fire department reported a brief tornado.							
EF3	E of Midlothian to Glenn Heights	Ellis, Dallas	TX	32.4623°N 96.909°W	0001–0013	8.52 mi (13.71 km)	125 yd (114 m)	$9,730,000
EF3	See Section on this tornado – 46 people were injured.							
EF4	Sunnyvale to Garland to Rowlett	Dallas, Rockwall	TX	32.796°N 96.5894°W	0046–0102	13.04 mi (20.99 km)	550 yd (500 m)	$26,800,000
EF4	10 deaths – See article on this tornado – This was the second tornado produced by the Garland supercell. 468 people were injured.							
EF0	NE of Ennis	Ellis	TX	32.3855°N 96.53°W	0100–0102	5.08 mi (8.18 km)	150 yd (140 m)	$40,000
EF0	A few barns were damaged.							
EF2	N of Lavon to N of Copeville	Collin	TX	33.0607°N 96.434°W	0109–0115	5.29 mi (8.51 km)	300 yd (270 m)	$1,400,000
EF2	2 deaths – See section on this tornado – This was the last intense tornado produced by the Garland supercell. 119 people were injured.							
EF1	W of Farmersville	Collin	TX	33.1587°N 96.3956°W	0117–0123	4.47 mi (7.19 km)	300 yd (270 m)	$1,500,000
EF1	Several homes, including six mobile homes, were damaged or destroyed. This was the fourth tornado produced by the Garland supercell.							
EF1	SE of Blue Ridge	Collin	TX	33.2718°N 96.3546°W	0133–0138	5.21 mi (8.38 km)	100 yd (91 m)	$600,000
EF1	1 death – A log-construction frame home was damaged, and a metal high-tension truss tower was blown over. Multiple mobile homes sustained major damage, with a two-day old infant being killed in one of them. Fence posts were pulled out of the ground and trees were downed as well. Two people were injured. This was the fifth and final tornado produced by the Garland supercell.							

=== December 27 event ===
List of confirmed tornadoes – Sunday, December 27, 2015
EF#	Location	County / Parish	State	Start Coord.	Time (UTC)	Path length	Max width	Damage (2015 USD)
EF0	WSW of De Kalb	Bowie	TX	33.4971°N 94.6687°W	2106–2110	2.93 mi (4.72 km)	75 yd (69 m)	$15,000
EF0	The roof of a mobile home was partially removed, and several trees were snapped.							
EF1	NW of Gilmer	Upshur	TX	32.732°N 94.9854°W	2124–2127	7.98 mi (12.84 km)	1,338 yd (1,223 m)	$45,000
EF1	A few outbuildings lost metal roofing panels, and several trees were downed, with a couple causing damage to two houses.							
EF1	NW of Hampton to ENE of Bearden	Calhoun, Ouachita	AR	33.6422°N 92.6514°W	2132–2146	7.1 mi (11.4 km)	100 yd (91 m)	$150,000
EF1	Part of the roof was blown off of a couple industrial buildings at Highland Industrial Park, several empty rail cars were blown over, and in Bearden, roofing material was ripped off several commercial buildings. A small gas station was also damaged. Several trees were downed along the path.							
EF1	E of Patmos	Hempstead	AR	33.5127°N 93.5267°W	2136–2137	0.84 mi (1.35 km)	350 yd (320 m)	$15,000
EF1	Pine trees were downed and a mobile home was damaged.							
EF1	ESE of Camden	Calhoun	AR	33.4345°N 92.5534°W	2156–2207	7.22 mi (11.62 km)	400 yd (370 m)	$55,000
EF1	An intermittent tornado destroyed two sheds, damaged the roof on a home, and downed several pine trees on a path that passed near Hampton. One pine tree fell on and crushed two cars.							
EF1	E of Willisville	Nevada	AR	33.4751°N 93.2818°W	2236–2244	3.85 mi (6.20 km)	353 yd (323 m)	$100,000
EF1	Several outbuildings were destroyed and a house sustained roof damage. Numerous trees were snapped and uprooted along the path.							
EF2	NNE of Marshall to SSE of Jefferson	Harrison	TX	32.6228°N 94.3216°W	2239–2251	7.78 mi (12.52 km)	300 yd (270 m)	$300,000
EF2	Two mobile homes and several outbuildings were destroyed, with pieces of tin roofing from one outbuilding being found at least a quarter-mile away. Multiple frame homes were damaged as well, and a pickup truck and storage trailer were tossed. Numerous trees were snapped and uprooted along the path.							
EF1	Hermitage to E of Banks	Bradley	AR	33.4495°N 92.1725°W	2306–2318	7.11 mi (11.44 km)	200 yd (180 m)	$75,000
EF1	An awning was damaged at Hermitage School, part of the roof was ripped off a chicken house, a shed was destroyed, and a home sustained minor damage. Many trees were downed.							
EF1	ENE of Lodi	Cass	TX	32.9046°N 94.2196°W	2309–2311	1.25 mi (2.01 km)	200 yd (180 m)	$0
EF1	Several trees were snapped or uprooted.							
EF1	W of Wilmar	Drew	AR	33.5843°N 91.9564°W	0006–0017	5.74 mi (9.24 km)	150 yd (140 m)	$60,000
EF1	The roof was ripped off of a house and thrown onto a shed, and several pine trees were downed.							
EF1	W of Blanchard	Caddo	LA	32.5989°N 94.0249°W	0210–0211	0.09 mi (0.14 km)	41 yd (37 m)	$5,000
EF1	Trees were snapped and uprooted along the path, and a mobile home sustained damage to its skirting.							
EF1	NNE of Blanchard	Caddo	LA	32.6071°N 93.8777°W	0216–0220	2.27 mi (3.65 km)	144 yd (132 m)	$250,000
EF1	Tornado moved through two mobile home parks, damaging numerous mobile homes. One of the mobile homes was blown off its foundation, while another was crushed by a tree. One outbuilding was destroyed and two others were damaged. Numerous trees were snapped and uprooted along the path.							
EF1	SW of Homer	Claiborne	LA	32.7639°N 93.1255°W	0510–0511	0.17 mi (0.27 km)	21 yd (19 m)	$0
EF1	Several trees were uprooted.							

=== December 28 event ===
List of confirmed tornadoes – Monday, December 28, 2015
EF#	Location	County / Parish	State	Start Coord.	Time (UTC)	Path length	Max width	Damage (2015 USD)
EF1	ENE of Walker	Livingston	LA	30.4995°N 90.8292°W	0853–0856	1.94 mi (3.12 km)	100 yd (91 m)	Unknown
EF1	A semi-truck was flipped and a trailer was moved. A building has its metal roof ripped off and a door blown inward.							
EF1	W of Laplace	St. John the Baptist	LA	30.0775°N 90.5378°W	0920–0925	0.6 mi (0.97 km)	150 yd (140 m)	Unknown
EF1	Roof and fence damage occurred, and several power poles were snapped.							
EF2	SW of Marianna	Lee	AR	34.702°N 90.9161°W	1046–1051	5.75 mi (9.25 km)	40 yd (37 m)	$50,000
EF2	A mobile home was destroyed and homes sustained roof damage.							
EF1	NW of Seminary	Covington	MS	31.5405°N 89.5301°W	1143–1151	5.59 mi (9.00 km)	100 yd (91 m)	$100,000
EF1	One barn was destroyed, several homes sustained minor damage, and numerous trees were snapped or uprooted.							
EF1	SW of Chumuckla	Santa Rosa	FL	30.7626°N 87.2375°W	1430–1432	0.78 mi (1.26 km)	75 yd (69 m)	$10,000
EF1	A tornado tracked through a heavily forested area, uprooting pecan trees and snapping cedar and pines. The NWS survey team was unable to examine the entire path, and it is possible the tornado path extended further south.							
EF0	NNE of Trinity	Union	NC	34.877°N 80.526°W	2158–2201	0.9 mi (1.4 km)	75 yd (69 m)	$50,000
EF0	Five sheds and outbuildings were damaged or destroyed, the wall of one home sitting on concrete blocks was slightly shifted, a camper was rolled onto its side, and trees were downed.							

=== Midlothian–Ovilla–Glenn Heights, Texas ===
Midlothian–Ovilla–Glenn Heights, Texas
- The tornado seen illuminated by a power flash

Meteorological history
- Formed: December 26, 2015, 6:00 pm CST (UTC–06:00)
- Dissipated: December 26, 2015, 6:13 pm CST (UTC–06:00)
- Duration: 13 minutes

EF3 tornado
- on the Enhanced Fujita scale
- Highest winds: 160 mph (260 km/h)

Overall effects
- Fatalities: 0
- Injuries: 46
- Damage: $9.73 million (2015 USD)

This strong and destructive tornado touched down on Palmer Road, moving into Daniel Road and Spring Branch Road at EF0 to EF1 intensity, dealing minor roof damage to multiple homes and rolling a mobile home. The tornado continued to move northeast, dealing minor damage to more homes before rapidly intensifying to EF3 strength as the tornado caused severe damage to multiple homes, some of which had all of their walls collapsed along Walker Court and Faith Lane.

The tornado then quickly weakened to EF1 strength as it crossed Clayton Drive, Loyalty Drive and Faithful Drive before again intensifying to EF2 strength on Meghan Drive, Glenloch Drive, Etta Court and Rex Court as homes had their exterior walls collapsed, roof structures partially or completely removed, with debris being thrown into nearby yards and fields. The tornado then reached EF3 intensity a second time on Billingsley Drive as a large, well-built home was completely destroyed with only interior walls remaining.

The tornado then weakened back to EF1 intensity, briefly reaching EF2 intensity as it ripped roofs and collapsed the walls of one home along the Willow Brook River. The tornado continued to parallel South Hampton Road before impacting Donald T Shields Elementary and the Ovilla Road Church of the Nazarene at EF1 intensity, destroying the school's wall cladding and destroying the roof and wall cladding of the church. The tornado then tracked across South Hampton Road, damaged the wall cladding and roof of the Harvest of Praise Ministry Church at EF1, and rapidly intensified as it crossed Trisha Lane at EF3 intensity, completely collapsing all of the walls of two homes, except for small interior rooms. The tornado then tracked mainly across fields, crossing East Bear Creek Road where two mobile homes were separated and rolled at EF1 intensity before reaching EF2 intensity as it destroyed the roofs of three homes along Mockingbird Lane and Cascade Drive. The tornado dealt no further damage as it tracked through a field before lifting near East Parkerville Road.

The tornado, which was the first EF3 to hit Ellis County in December, tracked for 8.5 miles with a max width of 125 yards, injuring 46 people and affecting 77 single-family homes, 23 of which were completely destroyed. The National Weather Service noted the tornado as a possible EF4.

=== Sunnyvale–Garland–Rowlett, Texas ===
Sunnyvale–Garland–Rowlett, Texas
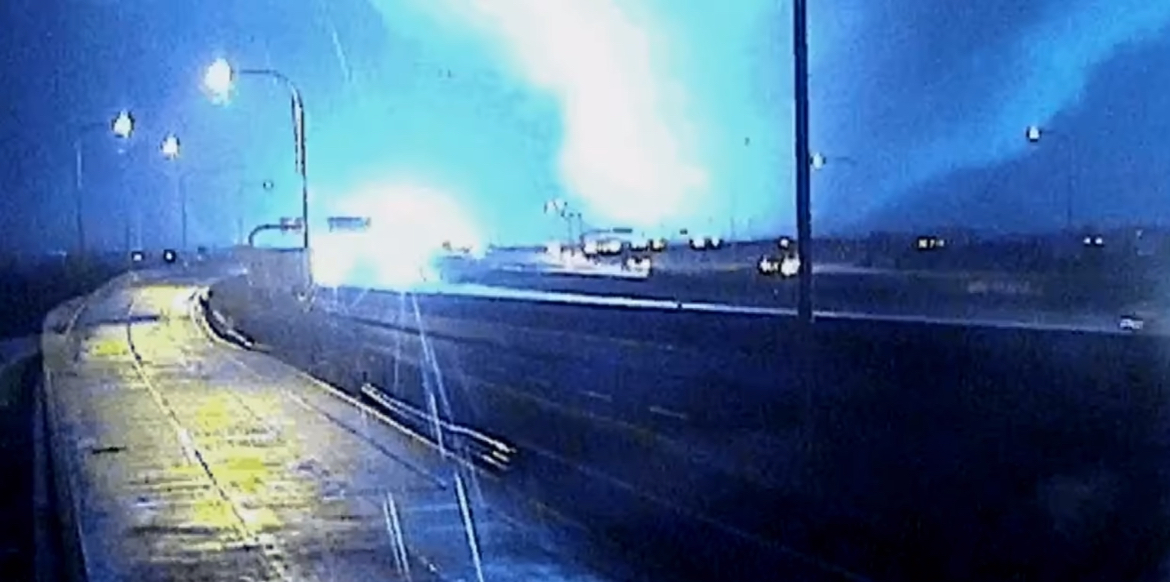
- A power flash seen to the left of the tornado seen in this photo.

Meteorological history
- Formed: December 26, 2015, 6:46 pm CST (UTC–06:00)
- Dissipated: December 26, 2015, 7:02 pm CST (UTC–06:00)
- Duration: 16 minutes

EF4 tornado
- on the Enhanced Fujita scale
- Highest winds: 180 mph (290 km/h)

Overall effects
- Fatalities: 10
- Injuries: 468
- Damage: $26.8 million (2015 USD)

This violent and deadly wedge tornado touched down on E Tripp Road at EF0 intensity, causing minor damage to homes. The tornado would continue across Mansfield Boulevard, Hearthstone Drive, and Grindstone Street, quickly intensifying to EF2 strength as it destroyed the roof of a 2-story home on Old Mill Road, continuing to produce EF2 damage as it destroyed another home's roof on Shady Cove Drive.

The tornado continued across rural areas, impacting no structures. The tornado reached EF3 intensity for the first time on Christina Lane, as a large home was completely collapsed with nearby homes having their roofs destroyed. The tornado then weakened back to EF2 strength as it crossed Macgregor Drive, Beaus Way, and Lakeway Drive, collapsing the exterior walls of homes, including one which only had small interior rooms remaining.

The tornado would then rapidly intensify to EF4 strength as a well-built home was completely collapsed. The tornado would cross Freeport Drive at EF3 intensity, damaging homes and completely destroying an outbuilding, before crossing Oceanport Drive, where multiple homes were completely collapsed except for small interior rooms, one of which was impacted by a semi-truck that was thrown by the tornado. The tornado then crossed Locust Grove Road at EF4 intensity, destroying multiple apartments and a doctor's office. The tornado then crossed George Bush Turnpike and I-30 at EF3 intensity, killing 9 as their cars were thrown long distances off of the highway. The tornado then quickly weakened to EF1 strength as it snapped the trunks of multiple trees along George Bush Turnpike.

The tornado then crossed Lake Ray Hubbard, landing in Rowlett, Texas. The tornado would re-intensify to EF2 strength, destroying the roofs of multiple homes on Windjammer Way, briefly reaching EF3 intensity on La Costa Drive as a home had all of its walls collapsed. The tornado continued to produce EF2 damage to homes as it struck Lagoon Drive and Harbor Drive, briefly reaching EF3 intensity again as it collapsed the walls of a home there, Calypso Drive and Cousteau Drive, briefly strengthening to EF3 intensity again as it destroyed all of the walls of a home except small interior rooms on Mariner Drive, Highgate Lane, briefly reaching EF3 intensity as a home had all of its walls collapsed on Lake Bend Drive, and Woodside Drive. The tornado would then rapidly begin to weaken and cross over Lake Ray Hubbard, dissipating there.

The tornado affected nearly 600 homes in Dallas County, particularly in the cities of Sunnyvale, Garland, and Rowlett. Of these, nearly 400 were destroyed, including a few well-constructed homes that were completely leveled. An additional 22 businesses were impacted, of which one was completely destroyed. Several mobile homes were also destroyed. 468 people were injured.

=== Copeville, Texas ===
Copeville, Texas
- The tornado seen in Copeville, Texas.

Meteorological history
- Formed: December 26, 2015, 7:09 pm CST (UTC–06:00)
- Dissipated: December 26, 2015, 7:15 pm CST (UTC–06:00)
- Duration: 6 minutes

EF2 tornado
- on the Enhanced Fujita scale
- Highest winds: 120 mph (190 km/h)

Overall effects
- Fatalities: 2
- Injuries: 119
- Damage: $1.4 million (2015 USD)

This intense and deadly tornado touched down on County Road 790 at EF0 intensity as it dealt minor damage to homes. Continuing parallel to the Canadian Pacific Railway, the tornado would then begin to reach EF1 intensity as it damaged multiple homes before intensifying to EF2 strength as a home had its roof destroyed on Country Road 489. The tornado continued along State Highway 78, dealing no damage as it crossed through a field before reaching peak EF2 intensity near downtown Copeville, damaging a tire shop and destroying 30 businesses including a fireworks stand, daycare center, and a feed store. Two people were killed as a gas station was completely destroyed.

The tornado then continued traveling directly across State Highway 78, hitting no structures before again reaching EF2 intensity as homes had their roofs and some exterior walls destroyed further north near Bethesda Ranch, which was then hit at EF0 intensity as multiple homes suffered minor damage, mostly to roofs. The tornado continued to track north on State Highway 78, damaging the roofs of multiple homes at EF1 to EF0 intensity, inflicting its final damage to a group of homes on Country Road 558 before lifting 240 meters to the north.

The tornado, which was the first EF2 to hit Collin County in December, tracked for 5.3 miles with a max width of 300 yards, injuring 119 people, killing 2, and causing over $1.4 million dollars in property damage. 2 years after the tornado many businesses had still not been rebuilt, causing additional economic damage to the town. This was the last intense tornado produced by the Garland supercell.

== Preparations and impact ==
=== Tornado outbreak ===
==== Texas ====
On December 26, 2015, the tornado outbreak portion of the storm system, with 32 tornadoes total confirmed, began when 12 tornadoes impacted Texas that evening, mostly in and around the Dallas–Fort Worth metroplex, killing 13 people, which made it the deadliest tornado disaster in the area since the Dallas tornado of 1957, and added to the highest tornado death count in the U.S. for the month of December since 1953. An EF3 tornado moved through multiple subdivisions in Ovilla and Glenn Heights, Texas on the south side of the metroplex, destroying numerous homes and two churches. Ten people in Garland, Texas died as a result of a large and powerful EF4 wedge tornado that also destroyed many homes in the neighboring suburb of Rowlett. An EF2 tornado killed two people in Copeville, while an EF1 caused another fatality near Blue Ridge. Additional tornadoes touched down across the Southern United States on December 27 and 28. Most of these tornadoes were weak, though EF2 tornadoes caused considerable damage near Marianna, Arkansas and Marshall, Texas. More than 65,000 people lost power in the area due to the tornadoes. The Dallas Mavericks had to delay their NBA game against the Chicago Bulls by one hour due to the threat of severe weather.

Damage from tornadoes in Texas alone is estimated at $1.2 billion. There were also 635 injuries. (Note: All injuries occurred from tornadoes on December 26; 46 from the EF3, 468 from the EF4, 119 from an EF2 in Collin County, and two from an EF1 in Collin County.)

=== Flooding ===
==== Southern United States ====
The storm system was responsible for heavy rain that caused severe flooding in 13 states, with Missouri being especially impacted. Parts of the state were hit with over 10 in (250 mm) of heavy rainfall. At least 14 people died due to the floods in Missouri alone. In Union, Missouri, the Bourbeuse River rose to 34.22 ft (1,043 cm), above the preceding record of 33.79 ft (1,030 cm) which occurred on December 5, 1982. More than 180 roads, including portions of Interstates 44, 55, and 70, and several bridges were closed. The Meramec River, near St. Louis, crested 2 ft (60 cm) above its previous record height, inundating nearby communities. At least 380 homes and 70 businesses were flooded in Franklin County.

Approximately 140,000 sandbags were brought in to protect portions of the Bayshore subdivision in Arnold. At least 150 homes succumbed to flooding in the city. More than 100 boat rescues were conducted in Eureka.

Major flooding also occurred in south Alabama, where the Pea River in Elba, Alabama flooded. Most of the rainfall occurred on Christmas Eve day when training thunderstorms went over the same areas. All in all, a widespread 8–16 inches (200–400 mm) occurred.

Nine levees were topped—five along the Mississippi River, three along the Missouri River, and one along the Kaskaskia River—though the affected areas were predominantly unpopulated. Large stretches of the Mississippi River were placed on alert due to projected major flooding.

Flash flooding also claimed seven lives in Illinois, two in Oklahoma, one in Arkansas, and one in Georgia.

=== Winter storm ===
==== High Plains ====
The combination of heavy snow, strong winds, and bitterly cold temperatures resulted in blizzard conditions across most of New Mexico, southeastern Colorado, western Oklahoma and West Texas. Some places in this area had over 1–3 ft (30–91 cm) of snow but also snow drifts up to 12 feet (370 cm) high. In the path of this Texas low, a swath of snow and ice impacted the central Plains and Midwest from Oklahoma to Wisconsin as the storm system moved northeastward toward the eastern Great Lakes. The storm system spread a wintry mix of snow, sleet and freezing rain to New York State and New England, disrupting travel in the region. At least 1 person in New Mexico, and 4 people in Oklahoma died as a direct result of the winter storm system. Interstate 10 in western Texas was shut down due to the storm, while Midland, Texas experienced their 3rd snowiest day on record. US 67 was also shut down in portions of Texas from Marfa to Presidio, while US 62 shut down from Carlsbad, New Mexico to the Texas state line.

==== Elsewhere and Canada ====
More than 750 flights were cancelled at Chicago O'Hare International Airport, and hundreds more at Detroit, Toronto and Montreal. Due to a strong Arctic air mass north of the system, parts of northern Michigan, Ontario and all Quebec suffered blizzard conditions, with moderate snow bands and moderate winds as well. 20–30 cm of snow (8–12 in) fell in Ottawa–Gatineau, less than 10 cm (3.9 in) in Toronto, and the greater Montreal region had 30–40 cm of snow (12–16 in).

Four people died in Minnesota in a car accident linked to snow-covered roads. Two people died from overexertion while clearing snow in Milwaukee, Wisconsin. Other similar indirect deaths from the winter storm were reported in New Mexico (1 death), Missouri (2), Michigan (1), New York (1), Vermont (3), New Hampshire (1), and Maine (1).

The dairy industry in eastern New Mexico and western Texas lost 30,000 cows to the storm.

== See also ==
- Weather of 2015
- List of North American tornadoes and tornado outbreaks
- List of F4 and EF4 tornadoes
  - List of F4 and EF4 tornadoes (2010–2019)
- Late December 2012 North American storm complex
- December 2013 North American storm complex
- November 2015 United States ice storm
- Mid-January 2017 North American ice storm
- Tornado outbreak and floods of April 28 – May 1, 2017
