= Lodhi =

Lodhi may refer to:

- Lodhi Colony, a residential colony in South Central part of New Delhi
- Lodhi (caste), a community of agriculturalists, found in India
- Lodi dynasty of Delhi Sultanate
- Lodi (Pashtun tribe), a Batani Pashtun tribe mainly found in Afghanistan and Pakistan
- Lodi Road, Delhi
- Lodha people, a tribal community of Odisha and West Bengal

== People ==
- Azhar Lodhi, newscaster and commentator at the Pakistan Television Corporation
- Faheem Khalid Lodhi, Pakistani-Australian architect
- Lodhi (rapper), Pakistani hip-hop artist and desi rapper
- Maleeha Lodhi, journalist, academic and diplomat from Pakistan
- Shaista Lodhi, a Pakistani actor, director and host

== See also ==
- Lodi (disambiguation)
- Loda (disambiguation)
- Lohri, a Punjabi festival
