= December 2015 tornado outbreak =

December 2015 tornado outbreak could refer to:

- Tornado outbreak of December 23–25, 2015
- Tornado outbreak of December 26–28, 2015, part of the December 2015 North American storm complex
