= Loda =

Loda may refer to:

- Loda, Azerbaijan
- Loda, Illinois, United States
- Loda, West Virginia, United States
- Loda Township, Iroquois County, Illinois, United States
- Loda language, North Halmahera language of Indonesia
- Battle of Lođa, 1998 Kosovo War
- Platypolia loda, cutworm

== People ==
- Loda Halama (1911–1996), Polish dancer and actress
- Loda Niemirzanka (1909–1984), Polish film actress
- Beppe Loda, dj Afro/cosmic music
- Nicola Loda (born 1971), Italian racing cyclist
- Loda, a former professional Dota 2 player and esports manager for Alliance
