= 2015 North American winter =

2015 North American winter may refer to:

- 2014–15 North American winter
- 2015–16 North American winter
