= Lodi, Michigan =

Lodi may refer to the following places in the U.S. state of Michigan:

- Lodi, Kalkaska County, Michigan, an unincorporated community in Kalkaska County
- Lodi Township, Michigan in Washtenaw County
  - Lodi, Washtenaw County, Michigan, historic settlement within the township
