= Lodi station =

Lodi station may refer to:

- Lodi railway station (Lombardy), a railway station in Lodi, Lombardy, Italy
- Lodi T.I.B.B. (Milan Metro), a metro station in Milan, Italy
- Lodi (Rome Metro), a metro station in Rome
- Lodi Transit Station, a railway station in Lodi, California, US
- Lodi station (Altamont Corridor Express), a planned railway station in Lodi, California, US

== Other uses ==
- Lodi (disambiguation)
