= Lodi High School =

Lodi High School can refer to one of many schools. The following list is ordered by state/province/territory and then municipality:

- Lodi High School (California) - Lodi, California
- Lodi High School (New Jersey) - Lodi, New Jersey
- Lodi High School (Wisconsin) - Lodi, Wisconsin

== See also ==
- Lodi (disambiguation)
- Lodi Public Schools
