= April 2016 North American storm complex =

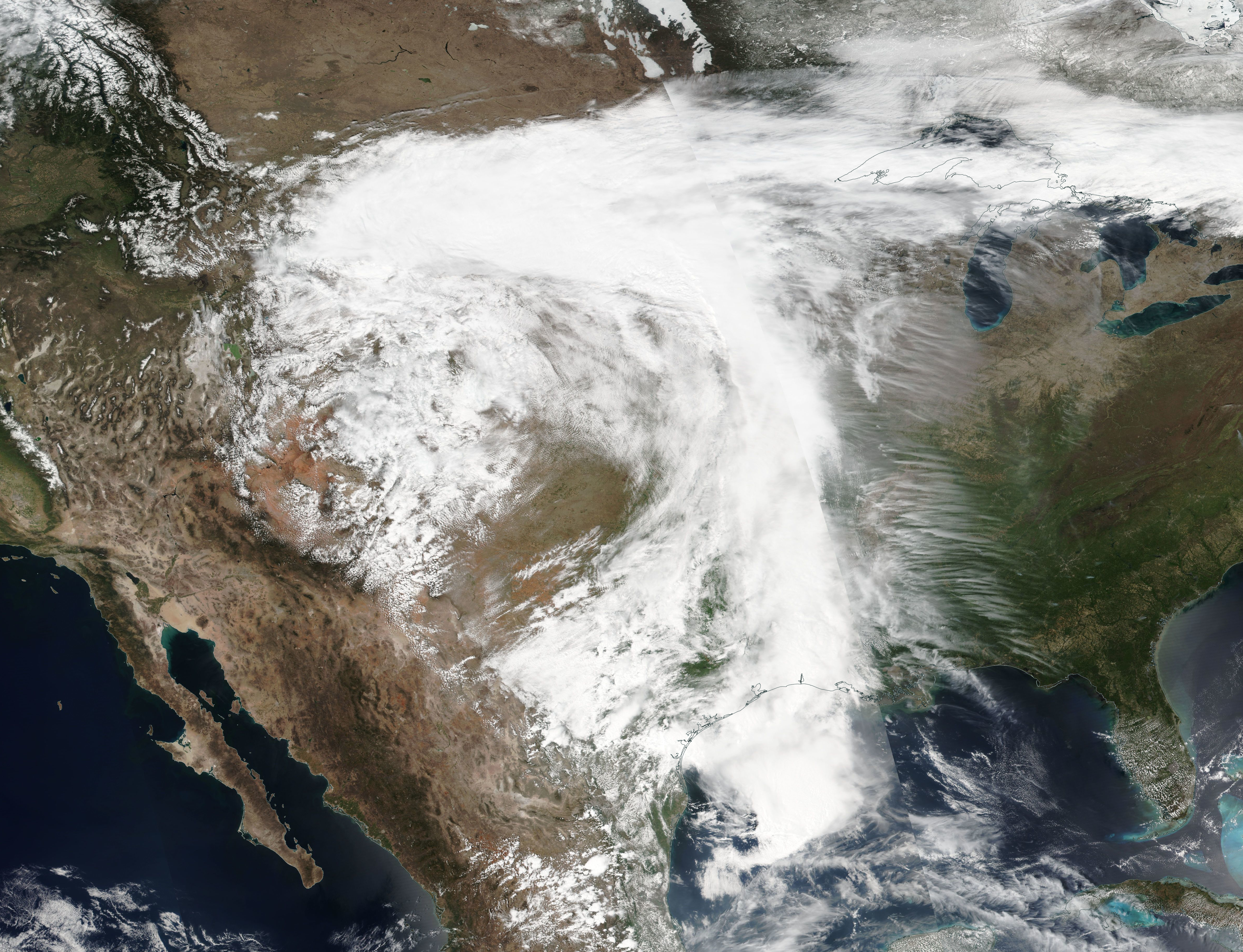
- The large upper-level low and accompanying cold front draped across the Central United States on April 18.

Meteorological history
- Formed: April 15, 2016
- Dissipated: April 23, 2016

Meteorological information
- Lowest pressure: 1006 hPa (mbar); 29.71 inHg
- Max. rainfall: Near 20 in (51 cm) around the Houston, Texas areas
- Max. snowfall: 51.3 in (130 cm) near Pinecliffe, Colorado

Overall effects
- Fatalities: 8 confirmed
- Damage: $2.7 billion
- Areas affected: Texas (especially the city of Houston), Western United States (Rocky Mountains)
- Power outages: 147,000
- Part of the 2015–16 North American winter and United States floods of 2016

The April 2016 North American storm complex was a major storm system that resulted from an upper-level low in the United States stalling and producing record-breaking rain in and around Houston, Texas, resulting in severe flooding, as well as a major snowstorm in the Rocky Mountains. There were more than 17 inches of rain in one day in parts of the city, and up to 4 inches of rain per hour that morning at George Bush Intercontinental Airport. It is described as the wettest April in the city on record.

As it was the most widespread flood event there since Tropical Storm Allison in 2001, a state of emergency was declared in nine counties.

== Meteorological history ==
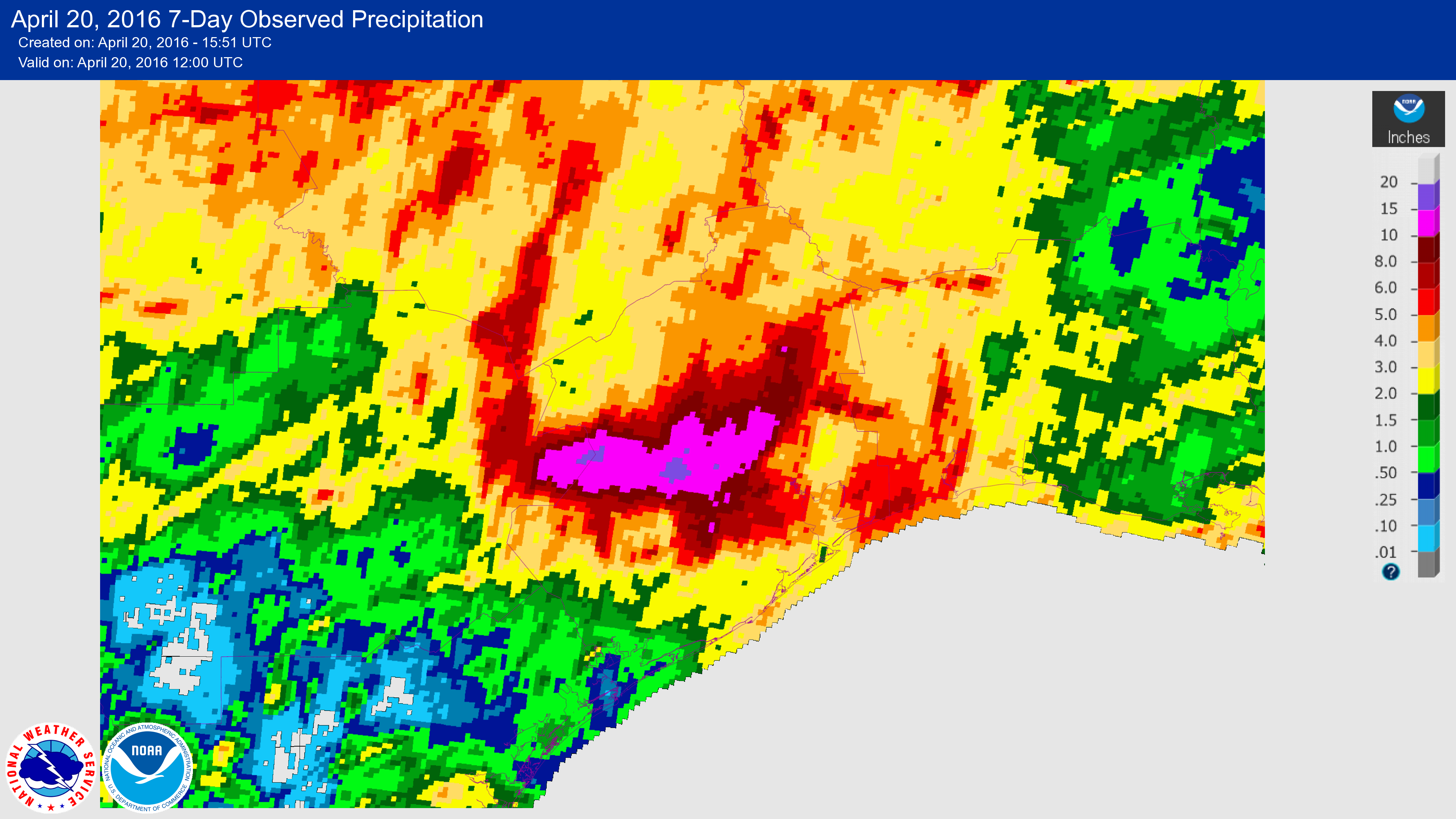
Map of accumulated precipitation in and around Houston, Texas, from April 13 to 20.

In mid-April 2016, a large, slow-moving upper-level low emerged from the Four Corners region in Rocky Mountains over the Central United States. Simultaneously, a ridge became anchored over the Eastern United States with another low to the east, creating an omega block—a stagnant weather pattern. The low near the Rockies pulled large quantities of moisture north from the Gulf of Mexico, leading to both heavy snow in the mountains and widespread heavy rain to the plains. During the overnight hours of April 15–18, a nearly stationary mesoscale convective system developed over the Houston Metropolitan Area. Southeasterly flow from a low level jet fueled the system with ample moisture, leading to widespread rainfall rates of 2 in (51 mm) per hour. Rainfall intensified throughout the night into the morning of April 18 with rainfall rates reaching 4 in (100 mm) per hour, leading to a life-threatening situation. At 4:39 a.m. CDT, a flash flood emergency was declared for parts of Colorado, Waller, Grimes, Montgomery, Harris, and Austin counties, later expanding to Fort Bend. In 12 hours from April 17 to 18, 12 in (300 mm) to 16 in (410 mm) of rainfall fell in Houston, causing flash flooding. Known as the Tax Day flood, the flooding caused at least five deaths and damaged over 10,000 homes in the Houston area.

Accumulations peaked at 17.6 in (450 mm) along Little Mound Creek at Mathis Road to the northwest of Houston. Other significant totals include 16.48 in (419 mm) along Cypress Creek at Sharp Road, 16.32 in (415 mm) along Langham Creek at Longenbaugh, and 16.22 in (412 mm) in Monaville. George Bush Intercontinental Airport saw 9.92 in (252 mm), bringing the monthly rainfall total to 11.38 in (289 mm). This marked the wettest April on record for Houston.

At the same time, the upper low produced a major snowstorm in the Rocky Mountains and High Plains from April 16–17. Due to the omega block, snowfall remained concentrated around the Denver metropolitan areas. Because of this, some snowfall totals ranged up to 3–4 feet (36–48 in) in some areas. This definitely led to areas coming close to breaking their top-snowiest days in April. A climate study analyzing the 2015 flood in Texas and Oklahoma has found an intensified El Niño effect on the climatologically wet season of spring, and the intensification has a trace of anthropogenic climate warming.

The upper low began to move eastward on April 19, as the omega block began to break down. It was expected to reach the East Coast by April 22, with much less rainfall totals as it began to accelerate.

== Impact ==
Over 47,000 customers lost power in Colorado, and to the west of Denver, portions of Interstate 70 closed. In addition, portions of Interstate 80 closed in southeastern Wyoming. The torrential rains resulted in widespread, severe flooding across Houston and surrounding suburbs—the worst since Tropical Storm Allison in 2001. 5 people died in flood-related incidents. In Harris County alone, more than 1,800 high water rescues were conducted; 744 homes and 400 apartments were inundated with water. School districts across the county suspended activities for two days to three days. Immediately after the storm, property damage was estimated at $5 billion.
