= I30 =

i30, I30, i-30 or I-30 may refer to:

- Interstate 30, an Interstate Highway in the southern United States
- Japanese submarine I-30, an Imperial Japanese Navy submarine during World War II
- HMAS Arunta (I30) (1940-1968), a Royal Australian Navy Tribal-class destroyer
- I30, a 9000 server model of computer system produced by the Hewlett-Packard (HP) company
- Hyundai i30, a small family car made by Korean automaker Hyundai Motor Company
- Infiniti I30, mid-size luxury car sold under Nissan's Infiniti marque in North American markets
- Korg i30, a 1998 keyboard instrument
- IBM NetVista Internet Appliance i30, allows internet access on a TV
- I-30 (aircraft), a prototype of the Yakovlev Yak-3
