= Lodi, Mississippi =

Lodi may refer to the following places in the U.S. state of Mississippi:

- Lodi, Humphreys County, Mississippi
- Lodi, Montgomery County, Mississippi
