= Lodi, Nevada =

Lodi
- Ghost Town
- Location within Nevada
- Coordinates: 38°59′38″N 117°52′42″W
- Country: United States
- State: Nevada
- County: Nye
- Founded: 1909; 117 years ago

Lodi is an extinct town in Nye County, in the U.S. state of Nevada. The GNIS classifies it as a populated place.

== History ==
The nearby Lodi mining district was established in 1874 with primary production occurring from 1920 until 1925. The population had increased to 100 by 1878 and had several businesses. Because of financial struggles for the Argent Company that owned most of the mines, Lodi was sold for a judgement against the company. Up until there were "discoveries" in the mines in 1905, the district had been very quiet. Following this, some success followed throughout the next years, but not enough for sustained activity, ultimately ending in 1929.

A post office was established at Lodi in 1909, and closed in 1910. A variant name is "Lodival".
