= 2015–16 North American winter =

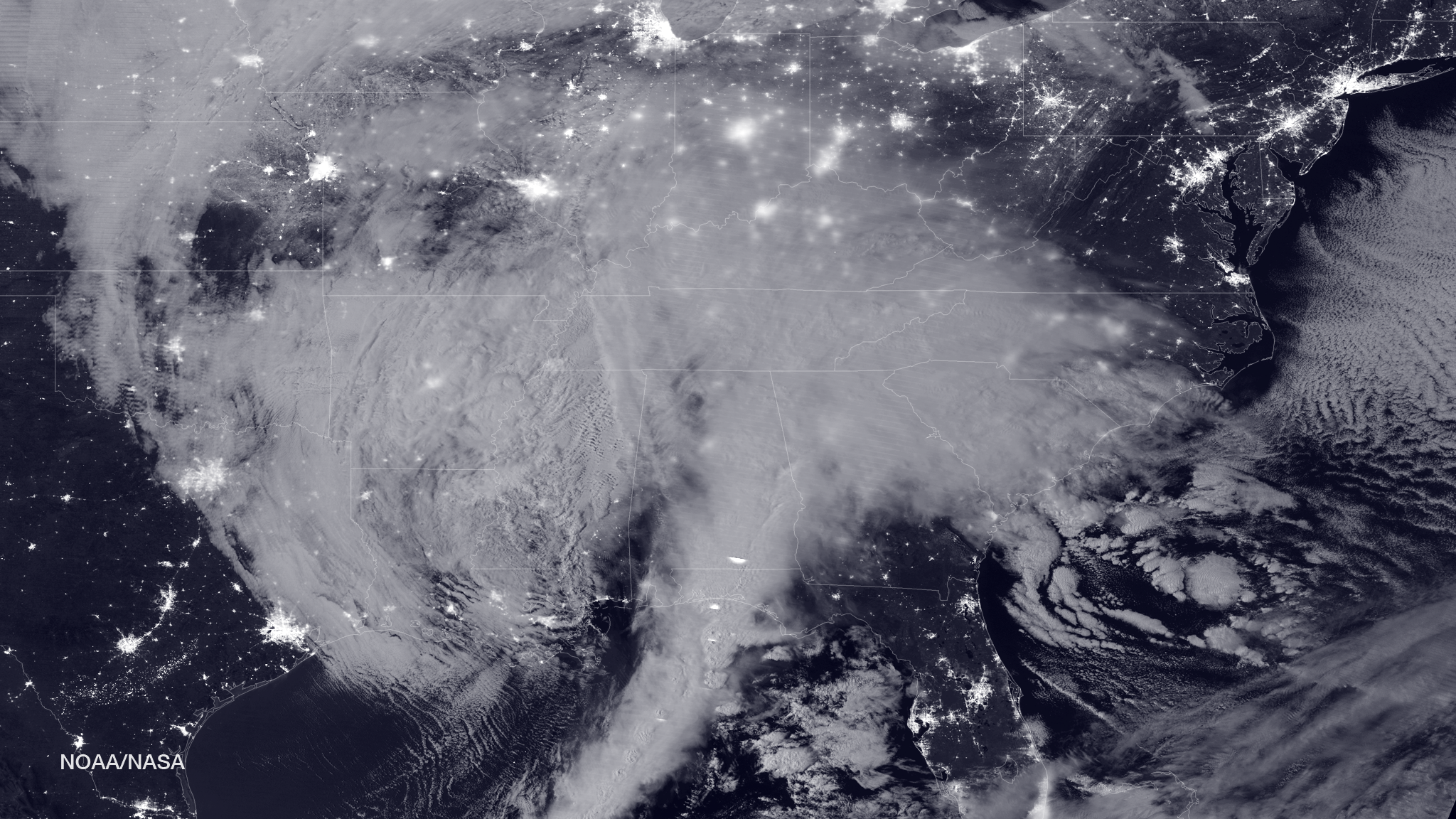
- Satellite image of a historic blizzard bearing down on the U.S. East Coast on January 22

Seasonal boundaries
- Meteorological winter: December 1 – February 29
- Astronomical winter: December 21 – March 20
- First event started: November 20, 2015
- Last event concluded: April 17, 2016

Most notable event
- Name: January 2016 United States blizzard
  - Duration: January 21–24, 2016
  - Lowest pressure: 983 mb (29.03 inHg)
  - Fatalities: 55 fatalities
  - Damage: $3 billion (2016 USD)

Seasonal statistics
- Total WPC-issued storms: 15 total
- Rated storms (RSI) (Cat. 1+): 3 total
- Major storms (RSI) (Cat. 3+): 1 total
- Maximum snowfall accumulation: 51.3 in (130 cm) at Pinecliffe, Colorado (April 15–23, 2016)
- Maximum ice accretion: 1.5 in (38 mm) in Eakly, Oklahoma (November 25–27, 2015)
- Total fatalities: 117 total
- Total damage: $7.2 billion (2016 USD)

Related articles
- 2015–16 UK and Ireland windstorm season

The 2015–16 North American winter was not as frigid across North America and the United States (especially the East Coast) as compared to the 2013–14 and 2014–15 winters. This was mainly due to a strong El Niño, which caused generally warmer-than-average conditions. However, despite the warmth, significant weather systems still occurred, including a snowstorm and flash flooding in Texas at the end of December and a large tornado outbreak at the end of February. The main event of the winter season, by far and large, was when a crippling and historic blizzard struck the Northeastern United States in late January, dumping up to 3 feet (36 in; 91 cm) of snow in and around the metropolitan areas. Several other smaller snow events affected the Northeast as well, but for the most part the heaviest snowstorms and ice stayed out further west, such as a severe blizzard in western Texas in late December (producing a tornado outbreak as well), and a major late-season snowstorm in Colorado in mid-April.

While there is no well-agreed-upon date used to indicate the start of winter in the Northern Hemisphere, there are two definitions of winter which may be used. Based on the astronomical definition, winter begins at the winter solstice, which in 2015 occurred late on December 21, and ends at the March equinox, which in 2016 occurred on March 20. Based on the meteorological definition, the first day of winter is December 1 and the last day February 29. Both definitions involve a period of approximately three months, with some variability. Winter is often defined by meteorologists to be the three calendar months with the lowest average temperatures. Since both definitions span the calendar year, it is possible to have a winter storm in two different years.

== Seasonal forecasts ==
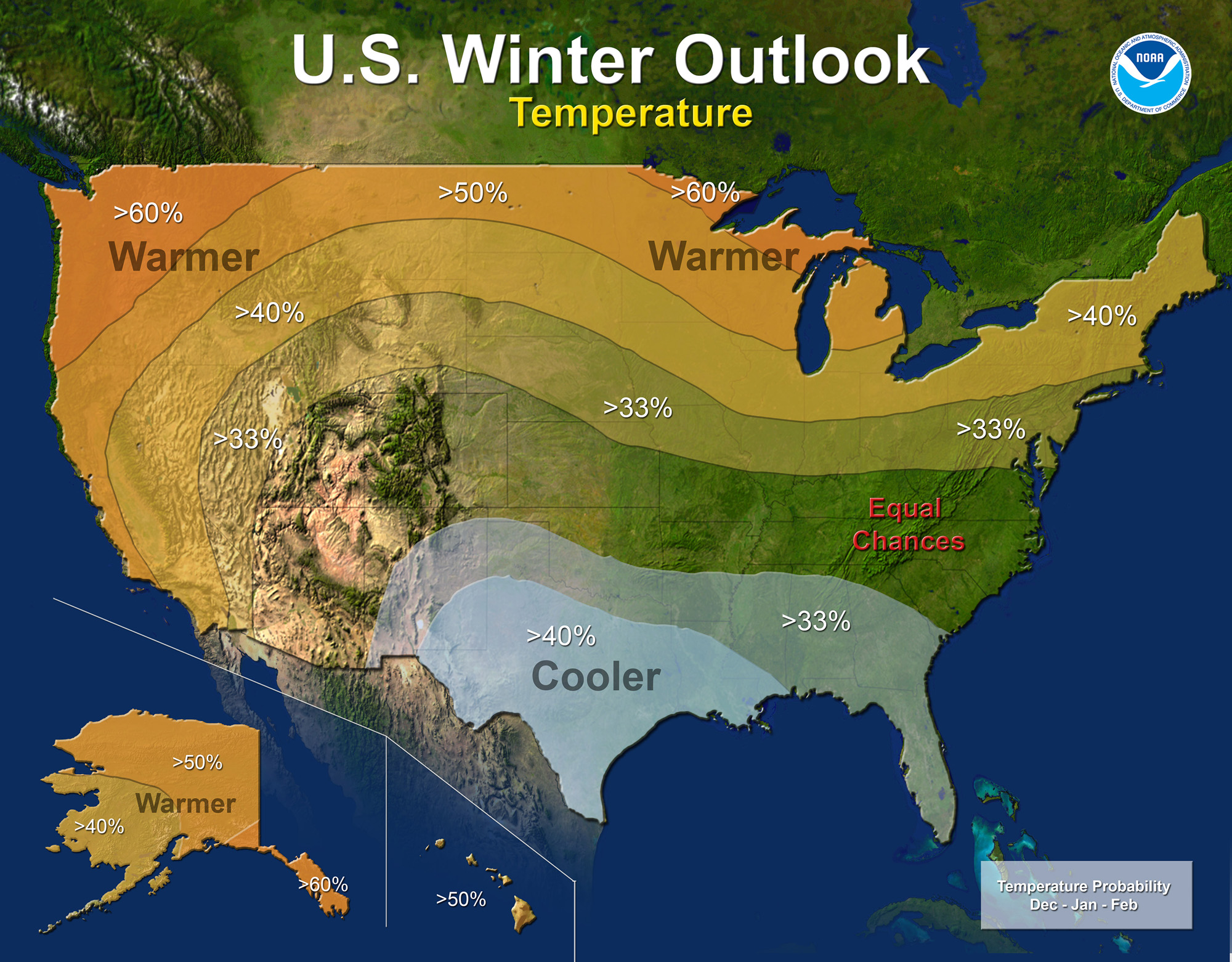
Temperature outlook

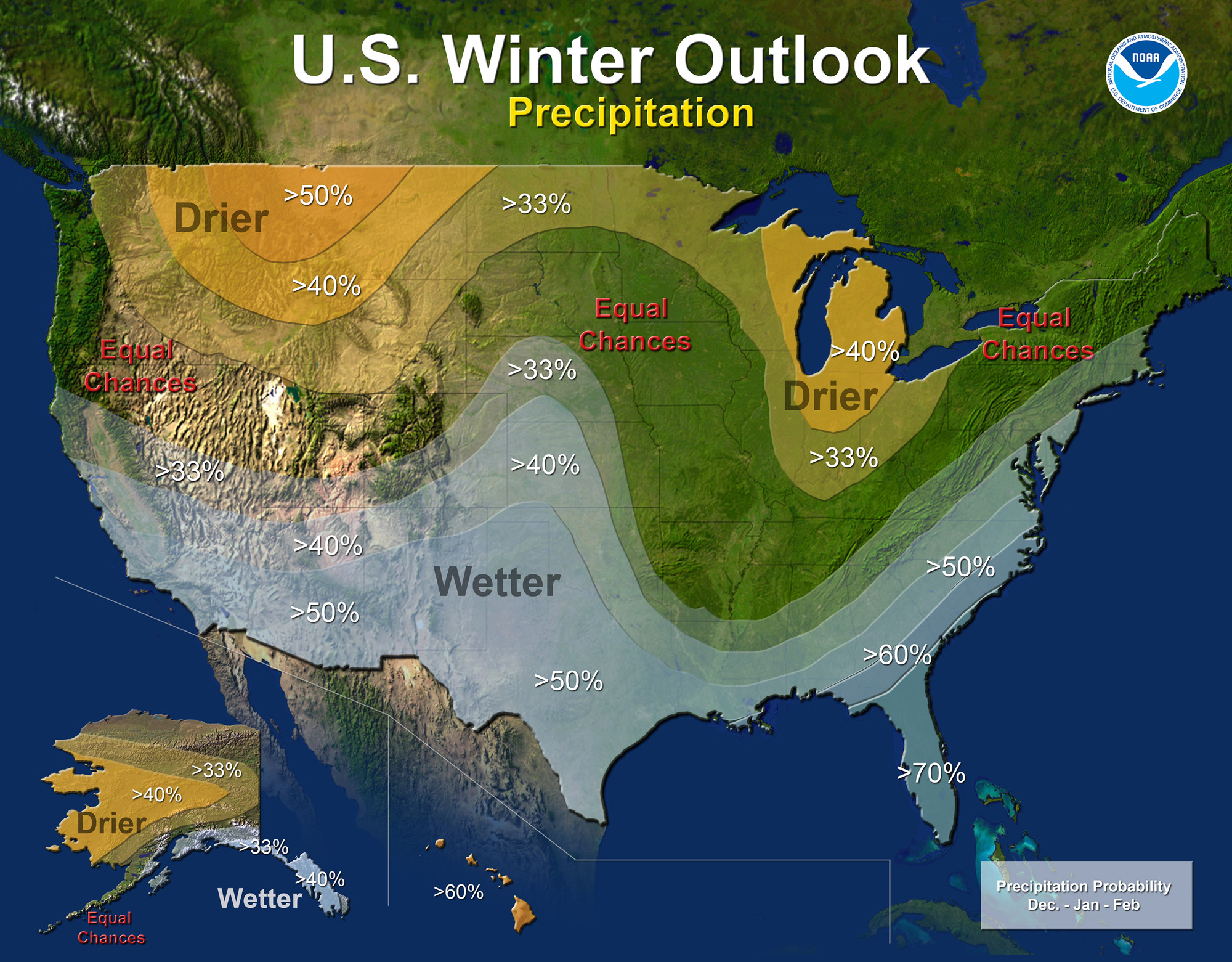
Precipitation outlook

On October 15, 2015, the National Oceanic and Atmospheric Administration's Climate Prediction Center issued its U.S. Winter Outlook. The presence of a strong El Niño event was expected to affect weather and climate patterns by influencing the position of the Pacific jet stream. According to CPC deputy director Mike Halpert at the time of the outlook, "A strong El Niño is in place and should exert a strong influence over our weather this winter" and "While temperature and precipitation impacts associated with El Niño are favored, El Niño is not the only player. Cold-air outbreaks and snow storms will likely occur at times this winter. However, the frequency, number and intensity of these events cannot be predicted on a seasonal timescale." Other oscillations anticipated to have some effect on winter in the United States were the Arctic oscillation and the Madden–Julian oscillation. The precipitation outlook indicated an elevated likelihood of above-average levels precipitation from central and southern California to Texas and Florida and northward to southern parts of New England. Above-average precipitation was also favored in southeastern Alaska, with below-average levels of precipitation favored in central and western Alaska, parts of the Northwestern U.S. and northern Rocky Mountain states, and areas in the vicinity of the Great Lakes and Ohio Valley.

The temperature outlook favored below-average temperatures in the southern Plains and Southeastern United States. Above-average temperatures were most favored across the West and the northern half of the contiguous United States and Alaska and Hawaii. The drought outlook anticipated improvement in conditions in central and southern California by the end of January 2016, noting the possibility of additional alleviation of drought conditions in February and March. The outlook favored the removal of drought across large parts of the Southwestern U.S., with additional lessening or elimination of drought conditions likely in the southern Plains. Drought conditions were expected to persist across the Pacific Northwest and northern Rocky Mountains, with development likely in Hawaii and areas in the vicinity of the northern Great Lakes region.

On November 30, 2015, Environment Canada issued its winter outlook for December, January, and February, as part of their monthly climate outlooks. Above-average temperatures were favoured throughout most of Canada, with the exception of northern Quebec and the southern tip of Baffin Island; areas that were considered the most likely to see above normal temperatures included the Lower Mainland of British Columbia, the Maritime provinces, southern Newfoundland, central Quebec and Ontario, and northern Manitoba and Saskatchewan; in those areas, the probability of above-normal temperatures was over 80%. The areas where below-normal temperatures were favoured included extreme northern areas of Quebec and Labrador, along with southern parts of Baffin Island. Above average precipitation was favoured in the Lower Mainland of B.C., New Brunswick, northern Quebec, northern Newfoundland, the Northwest Territories, and western Nunavut. Below-average precipitation was favoured on the south-eastern tip of Baffin Island and a small area just north of Lake Superior.

== Seasonal summary ==
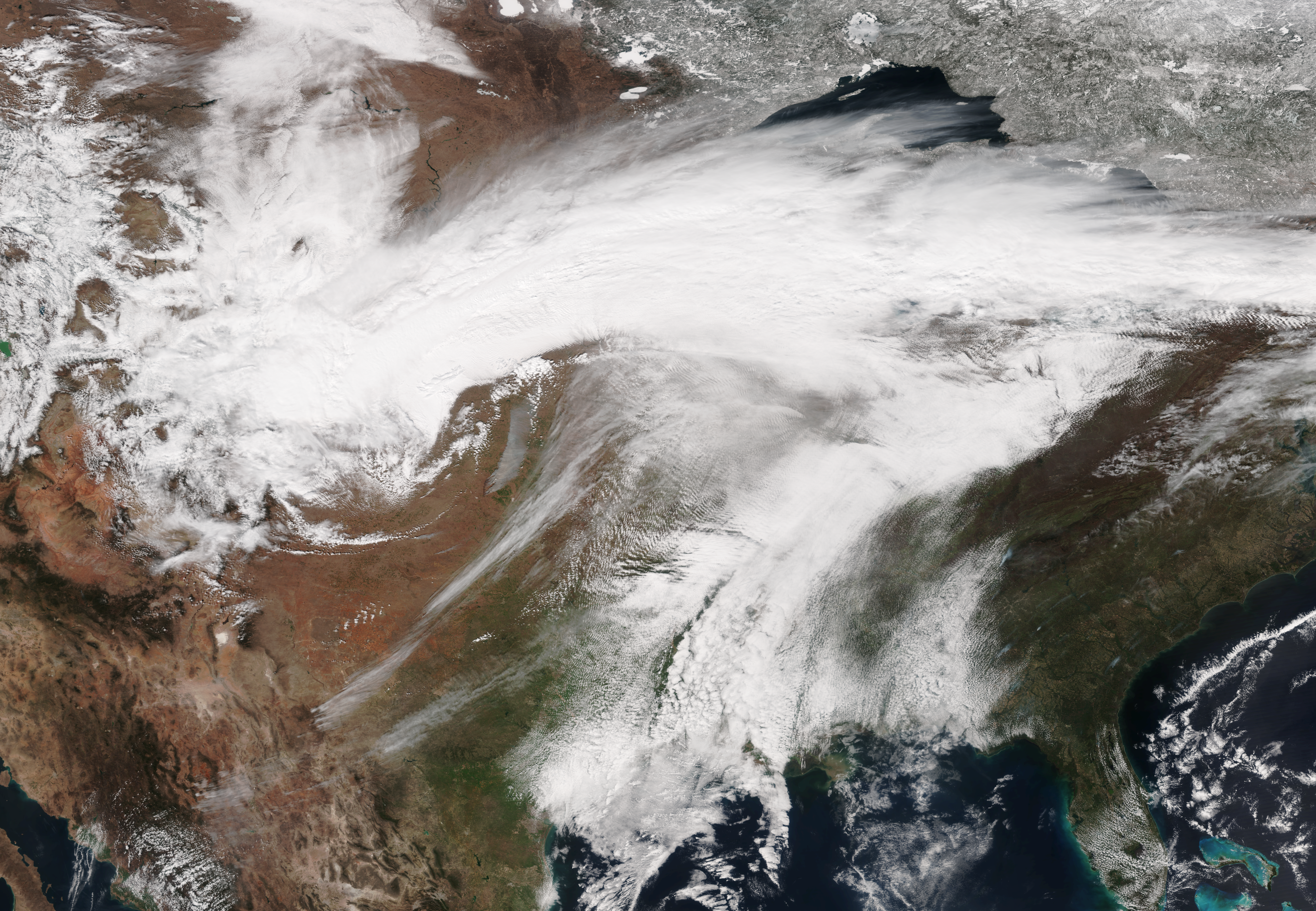
A winter storm moves through the Midwest, on March 23.

The winter of 2015–16 was quite unusual in terms of winter weather. First, around the end of November near Black Friday, a crippling ice storm hit the Southern and Central Plains with as much as 1.5 inches (38 mm) of ice accumulation in some areas, knocking out power to over 100,000 residents. In December, two winter storms impacted the Great Lakes, with the latter one being a bit farther to the west, both brought roughly a foot of snow in some locations. Normally, in this area, this is not common, but the super El Niño may have been a contributor to this. Following that, the nation had one of the warmest Decembers on record, with New York City being as warm as 72 °F (22 °C) on Christmas Eve (December 24). This was the warmest temperature in New York City in the second half of December on record. The low that day of 63 °F (17 °C) was the warmest December low on record in New York. In fact, across the Lower 48, this was the warmest and wettest December on record at the time. Every single state in the Northeastern United States saw a record warm December. In 2021, an even warmer December was recorded across the Lower 48, with a mean temperature of 39.3 °F (4.1 °C) rather than 38.6 °F (3.7 °C). This meant Buffalo, New York until December 18, a record for latest first snow. A strong tornado outbreak also occurred from December 23–25, which a very similar event had occurred the year before, just weaker. After this system passed, a larger storm complex moved through the same areas impacted by the ice storm from Black Friday 2015. This storm brought blizzard conditions to parts of Texas and New Mexico, with areas reaching up to close to 2 feet of snow in parts of Texas, which is a rare event in that state. For comparison, the last time this has occurred (or near the same areas), was in 2011 during the Groundhog Day blizzard.

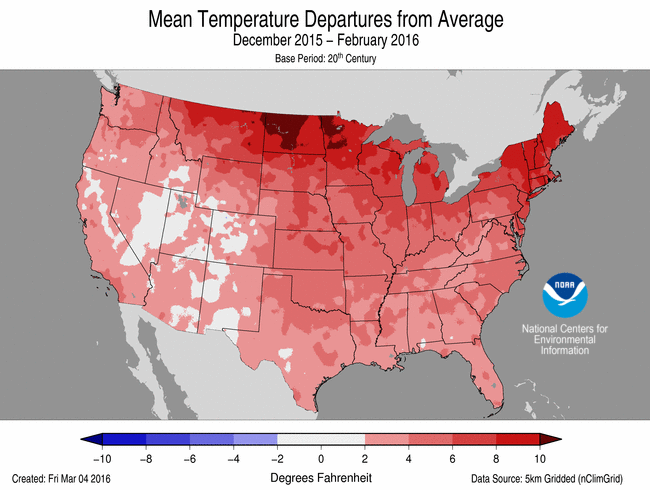
Average temperature anomaly for the winter in the United States. Not one state had below-average temperatures.

The month of January 2016 was variable in its weather patterns. Following the warm trend in December, an early cold snap brought close-to-average temperatures to the East Coast, at the same time a storm complex was moving through the Northeast, and due to the fresh batch of cold air, it was able to produce some snow on the back side of it. At the opposite end of the spectrum, the West Coast was receiving needed rainfall to help during its long-time drought. This brief period of relief soon ended. After that, around January 16–17, a potent storm system moved up the East Coast, bringing the first snowfall of the season to areas like Philadelphia and New York City. A few days later, an Alberta clipper moved through the central United States, producing a swath of snow from Illinois to North Carolina. This small system was then proceeded and eclipsed by a crippling and historic blizzard just days later on January 22–23. Cities like Washington D.C., Philadelphia, and New York City were buried with 1–2.5 feet (12–30 in) of snow, breaking numerous records. At the start of February, another snowstorm kicked off the month with a swath of snow from Colorado to Michigan. Snow accumulations ranged from 8–14 inches (20–36 cm), along with winds up to 45 mph (72 km/h). After the storm system passed, its cold front transformed into another snowstorm for the East Coast, with snowfall amounts up to 8 inches. Multiple winter storms proceeded to affect the Northeast during a two-week period in early-to-mid February, and the coldest air of the season arrived by February 14, parts of the Northeast on February 14, with temperatures dipping to as low as 0 °F (−18 °C), shattering many record low temperatures.

Historic flash flooding occurred in the southern U.S due to a very slow-moving system in early March. At the same time, record-breaking temperatures pushed into the Northeast, with some areas reaching into the low 80s. Later that month, another blizzard occurred in the High Plains, and dropped up to 30 inches (76 cm) of snow in parts of the High Plains and the Great Lakes through March 23–25, along with bringing a significant ice storm to parts of New England, with accumulations of 0.25–0.75 inches (6.4–19.1 mm) of ice in some areas. The final winter weather event occurred in mid-April, upper-level low stalled in the West, producing a major snowstorm that affected the High Plains and Rocky Mountains in areas near the Denver metropolitan area, dumping up to 4 feet (48 in) of heavy snow, which led to power outages. The storm also produced record rainfall of up to 20 inches (51 cm), leading to severe flash floods.

== Events ==
=== Late November ice storm ===
Around Black Friday of 2015, a major ice storm occurred in the Southern Central Plains, with areas receiving up to 1 inch (25 mm) of the frozen precipitation. Residents in the areas were without powers for days, if not weeks. The storm also brought snow to parts of the Midwest, with accumulations up to 1 foot (30 cm) of snow. Historic rainfall also fell too, breaking numerous records. On November 25, an area of low pressure system moved through the West and central Midwest, dropping snow of up to 1 foot (30 cm), and also brought the first cold blast of the winter season. At the same time, incoming moisture from weakening Hurricane Sandra in the East Pacific was starting to streak through Mexico into the southwestern United States. Interacting with the low pressure area, this combined to produce a plume of precipitation from ice to rain from southern Texas into Minnesota, due to high pressure situated off Maine keeping the Northeast dry for the holiday.

While causing a potent ice storm on its cold side, on the warm sector of the system, severe floods occurred as well, with areas like McKinney in Texas receiving up to 10.53 inches (26.7 cm) of rain over a 4-day period, causing major flooding. Some areas even broke their records for yearly rainfall totals from this system, due to the axis of moisture shooting into Canada. In total, 17 people died, including six in Kansas, three in Texas, three in Missouri and one in Utah, and over 110,000 left without power, especially around Oklahoma City.

=== Post-Christmas storm complex ===
- Category 0 "Nuisance" (RSI/NOAA: N/A)
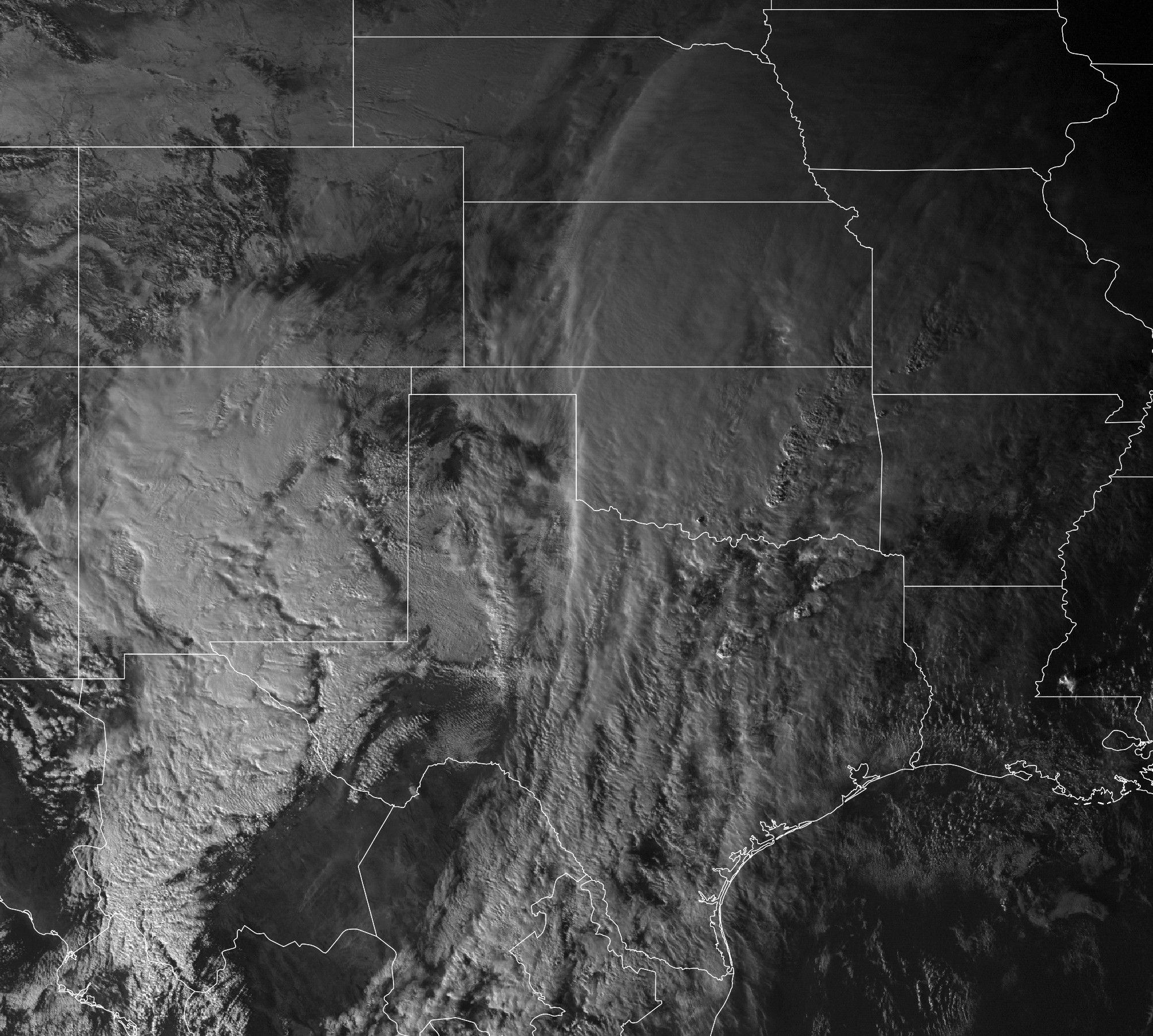
- Duration: December 25 – December 28, 2015
- Lowest pressure: 989 mb (29.21 inHg)
- Maximum snow: 41 in (100 cm)
- Fatalities: 59 fatalities
- Damage: $3 billion (2015 USD)

Two days after Christmas, a large storm complex with snow, severe weather and heavy rainfall impacted the Southern Plains and southern Rocky Mountains, including all or parts of the states of Colorado, New Mexico, Texas and Oklahoma. The system spawned tornadoes over central and eastern Texas and Oklahoma, while bringing blizzard conditions to the Texas and Oklahoma panhandles, most areas in New Mexico, and southern Colorado. The main area of low pressure moved northeast from the southern Plains to the eastern Great Lakes, while a secondary low pressure system formed east of the Delmarva Peninsula on December 29. After impacting New Mexico and the Texas panhandle with record snowfall, the storm system left a swath of snow and ice accumulation from western Oklahoma to Michigan. On December 29, the storm system brought a mix of snow, sleet and freezing rain to New York State and New England.

On December 26, 2015, it affected parts of the Texas Panhandle and resulted in the formation of tornadoes in the Dallas area, including an EF4 which struck the Garland area that evening.

=== Mid-January Mid-Atlantic snowstorm ===
A relatively minor storm, similar to an Alberta clipper, caught numerous drivers off-guard, producing a brief period of heavy snow during rush hour in the Mid-Atlantic region on January 20. Although only 1 in (2.5 cm) of snow fell in Washington, D.C., roadways were not treated; any snow that melted on roads quickly froze into black ice, rendering them impassable. Some referred to the event as "Carmageddon 2.0". Portions of Interstate 95 and Interstate 495 in Virginia and Maryland (especially on the Woodrow Wilson Bridge), as well as Interstate 270, were brought to a standstill through the early hours of January 21. Virginia State Police responded to 767 accidents and 392 reports of disabled vehicles. The Virginia Department of Transportation mobilized 115 salt trucks to clear roads. A man was killed after being struck by a snow plow in Beltsville, Maryland. Washington, D.C. Mayor Muriel Bowser issued an apology for inadequate preparations in the wake of the storm on January 22. Vehicles in Maryland became stranded, with some residents abandoning their cars altogether.

Georgia Governor Nathan Deal issued a state of emergency for northern counties on January 19, ensuring areas were better prepared than during a similar storm in 2014. Icy conditions prompted road closures in northern Georgia, including portions of Interstate 75; several crashes resulted from the dangerous conditions. Similar conditions affected Tennessee and Kentucky; schools closed on account of dangerous roads. One person died and another was injured in an accident in Knox County after speeding on slippery roads. Two deaths resulted from snow-related car accidents in North Carolina. Another person died, and two others were injured, when a car collided with a salt truck in Whitley County, Kentucky.

=== Late January blizzard ===
- Category 5 "Extreme" (RSI/NOAA: 20.14)
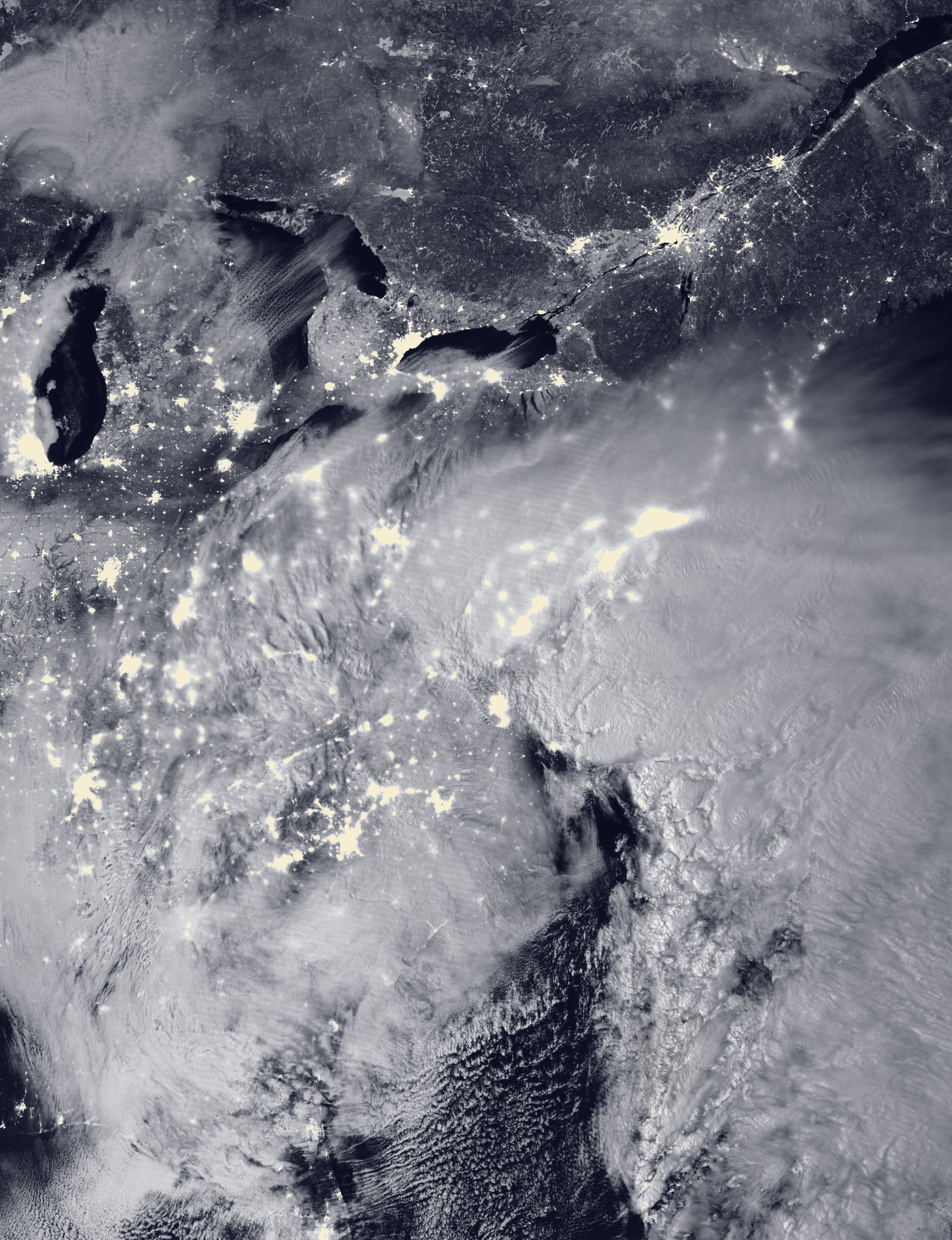
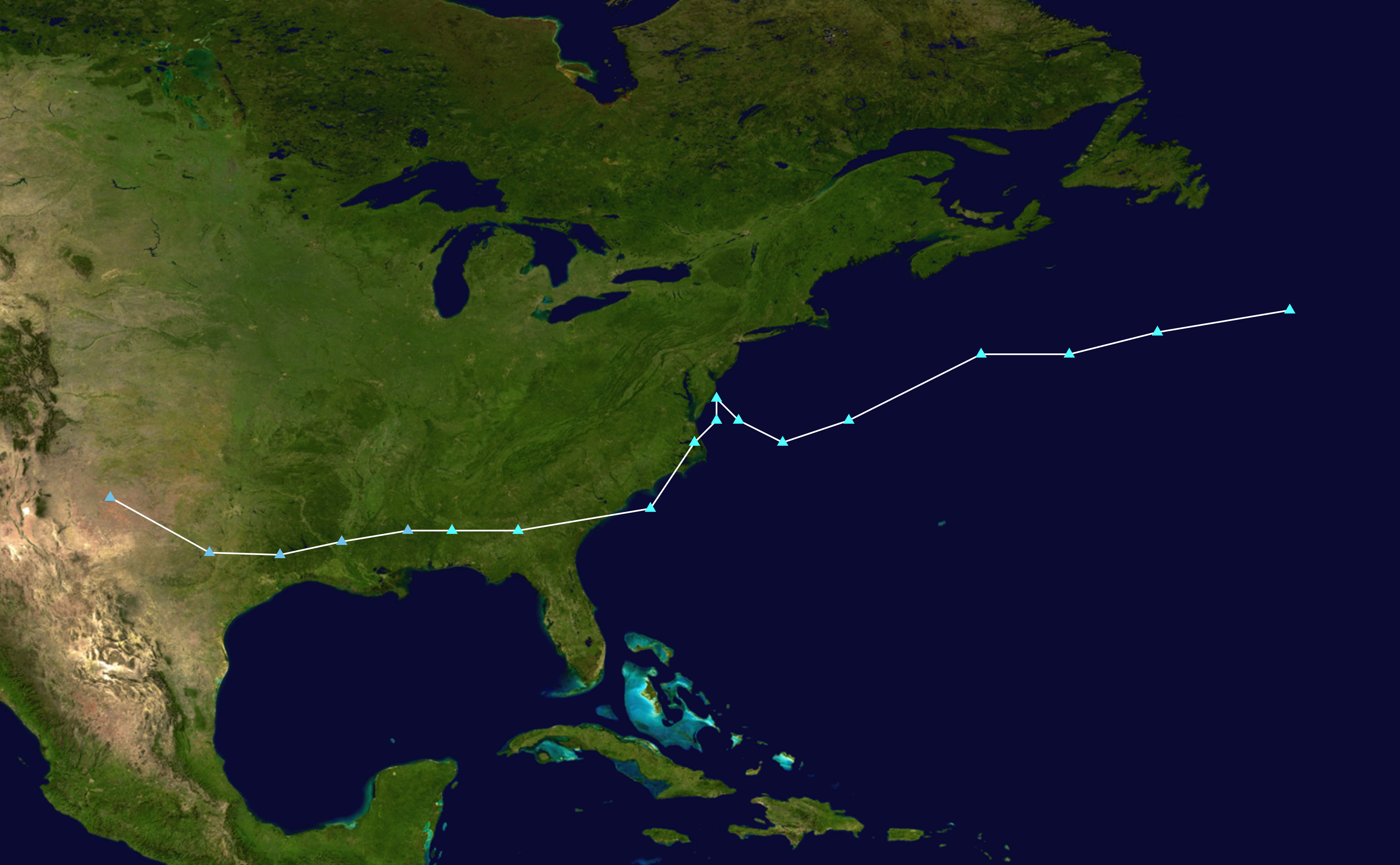
- Duration: January 21 – January 23, 2016
- Lowest pressure: 983 mb (29.03 inHg)
- Maximum snow: 42 in (110 cm)
- Fatalities: 55 fatalities
- Damage: $3 billion (2016 USD)

A crippling and historic blizzard occurred from January 22–23 in the Mid-Atlantic states. The storm was given various unofficial names, including Winter Storm Jonas, Blizzard of 2016, and Snowzilla among others. The highest reported snowfall was 40 inches (100 cm) in Glengary, West Virginia. Locations in five states exceeded 30 inches (76 cm) of snow. The storm dropped 18 inches (46 cm) of snow in Washington, D.C., 22 inches in Philadelphia, 26 inches (66 cm) in Baltimore, 30.5 inches (77 cm) in New York City. States of emergency were declared in Maryland, North Carolina, Pennsylvania, Tennessee, West Virginia, Virginia, Delaware, New York, and Washington, D.C. The storm also caused coastal flooding in Delaware and New Jersey. Cape May, New Jersey set a record high water level at 8.98 feet (2.74 m), higher than the 8.90 feet (2.71 m) seen during Hurricane Sandy. High winds led to blizzard conditions in many areas. Sustained winds of 59 miles per hour (95 km/h) with gust of 72 mph (116 km/h) were recorded in Delaware. 70 miles per hour (110 km/h) gusts were also recorded in Massachusetts.

=== Groundhog Day winter storm ===
- Category 2 "Significant" (RSI/NOAA: 4.68)
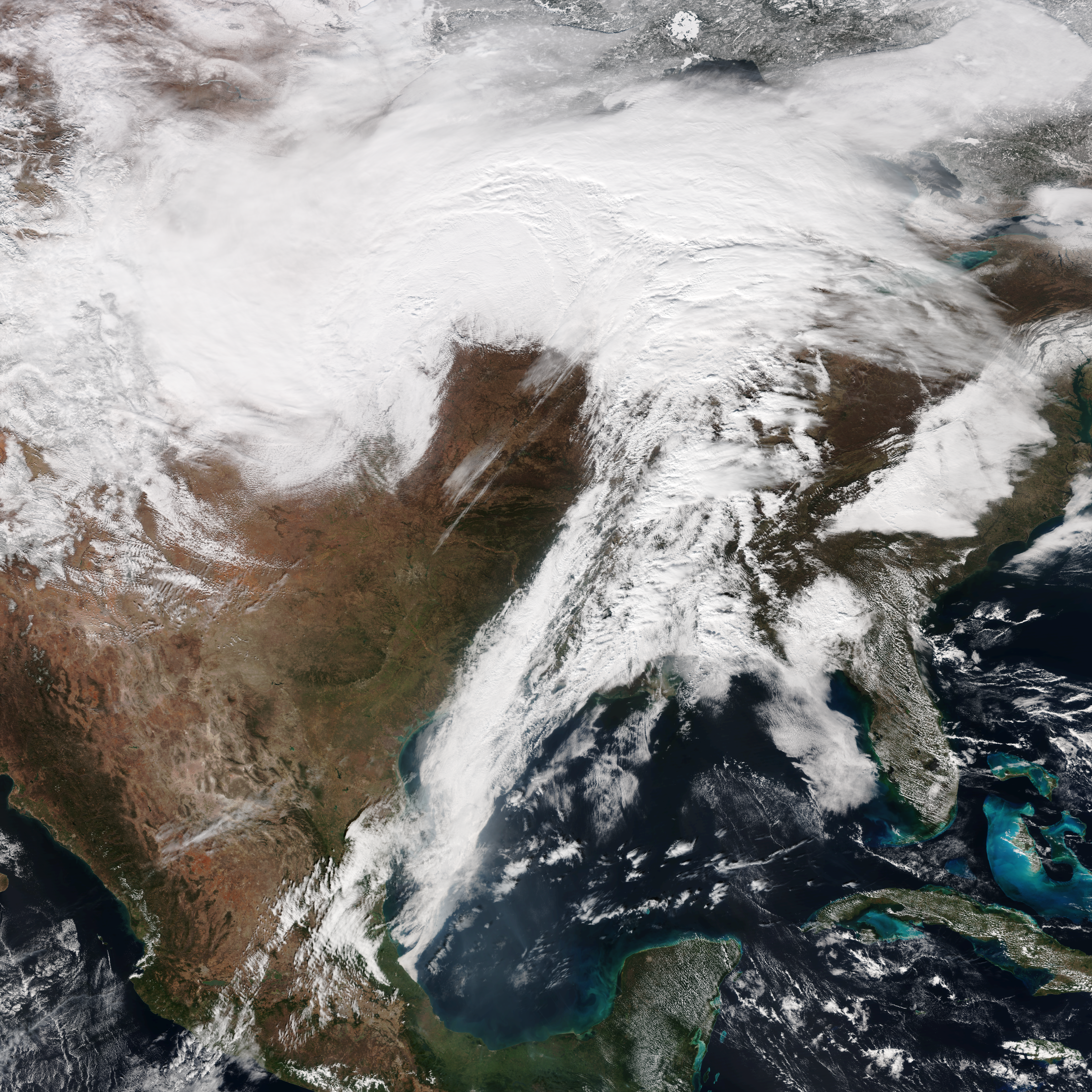
- Duration: January 30 – February 7, 2016
- Lowest pressure: 992 mb (29.29 inHg)
- Maximum snow: 41 in (100 cm)
- Fatalities: 7 fatalities

A trailing low pressure system to the previous weeks' blizzard had developed offshore California on January 29. The low and accompanying precipitation moved onshore the next day. At the time blizzard conditions were expected. The storm moved eastward into the Great Plains where tremendous snowfall occurred. On February 1, another area of low pressure led to severe weather across the Southeastern United States. Multiple tornadoes were reported in Alabama, Mississippi and Tennessee, including a large EF2 tornado. After the storm had passed, the cold front associated with it stalled over the East Coast late on February 4. A new low pressure developed off North Carolina that night and started to track up the coast. It impacted areas already hit hard by the previous blizzard about two weeks prior, and caused messy travel along Interstate 95 (Northeast). The storm brought a quick but moderate-to-heavy burst of steady snow, with some areas in New England receiving up to 1 foot (0.30 m).

=== Early February nor'easter ===
- Category 0 "Nuisance" (RSI/NOAA: N/A)
- Duration: February 6 – February 9, 2016
- Lowest pressure: 976 mb (28.82 inHg)
- Maximum snow: 11 in (28 cm)

On February 7, an elongated area of low pressure developed offshore to the west of Florida. While moving inland, it produced a decent dose of rainfall to the Sunshine State as it moved to the northeast. Later the same day, it moved offshore into the Atlantic Ocean and began to undergo bombogenesis, its pressure dropping from 1,004 millibars (29.6 inHg) at 7 a.m. EST February 7 to 979 millibars (28.9 inHg) at 1 a.m. EST February 8. As it did so, it also began to transition into a nor'easter, as rainbands began to impact the eastern edges of North Carolina and South Carolina. There was some cold air aloft, allowing for a few areas of wet snow to develop further inland. As the cyclone continued to strengthen, it started to achieve the conditions of a bomb cyclone. Furthermore, the system started to form an eye compared to that of a typical Category 1 hurricane, however this was short-lived and dissolved a few hours later. Snowbands began to impact New England early in the morning of February 8, with some bands reaching up to snowfall rates of an inch per hour, especially near the coast. The outermost bands did not reach New Jersey and New York City, due to the nor'easter being far offshore. The storm continued to deepen for a few more hours before reaching its peak intensity of 976 millibars (28.8 inHg). The system then continued to weaken as it moved northward, before finally merging with another low pressure system on February 10 to the south of it which had also exited from the East Coast.

=== Mid-February cold wave ===
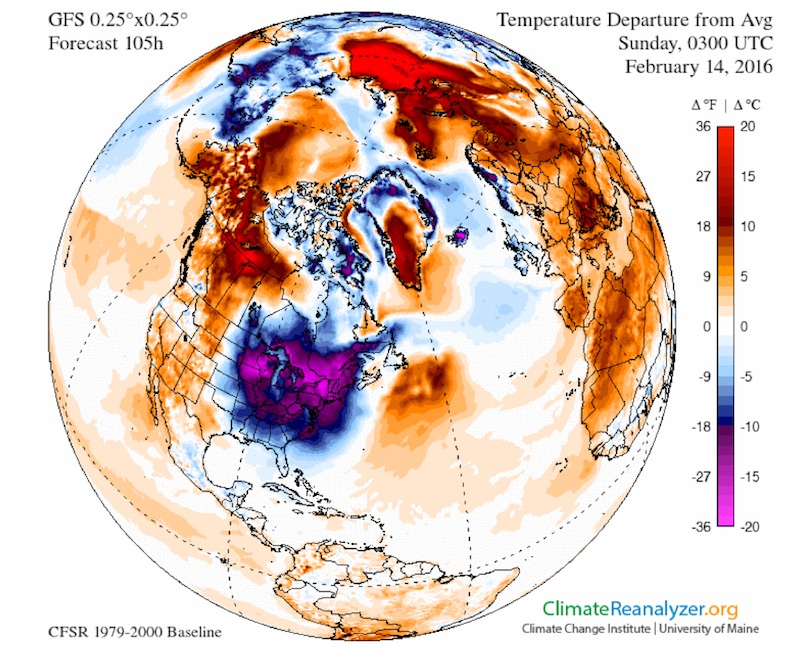
Predicted average temperature departure for Sunday, Feb. 14. Note the large area of dark blue and purple over the Northeast, signifying very cold temperatures.

During mid-February, record-breaking cold temperatures swung across the Northeast United States and southeastern Canada. On 13 February 2016, Whiteface Mountain underwent a record windchill of −114 °F (−81 °C), while in Boston, Massachusetts, the temperature dropped to −9 °F (−23 °C), the coldest since 1957. The windchill descended to −36 °F (−38 °C), surpassing the previous record by 6 °F (−14 °C). In Toronto, Ontario, the NBA All-Star Weekend took place in temperatures of −23 °C (−9 °F) and wind chills near −40 °C (−40 °F), causing some players and visitors to complain about the cold. The recorded temperatures were the coldest recorded since a very similar cold wave impacted the region exactly a year prior. In New York City, the temperature in Central Park gets below 0 °F (−18 °C) for the first time since January 19, 1994, and the windchill at JFK Airport on February 14 at 6:30am hit −19 °F (−28 °C). The low of −1 °F (−18 °C) set a record for the coldest Valentines Day on record. Bridgeport, Connecticut experienced its coldest February temperature, and 2nd coldest all time temperature, at −6 °F (−21 °C). Meanwhile, Binghamton hit −18 °F (−28 °C). Windchills in Worcester, Massachusetts sunk to −44 °F (−42 °C).

In spite of −1 °F (−18 °C) temperatures in New York on February 14, by February 16, the temperature reached 54 °F (12 °C). Meanwhile, despite Toronto having a windchill on February 14 of −34 °C (−29 °F), the next day it felt like −1 °C (30 °F).

=== Late February storm complex ===
On February 23, a low-pressure area developed near the east end of Texas and began to track northeastwards into the Mid-Atlantic States in the early hours of February 24. During this period, it also began to interact with some cold air on the back side of it, producing snow and ice in parts of the Ohio Valley, dumping as much as 17.0 inches (43 cm) of snow. At the same time, ahead of the cold front, severe thunderstorms developed ahead of it, which would eventually lead to the second largest tornado outbreak of the month of February.

=== March extreme weather events ===
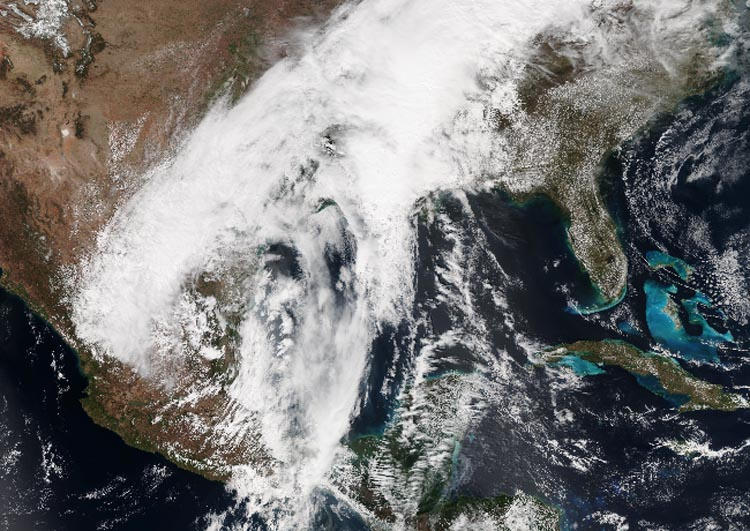
NASA satellite image of the storm system responsible for the record flooding in the South and record warmth in the Northeast. Taken March 10, 2016.

On March 7, an area of low pressure system from the Pineapple Express moved ashore in California as part of the pattern change that allowed the Golden State to receive much-needed rain. Late that evening, it dove into Mexico where it became detached from the main jet stream. It then stalled for a few days and caused some extreme weather events, such as record-breaking heat in the Northeast, with areas achieving their earliest 80 °F (27 °C) day on record, which was the result of high pressure off the coast of Florida. It also caused historic floods in the South as well. Areas in Louisiana picked up to over 15 inches (38 cm) of rain, setting numerous records and triggering multiple flash floods from the extreme rainfall. The highest rainfall report was 23.22 inches (59.0 cm) near Monroe in Louisiana. The historic events also caused rare snow in Mexico, which rarely receives snow at all.

=== Late March blizzard ===
- Category 0 "Nuisance" (RSI/NOAA: N/A)
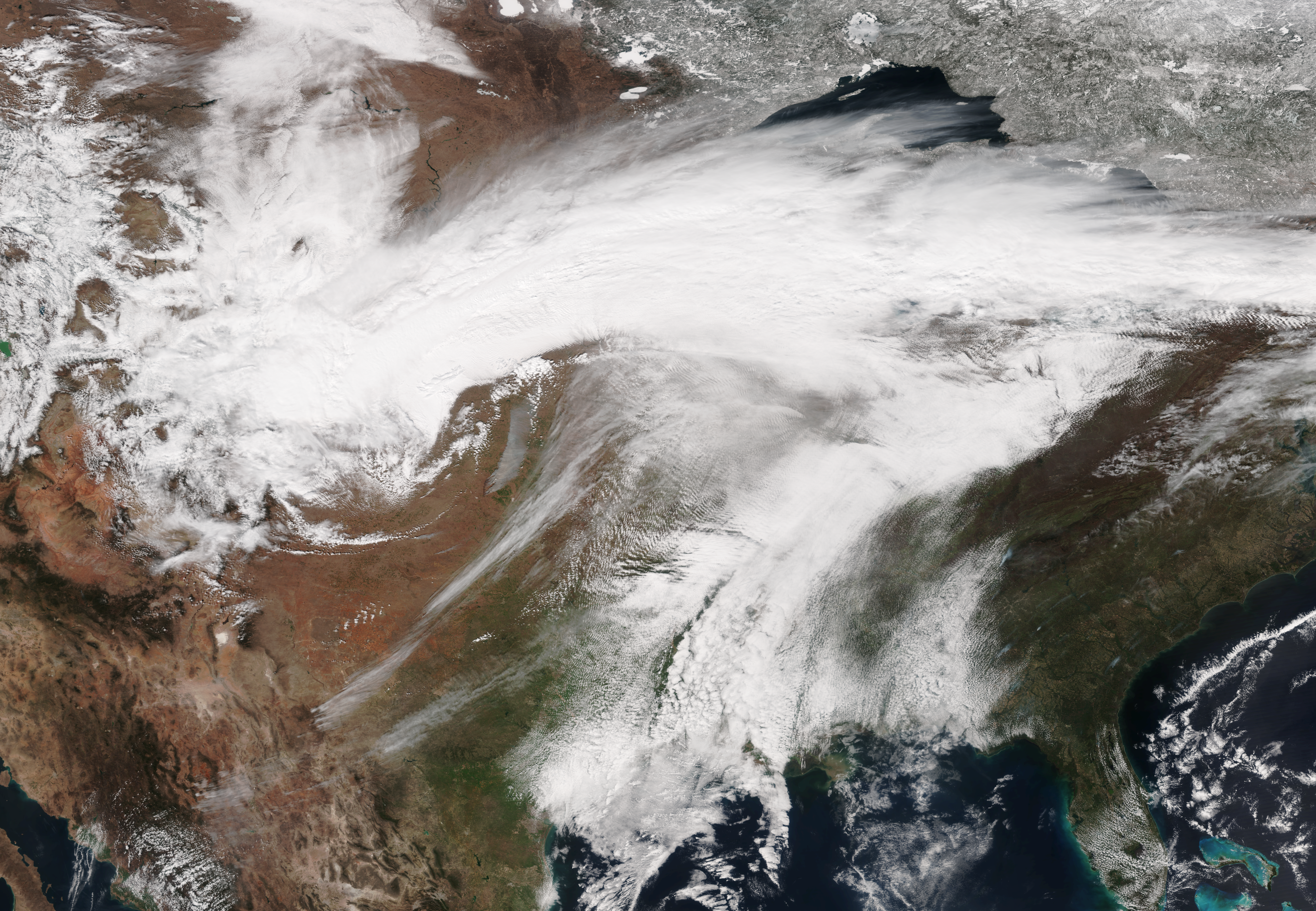
- Duration: March 21 – March 25, 2016
- Lowest pressure: 989 mb (29.21 inHg)
- Maximum snow: 32.5 in (83 cm)
- Fatalities: 2 fatalities

On March 21, an area of low pressure moved ashore on the West Coast, with a limited amount of moisture available. Because of this precipitation was originally isolated. As it moved eastward on March 22 it started to intensify and as such snowfall began to become widespread. The storm also began to transition into an extratropical cyclone, achieving a peak of 989 millibars (29.2 inHg) two times on March 23. Blizzard warnings were issued for areas around Denver due to the strong winds accompanying the system along with snowfall. Parts of Interstate 80 were shut down due to the extreme winter weather conditions. During the storm, Denver International Airport was shut down. Ahead of its cold front, thunderstorms began to fire up, prompting the National Weather Service to issue a tornado watch. A squall line later developed out of this as more storms began to fire up and move eastwards, with the severe weather threat shifting more to the east towards the East Coast. The system also brought ice accumulations from 0.25–0.75 inches (6.4–19.1 mm) from the Midwest into New England. It then rapidly weakened and moved offshore late on March 25, dissipating the next day.

=== Early April blizzard ===
On April 4, a snowstorm occurred in Massachusetts, with Boston's Logan International Airport recording 4.7 inches of snow. Other Massachusetts towns experienced much heavier snowfall, with Freetown getting 7.5 inches of snow and Plymouth getting 9.3 inches of snow.

=== Mid-April storm complex ===
- Category 0 "Nuisance" (RSI/NOAA: N/A)
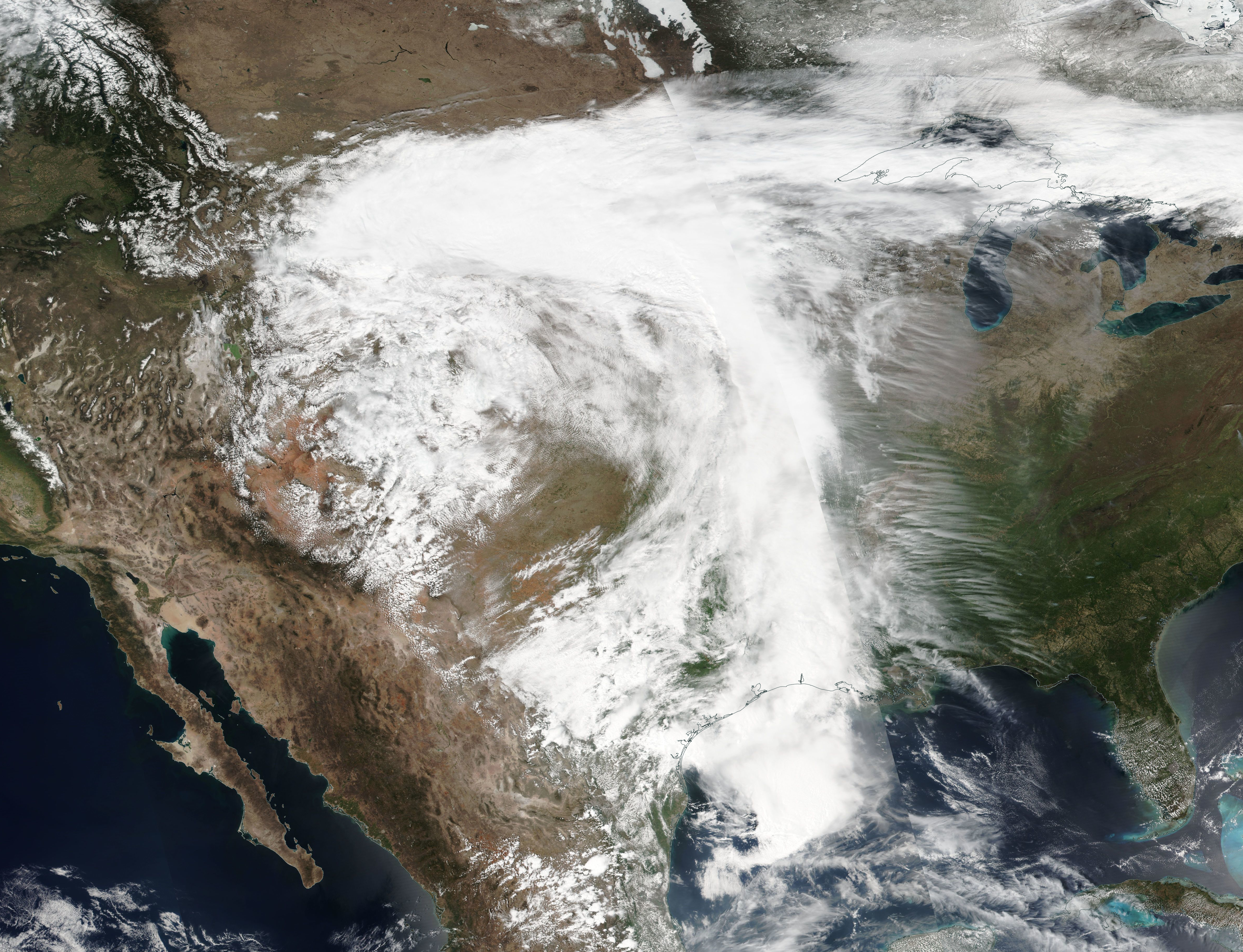
- Duration: April 16 – April 19, 2016
- Lowest pressure: 1006 mb (29.71 inHg)
- Maximum snow: 51.4 in (131 cm)
- Fatalities: 8 fatalities
- Damage: $2.7 billion (2016 USD)

On April 13, an area of disturbed weather associated with the jet stream moved ashore on the West Coast. Moving slowly it dived into the High Plains and Rocky Mountains during the course of the day on April 14. The upper-level low associated began to stall in the area and became cut off from the jet stream, while simultaneously producing a major snowstorm in the Rocky Mountains (with up to as much as 4 feet (48 in) of snowfall reported) and areas around the Denver metropolitan area and soaked the Central Plains and areas to the south with heavy rain (up to 20 inches (51 cm) of rainfall was reported early on April 18), flooding, severe thunderstorms, and possibly tornadoes. Multiple rescue efforts had to be made in southeastern Texas early on April 18, due to the extremely heavy rainfall and flooding. The upper low gradually moved out of the region by April 19, alas at a very slow rate.

== Records ==
=== United States ===
The city of Boston, Massachusetts recorded its second-warmest winter in recorded history. and New York City (behind 2001–02) The month of December was the wettest on record in the Lower 48, as a result of persistent storminess and weather systems throughout the month. Due to the January 2016 United States blizzard, multiple towns recorded their Highest snowfall from a single snowstorm, including the towns of Allentown, Pennsylvania, Philadelphia, Pennsylvania, Newark, New Jersey, New York City and Harrisburg, Pennsylvania John F. Kennedy International Airport had its snowiest January on record. Atlanta, Georgia, and La Crosse, Wisconsin saw their second-wettest winter on record, while Waterloo, Iowa, and Lincoln, Nebraska had their wettest winter on record.

== Season effects ==
This is a table of all of the events that have occurred in the 2015–16 North American winter. It includes their duration, damage, impacted locations, and death totals. Deaths in parentheses are additional and indirect (an example of an indirect death would be a traffic accident), but were still related to that storm. All of the damage figures are in 2016 USD.

Regional snowfall index scale
C0	C1	C2	C3	C4	C5

2015–16 North American winter season statistics
Event name	Dates active	RSI category	RSI value	Highest gust mph (km/h)	Minimum pressure (mbar)	Maximum snow in (cm)	Maximum ice in (mm)	Areas affected	Damage (2016 USD)	Deaths
Late November ice storm	November 25 – 27	N/A	N/A	N/A	N/A	12 (30)	1 (25)	Central United States	Unknown	17
Post-Christmas storm complex	December 26 – 29	N/A	N/A	N/A	989	41 (104)	N/A	Southwestern, Central, and New England regions in the United States (particularly Texas); Northern Mexico; Southeastern Canada	>$3 billion	21
Late January blizzard	January 21 – 23	Category 5	20.14	85 (135)	983	42 (110)	0.75 (19)	Pacific Northwest, Great Plains, South Central United States, Eastern United States (especially the Mid-Atlantic states), Atlantic Canada, British Isles, Finland	$3 billion	55
Early February winter storm	January 30 – February 7	Category 2	4.68	N/A	992	41 (100)	N/A	Western United States, Central United States, Southeastern United States, Northeastern United States	Unknown	7
Early February nor'easter	February 6 – 9	N/A	N/A	65 (105)	976	11 (28)	N/A	Northeastern United States, Atlantic Canada	Unknown	N/A
Late February tornado outbreak & winter storm	February 23 – 24	N/A	N/A	N/A	N/A	17 (43)	0.7 (18)	Eastern United States, Canada	$1.2 billion	7
Late March blizzard	March 21 – 25	N/A	N/A	N/A	989	32.5 (83)	N/A	Northeastern United States, Canada	Unknown	2
Mid-April storm complex	April 16 – 19	N/A	N/A	N/A	1006	51.3 (130)	N/A	Western United States (Rocky Mountains)	Unknown	8
Season aggregates
3 RSI storms	November 20 – April 17				976	51.3 (130)	1.5 (38)		≥ $7.2 billion	117

== See also ==
- 2015–16 UK and Ireland windstorm season

Preceded by 2014–15	North American winters 2015–16	Succeeded by 2016–17
