= Loda, West Virginia =

Loda
- Unincorporated community
- Location within the state of West Virginia Loda (the United States)
- Coordinates: 38°48′4″N 80°4′55″W
- Country: United States
- State: West Virginia
- County: Randolph
- Elevation: 2,352 ft (717 m)
- Time zone: UTC-5 (Eastern (EST))
  - Summer (DST): UTC-4 (EDT)
- GNIS ID: 1549790

Loda is an unincorporated community in Randolph County, West Virginia, United States.
