= Lodi Township, Michigan =

- Civil township
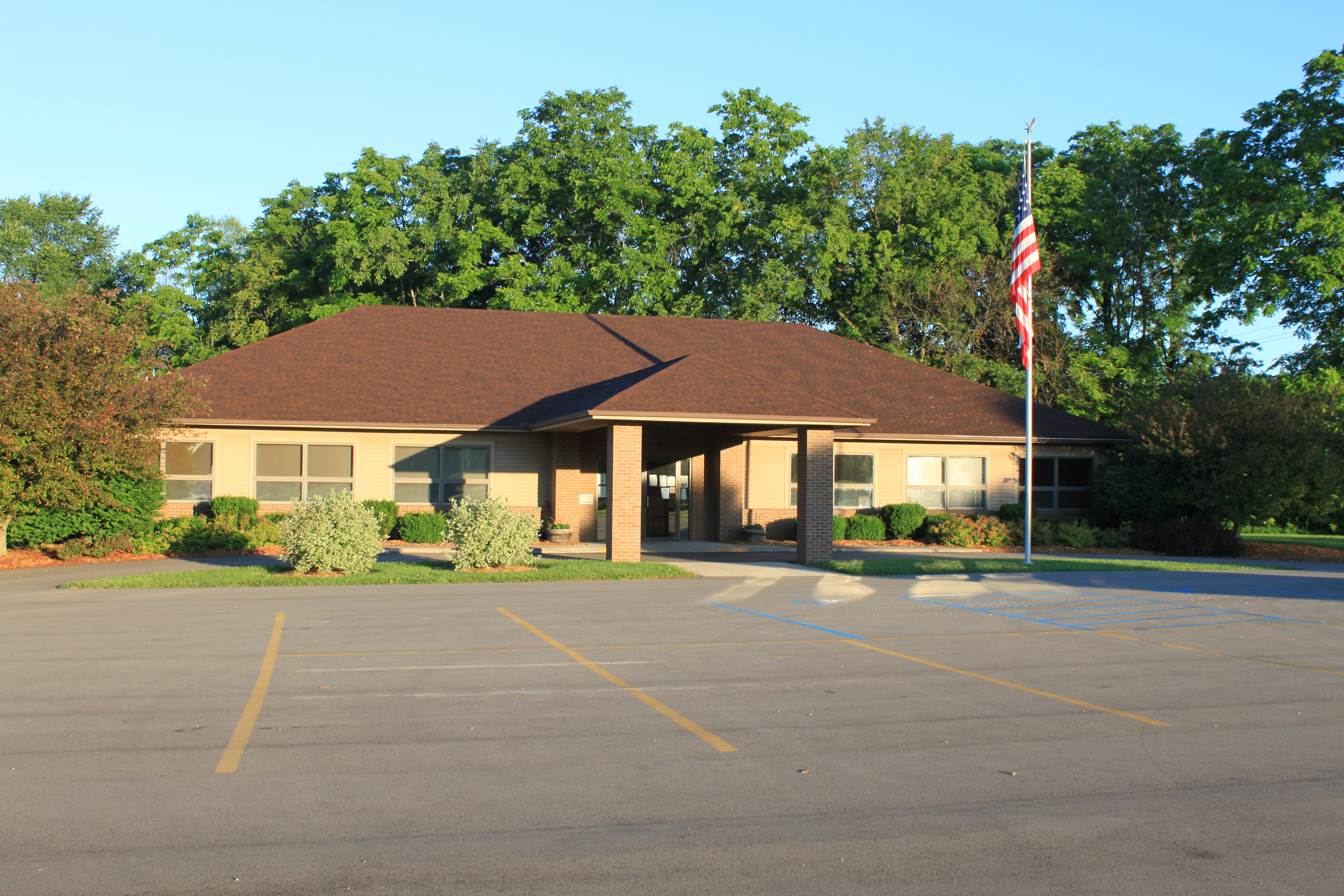
- Township Hall on Pleasant Lake Road
- Motto: Rooted in Agriculture
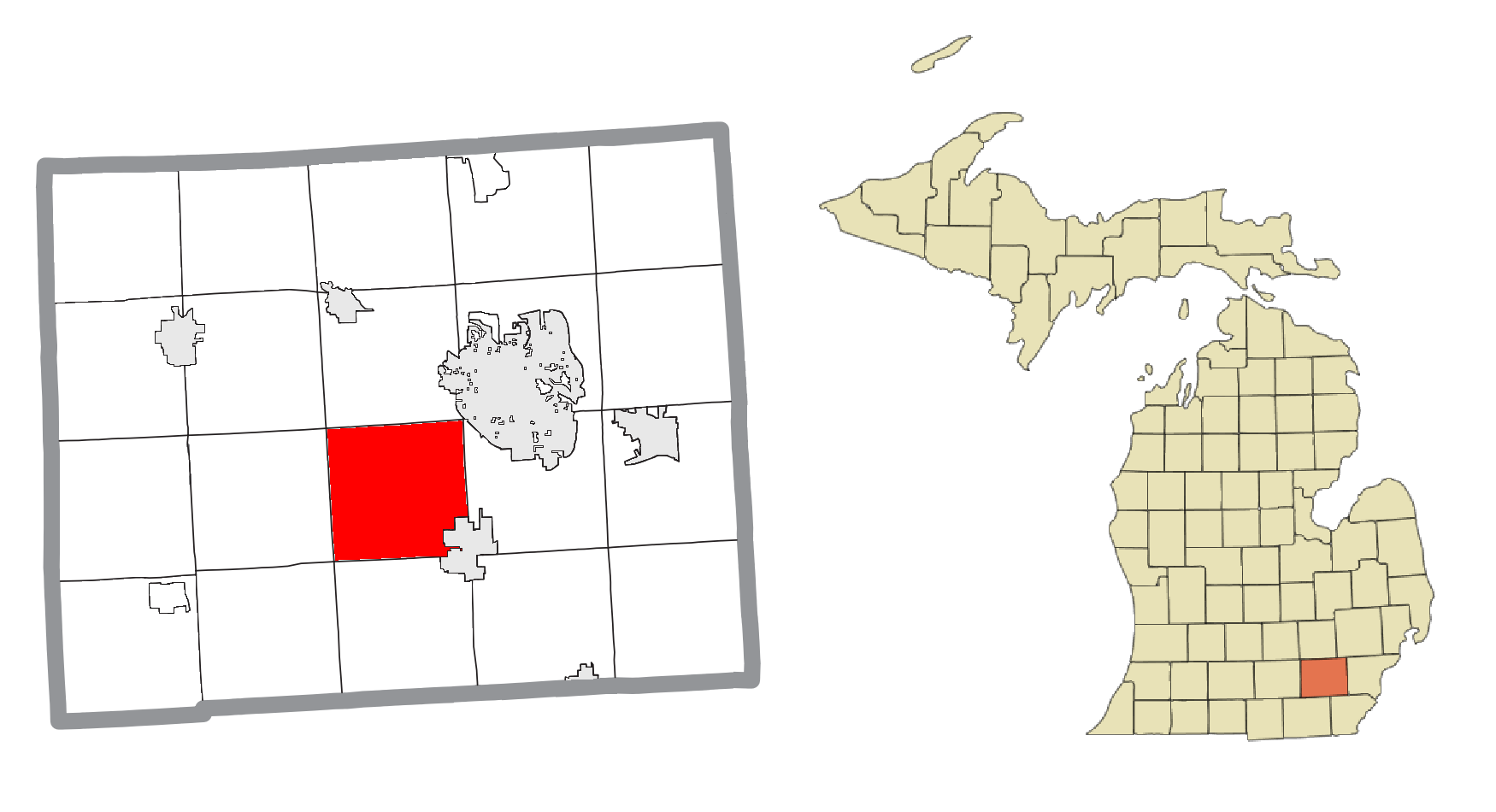
- Location within Washtenaw County

- Location within the state of Michigan Location within the United States
- Coordinates: 42°12′20″N 83°49′04″W
- Country: United States
- State: Michigan
- County: Washtenaw
- Established: 1834

Government
  - Supervisor: Jacob Schaible (Interim)
  - Clerk: Christina Smith

Area
  - Total: 34.45 sq mi (89.23 km^{2})
  - Land: 34.27 sq mi (88.76 km^{2})
  - Water: 0.18 sq mi (0.47 km^{2})
- Elevation: 942 ft (287 m)

Population (2020)
  - Total: 6,417
  - Density: 187.2/sq mi (72.30/km^{2})
- Time zone: UTC-5 (Eastern (EST))
  - Summer (DST): UTC-4 (EDT)
- ZIP code(s): 48103, 48108 (Ann Arbor); 48176 (Saline)
- Area code: 734
- FIPS code: 26-49120
- GNIS feature ID: 1626636
- Website: Official website

Lodi Township is a civil township of Washtenaw County in the U.S. state of Michigan. The population was 6,417 at the 2020 census.

== Communities ==
- Lodi is a historic settlement located within the township. Hugh Crestie made the first land purchase in the area in 1824 in the Michigan Territory. Crestie never settled in the area, while Allen Williams built the first house in 1825. A post office opened on August 29, 1827 and later became the name of the township, which was established in 1834. The community was also known as Lodi Plains and was named after Lodi in the Finger Lakes region of New York, from which many early settlers originated. The post office closed on February 3, 1856.

== Geography ==
According to the U.S. Census Bureau, the township has a total area of 34.45 square miles (89.23 km^{2}), of which 34.27 square miles (88.76 km^{2}) is land and 0.18 square miles (0.47 km^{2}) (0.52%) is water.

The Saline River flows through the township.

== Demographics ==
As of the census of 2000, there were 5,710 people, 1,960 households, and 1,611 families residing in the township. The population density was 169.4 inhabitants per square mile (65.4/km^{2}). There were 2,031 housing units at an average density of 60.2 per square mile (23.2/km^{2}). The racial makeup of the township was 94.24% White, 2.28% African American, 0.32% Native American, 1.40% Asian, 0.05% Pacific Islander, 0.26% from other races, and 1.45% from two or more races. Hispanic or Latino of any race were 1.23% of the population.

There were 1,960 households, out of which 41.8% had children under the age of 18 living with them, 73.9% were married couples living together, 6.0% had a female householder with no husband present, and 17.8% were non-families. 13.4% of all households were made up of individuals, and 4.4% had someone living alone who was 65 years of age or older. The average household size was 2.91 and the average family size was 3.22.

In the township the population was spread out, with 29.4% under the age of 18, 6.0% from 18 to 24, 26.5% from 25 to 44, 29.1% from 45 to 64, and 9.1% who were 65 years of age or older. The median age was 39 years. For every 100 females, there were 97.9 males. For every 100 females age 18 and over, there were 97.2 males.

The median income for a household in the township was $88,419, and the median income for a family was $96,233. Males had a median income of $68,667 versus $39,722 for females. The per capita income for the township was $37,516. About 2.8% of families and 3.3% of the population were below the poverty line, including 4.1% of those under age 18 and 4.4% of those age 65 or over.

== Education ==
Lodi Township is served by three separate public school districts. The majority of the township is served by Saline Area Schools. The northeast corner of the township is served by Ann Arbor Public Schools, and a very small portion of the northwest corner is served by Dexter Community School District.

== Notable people ==
- Orrin Howe (1786–1848), first Speaker Pro Tempore of the Michigan House of Representatives

== Images ==
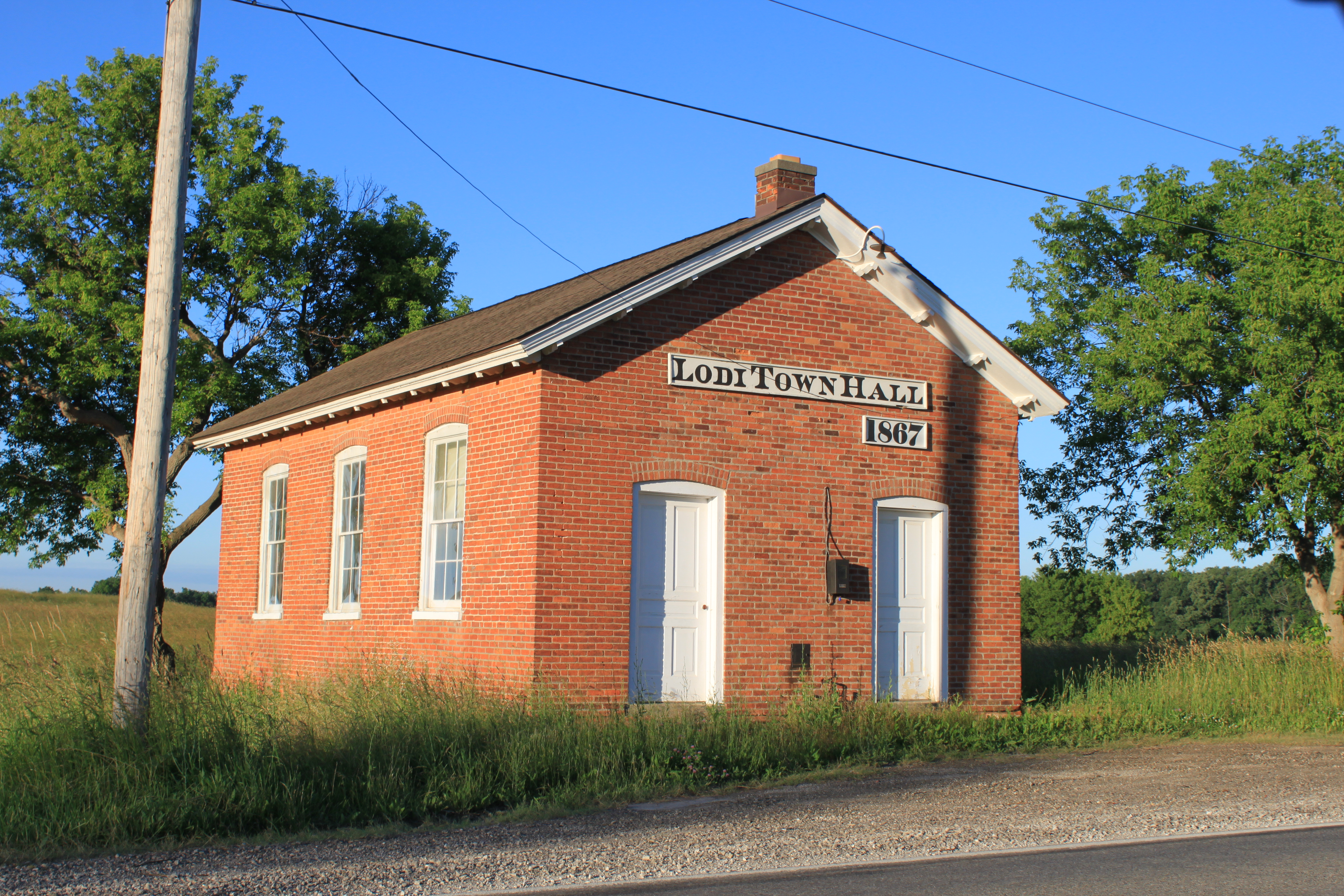
Old Town Hall on Pleasant Lake Road

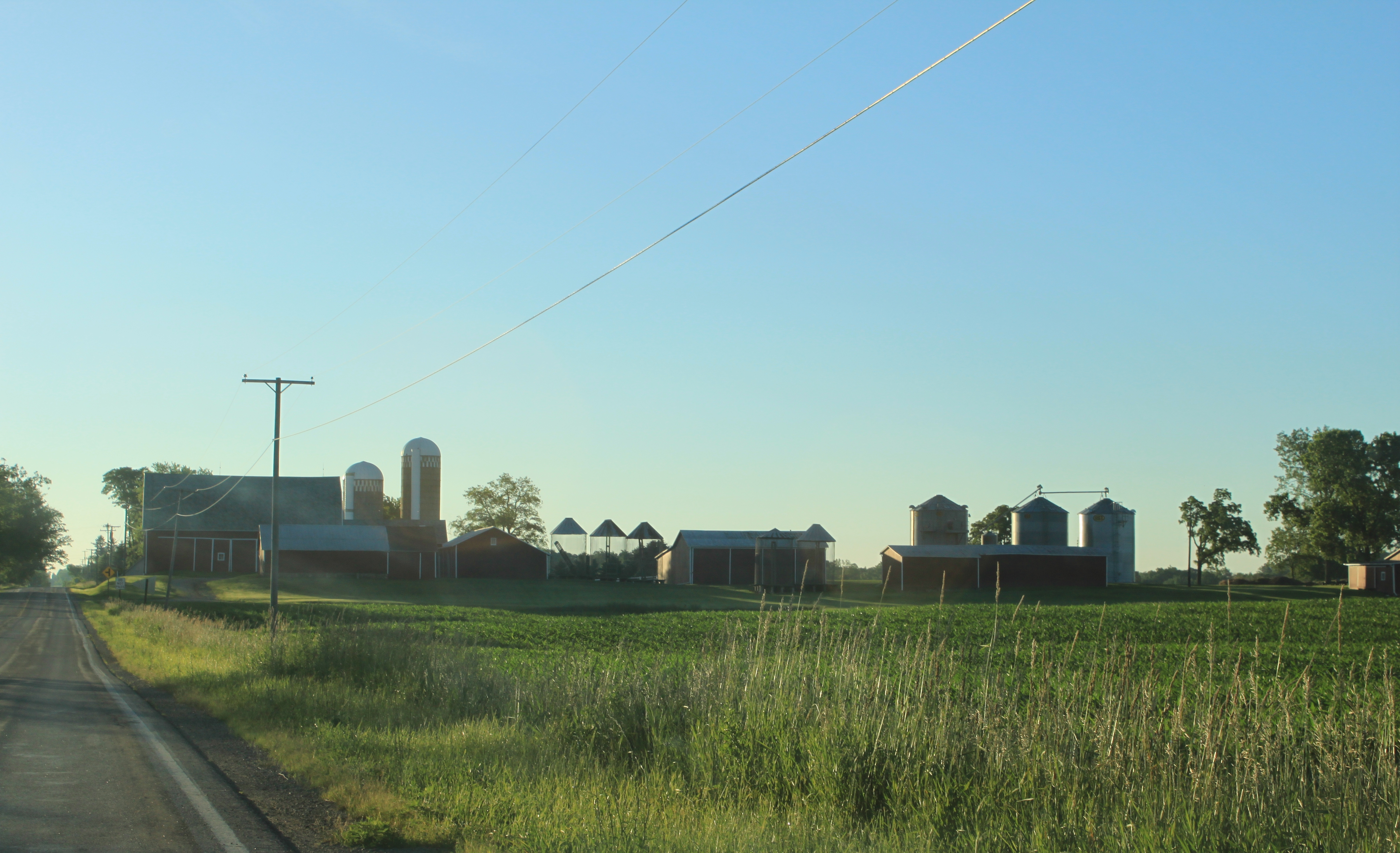
Schaible Farm on Pleasant Lake Road

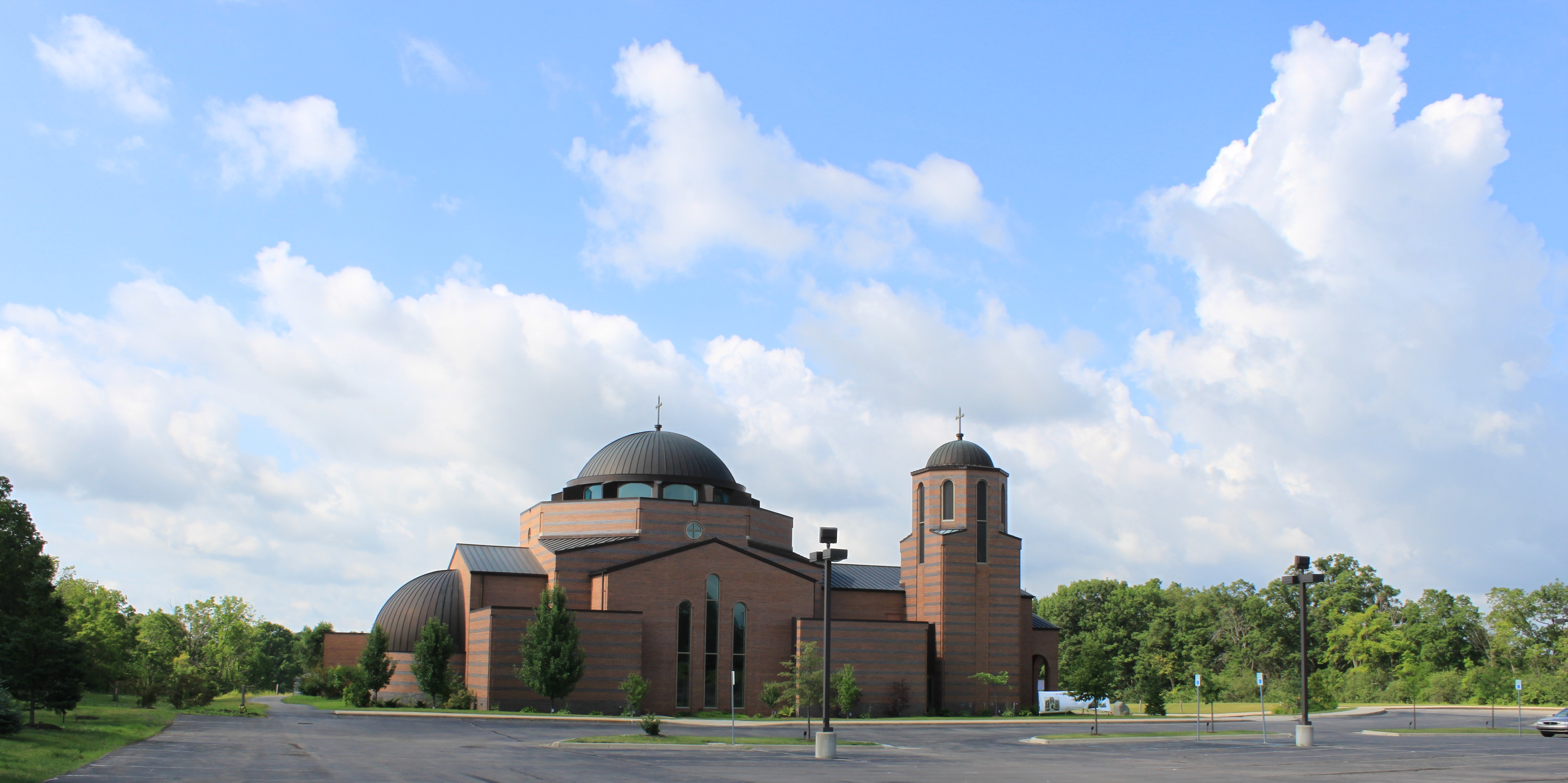
Saint Nicholas Greek Orthodox Church
