= Lodi, Texas =

Unincorporated community in Marion County, Texas, United States

Lodi
- Unincorporated community
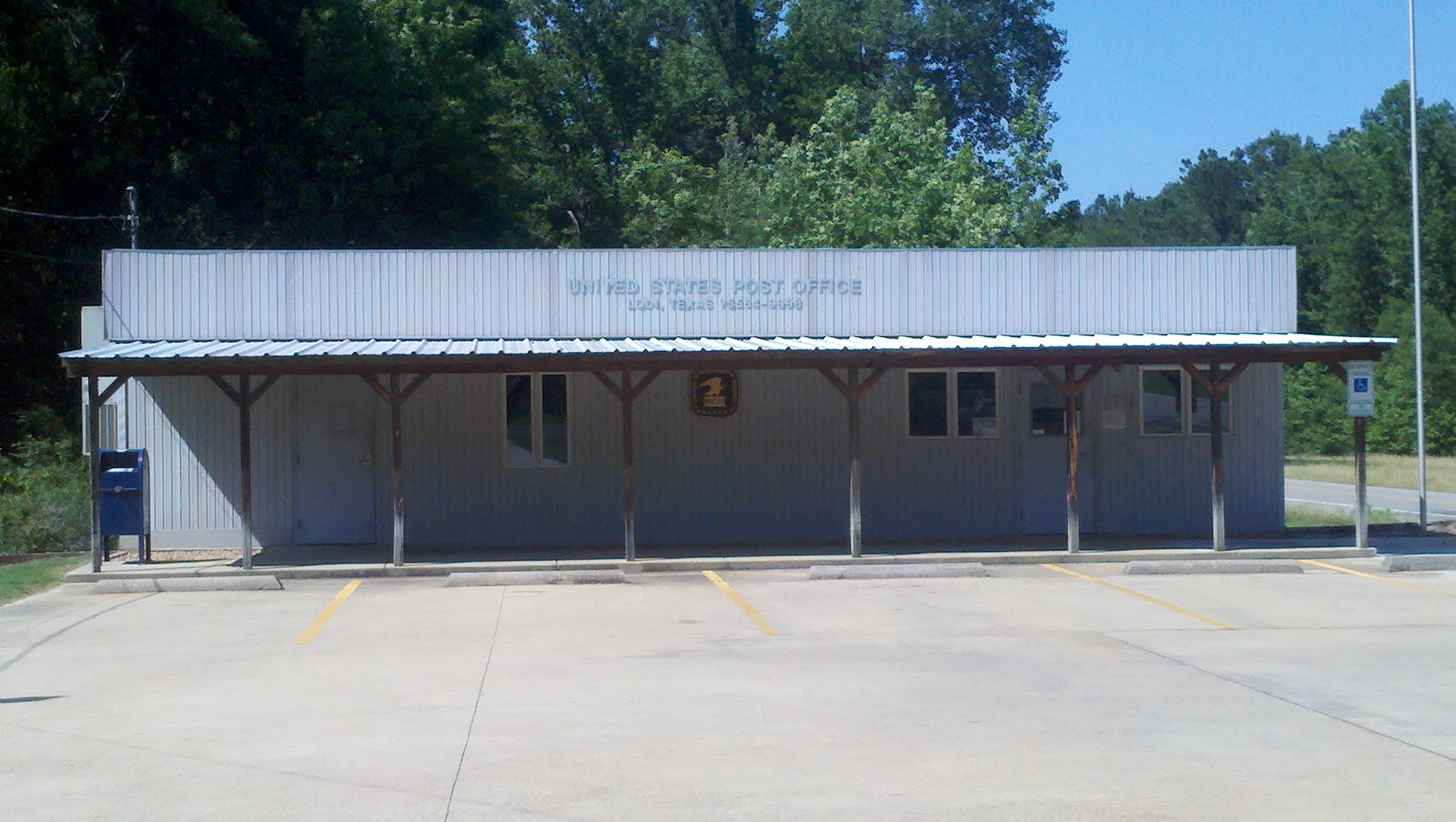
- Lodi Post Office, May 2011

- Location within the state of Texas Lodi (the United States)
- Coordinates: 32°52′28″N 94°16′48″W
- Country: United States
- State: Texas
- County: Marion
- Elevation: 253 ft (77 m)
- Time zone: UTC-6 (Central (CST))
  - Summer (DST): UTC-5 (CDT)
- ZIP codes: 75564
- Area codes: 903, 430
- GNIS feature ID: 1378592

Lodi is an unincorporated community in northern Marion County, Texas, United States. Its elevation is 253 feet (77 m). It has a post office with the ZIP code 75564. The only business in Lodi, Texas is Lodi Drilling & Service Company Inc.

The settlement is named for Lodi, Italy.

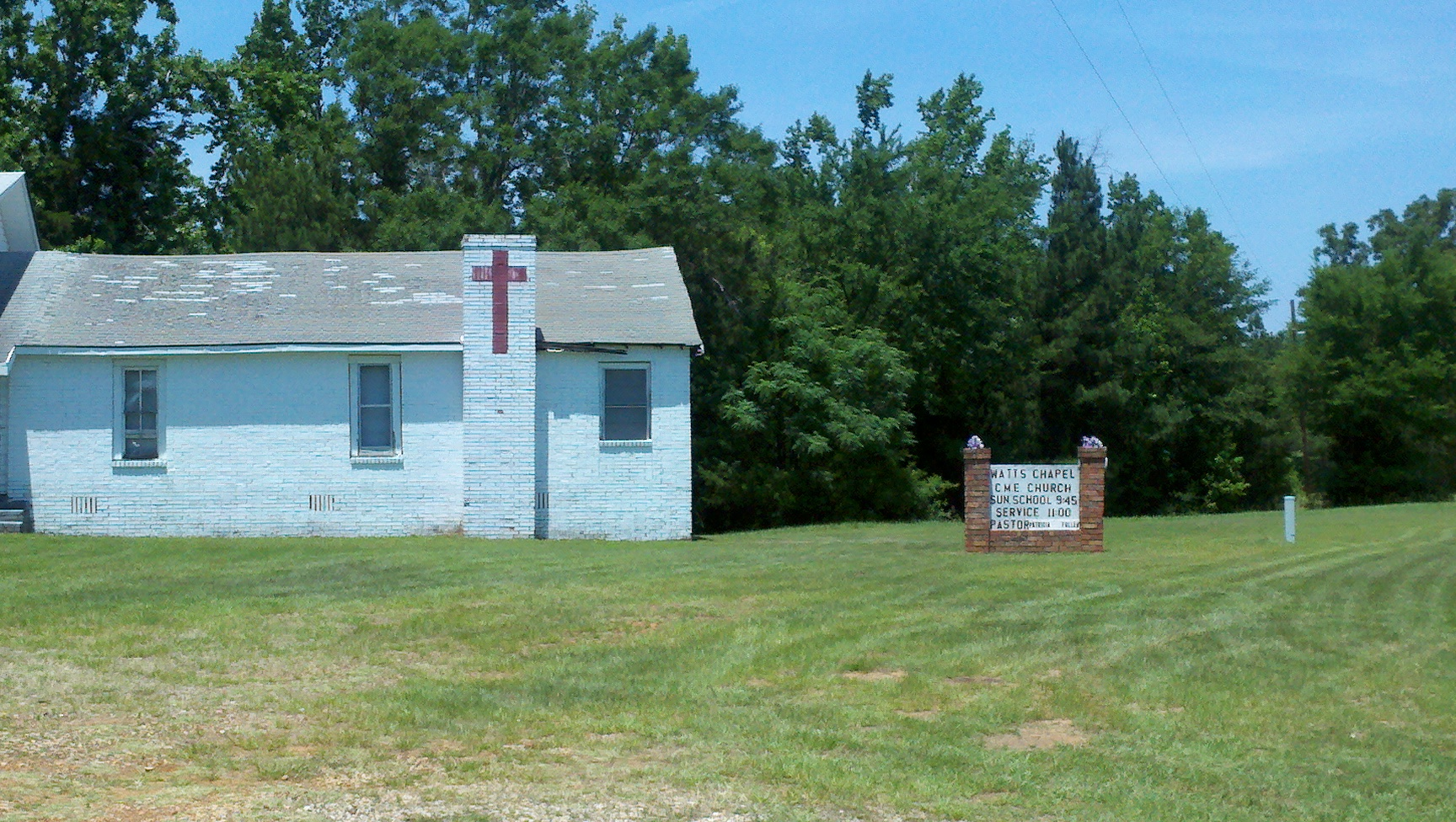
Methodist church in Lodi, May 2011
