= 2023 Bethel Springs–Adamsville tornado =

2023 EF3 tornado in Tennessee, USA

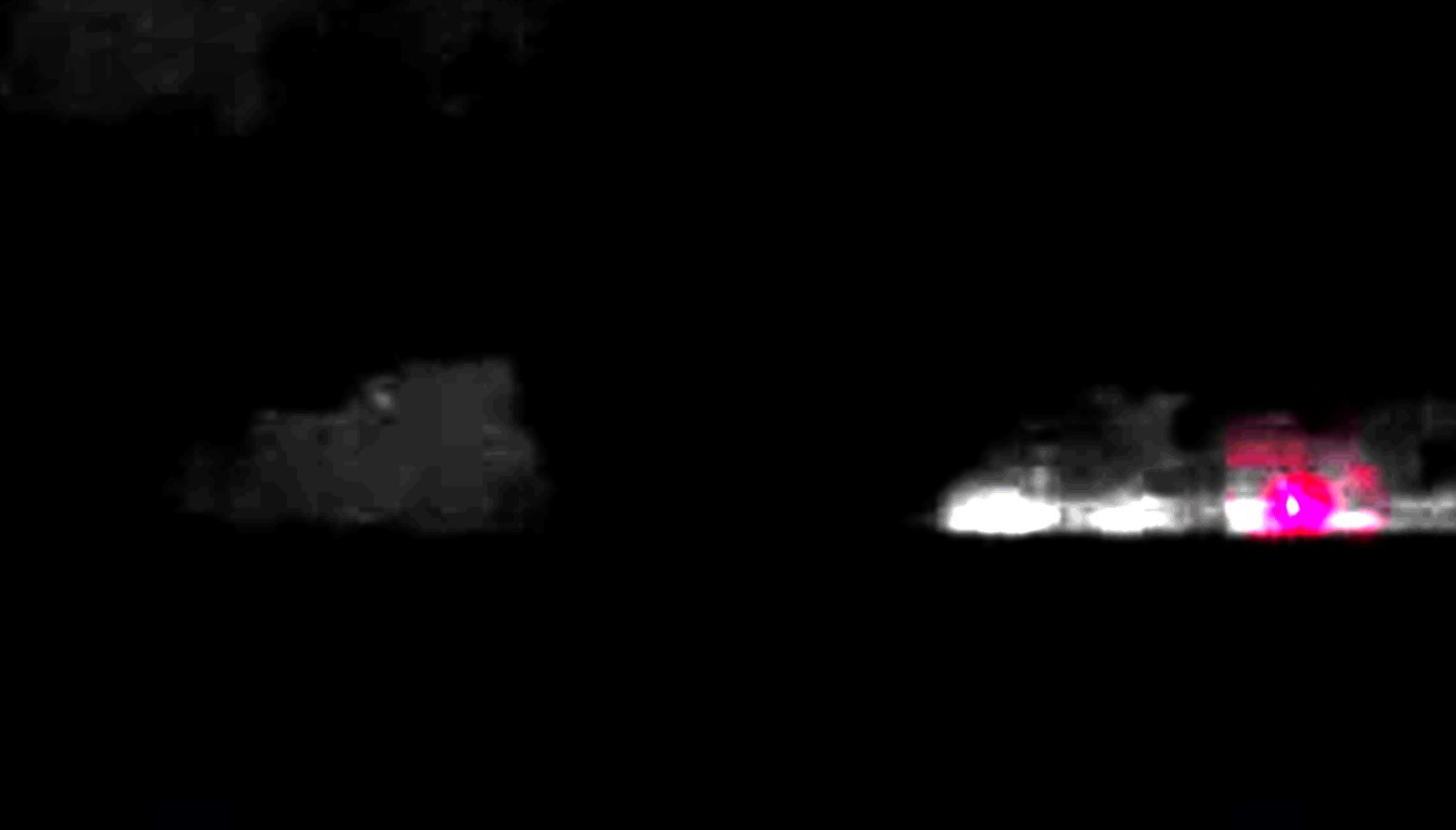
- The tornado as it tracked through areas south of Clifton.

Meteorological history
- Formed: March 31, 2023, 11:04 p.m. CDT (UTC−05:00)
- Dissipated: April 1, 2023, 12:37 a.m. CDT (UTC−05:00)
- Duration: 1 hour, 33 minutes

EF3 tornado
- on the Enhanced Fujita scale
- Max width: 1,400 yards (0.80 mi; 1.3 km)
- Path length: 86.01 miles (138.42 km)
- Highest winds: 155 mph (249 km/h)

Overall effects
- Casualties: 9 fatalities, 23 injuries
- Damage: $25.475 million (2023 USD)
- Areas affected: Southern Tennessee, especially McNairy County and Hardin County
- Part of the Tornado outbreak of March 31 – April 1, 2023 and Tornadoes of 2023

During the late hours of Friday, March 31, into the midnight hours of Saturday, April 1, 2023, a large, strong, and deadly tornado moved through parts of southern Tennessee, causing severe damage in multiple counties, namely McNairy and Hardin. The tornado was on the ground for 1 hour and 33 minutes, killing 9 people and injuring a further 23 along an 85.90 mile (138.24 km) path. The tornado produced damage that was rated mid-range EF3 by the National Weather Service in Memphis, Tennessee, and low-end EF3 by the National Weather Service in Nashville, Tennessee, causing $25.475 million (2023 USD) in damages overall. It was part of a larger tornado outbreak spanning from March 31 into April 1, 2023 that produced 145 tornadoes in total across the Midwestern, Southern, and Eastern United States.

The tornado began in Hardeman County, causing minor tree and structural damage before entering McNairy County. There, the tornado intensified as it followed Rose Creek Road, causing damage to trees and wood poles and blowing away a manufactured home at EF2 strength, killing four. Continuing to the east-northeast, the tornado passed to the northwest of Selmer, causing damage to a church, then through Bethel Springs, where a separate tornado had already struck prior, causing severe damage to several homes. In Purdy, the tornado briefly attained EF3 strength as it destroyed a community center and damaged multiple other homes in the area. To the northeast, the tornado peaked in intensity along Old Stage Road, sweeping away two homes, damaging many others, and killing four people in the area at mid-range EF3 strength. As it struck the northern outskirts of Adamsville, it severely damaged and blew away mobile homes, killing one, before weakening and entering Hardin County, where it caused another isolated area of EF3 damage before crossing the Tennessee River three times. The tornado continued to cause widespread tree damage and sporadic structural damage until it entered Wayne County and impacted Leatherwood at high-end EF2 strength, weakening shortly thereafter and continuing into rural areas of Lewis County, dissipating to the southeast of Mount Pleasant after being on the ground for 1½ hours along an 85 mile (138 km) path.

During the midnight hours of April 3, 2025, just days after the anniversary of the 2023 tornado, an even stronger high-end EF3 tornado devastated areas just to the south of and directly in its path, resulting in 5 fatalities, 14 injuries, and catastrophic damage to multiple areas, most notably on the north side of Selmer, marking the second time in two years that a severe tornado had devastated McNairy County.

== Meteorological synopsis ==
=== March 27–30 ===
As another devastating tornado outbreak was taking place across parts of the Southern United States on March 27, the Storm Prediction Center in Norman, Oklahoma outlined a large 15% contour for severe weather across much of the Mid/Lower Mississippi Valley, expecting increasingly favorable conditions to support severe weather. By March 29, an enhanced risk was outlined for parts of Wisconsin, Iowa, Illinois, Missouri, Kentucky, Tennessee, Arkansas, Mississippi, and Alabama. In this region, a powerful mid to upper level trough was expected to eject and enter an area with an atmosphere containing high moisture levels, due to the moderate dew points across the area, and elevated low and high level jet streams. This created an environment supportive of the development of a fast-moving, strong squall line, and discrete supercell thunderstorms capable of producing damaging winds, large hail, and tornadoes.

By March 30, two moderate risks had been issued in the northern and southern halves of the larger enhanced risk alongside a 15% tornado probability, with conditions in these areas expected to produce intense, damaging wind gusts and strong, long-tracked tornadoes as rising CAPE values, high wind shear, and strong helicity became prevalent in the region, creating more instability to support supercell thunderstorms. The northernmost risk encompassed areas between southeastern Iowa and northwestern Illinois, and the southern between northeastern Arkansas, the Missouri Bootheel, far southwestern Kentucky, western Tennessee, and far northwestern Mississippi, situated along the Mississippi River.

=== March 31 ===
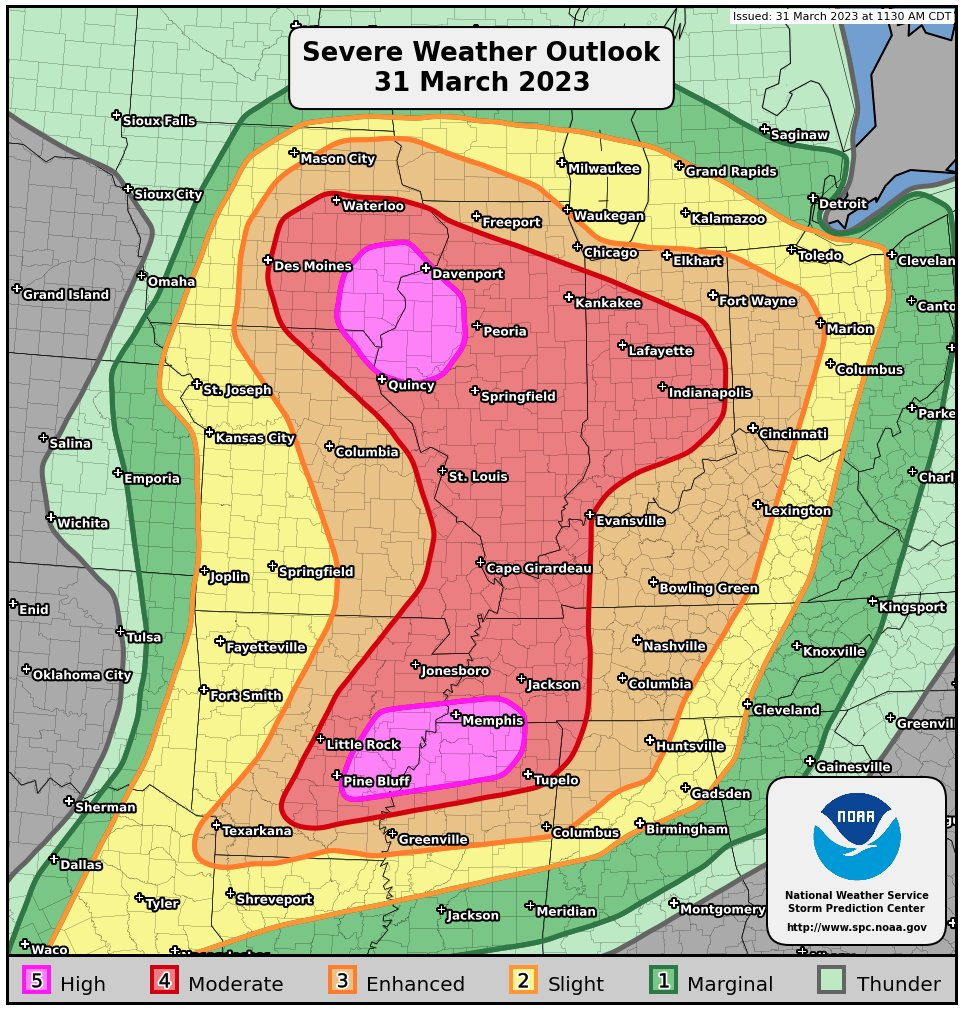
16:30 UTC outlook for March 31, 2023.

On the morning of March 31, an extratropical cyclone formed over Nebraska, prompting meteorologists to expect a storm mode of discrete supercells to develop. As CAPE values continued to rise and the environment became increasingly unstable, the Storm Prediction Center bridged the two moderate risks into one large area in their 1300 UTC outlook, which included parts of Iowa, Illinois, Indiana, Kentucky, Missouri, Tennessee, Alabama, Mississippi, and Arkansas. Portions of Kentucky and Tennessee, far southwestern Indiana, and northwestern Alabama, were outlined in a 10% hatched risk for tornadoes. A larger 30% partially hatched contour for damaging wind gusts, with a smaller 45% risk situated in the northern half of the risk, and large hail were also outlined in the outlook.

At the 16:30 UTC outlook, the tornado threat was upgraded even further, outlining two tornado-driven high risk areas on the northern and southern sides of the risk, one encompassing southeastern Iowa, western Illinois, and far northwestern Missouri, and the other eastern Arkansas, far southwestern Tennessee, and northwestern Mississippi. These high risks were accompanied by a 30% hatched tornado risk, as an extremely unstable environment favored the development of discrete supercells with the possibility of producing strong to violent tornadoes expected to transition into strong straight-line wind and tornado producing QLCS systems later into the evening. Multiple PDS tornado watches were issued not long after the high risk upgrade, and isolated discrete supercells began to develop across parts of Arkansas and Missouri shortly thereafter. Later into the day, after multiple significant tornadoes had already formed, another PDS tornado watch was issued for parts of northwestern Alabama, northern Mississippi, and West and Middle Tennessee, in preparation of isolated tornado producing supercells approaching the area, and where more tornadic supercells were expected to form. That night, another isolated supercell formed and tracked through the same areas where a prior supercell had just produced weak to strong tornadoes, eventually producing the long-track EF3 tornado that impacted McNairy County.

== Tornado summary ==
=== Formation in Hardeman County & track in McNairy County ===
The tornado initially developed at 11:04 p.m. CDT (UTC-05:00) on March 31, 3.8 miles (6.1 km) southeast of Serles and 4.8 miles (7.7 km) south of Hornsby in Hardeman County, just to the west of the Hardeman-McNairy County border. Moving east-northeastwards, the tornado immediately intensified to mid-range—high-end EF1 strength, snapping and uprooting trees as it crossed over the intersection of Powell Chapel and Skipper Creek Roads. The tornado then crossed Skipper Creek Road for a second time, causing additional tree damage and minor structural damage before entering McNairy County.

In McNairy County, the tornado moved along Skipper Creek, uprooting and snapping trees in a large swath of EF1 damage. As the tornado followed Rose Creek Road, it snapped a few wood poles, leaving one leaning to the side among a pile of uprooted trees. The tornado intensified further and briefly gained EF2 strength as it crossed over Cypress Creek, causing widespread significant tree damage, blowing down power poles, and obliterating a poorly anchored single wide manufactured home in which four occupants were killed, becoming the first fatalities of the tornado. All four people had just moved into the area leading up to the storm, and two arrived the day of. Many other houses in the area also sustained damage. The tornado briefly weakened back to EF1 strength before passing through Rose Creek. While its core containing the strongest winds passed just to the north, the area was still struck by the outer circulation of the tornado. The tornado maintained high-end EF1 strength as it approached and crossed US 64/SR 15 to the northwest of Selmer, along which more houses were “completely destroyed”, and widespread tree damage was observed, including some uprooted. Passing over John Moore Road, the tornado intensified back to EF2 strength, which it maintained as it crossed US 45/SR 5. Here, utility poles and large trees were snapped, and a church had its foyer windows blown out, with surveyors observing additional damage to its siding. A metal building just to the north was completely destroyed, and many other homes in the area sustained lesser damage. Continuing at EF2 strength, the tornado moved through the southern side of Bethel Springs, flipping or moving multiple vehicles including a semi truck, causing major tree damage, and severely damaging multiple houses, shifting one off of its foundation as it crossed Main Street. This area of the path had also been struck by a low-end EF2 tornado just two hours earlier, and multiple properties damaged in the first tornado were hit again by the second.

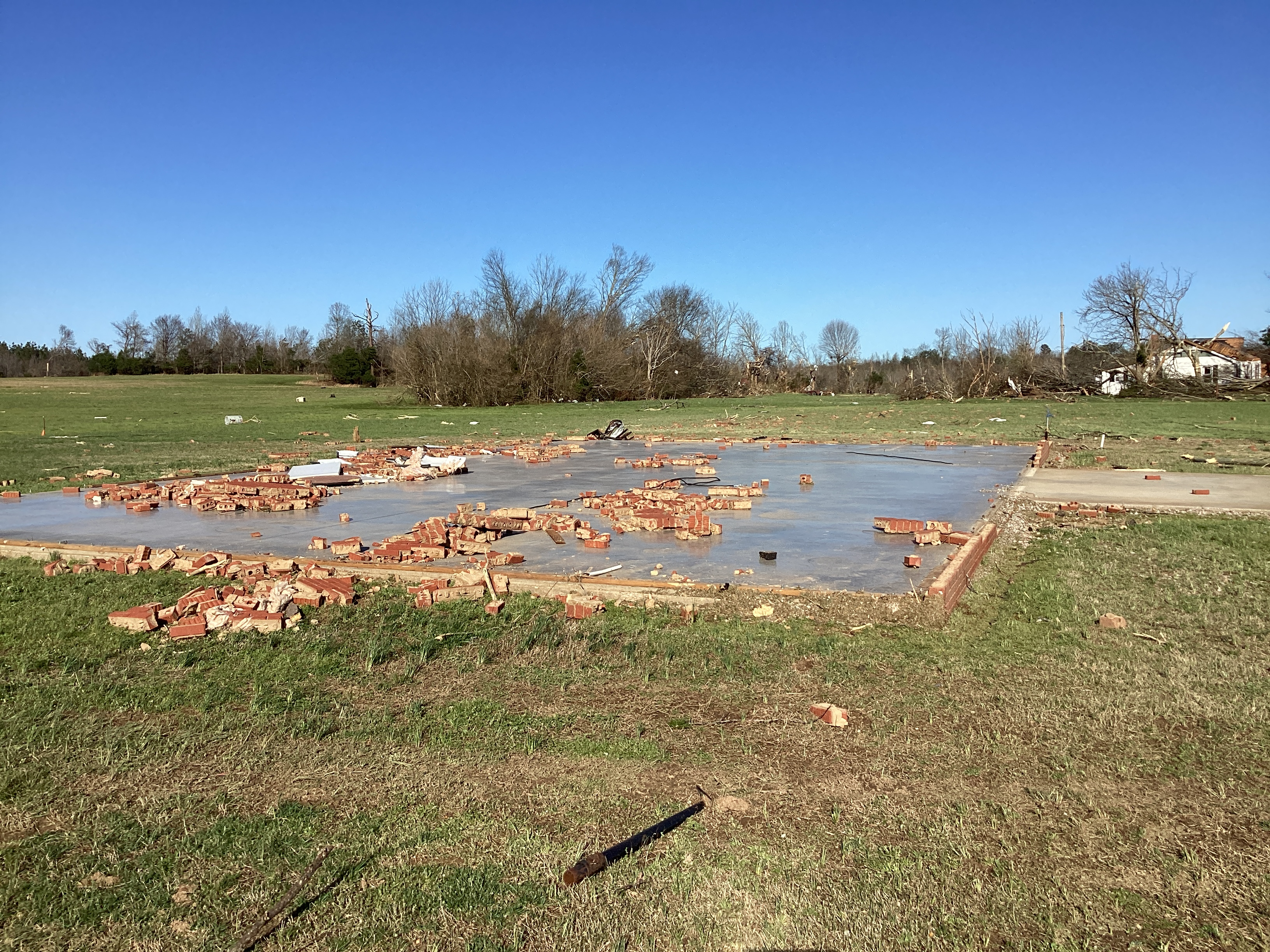
The Purdy Community Center after the tornado.

Crossing Cypress Creek for a second time as it left Bethel Springs, the tornado briefly weakened back to EF1 strength, causing additional damage to trees and power poles, then crossed Sandy Creek before reintensifying to high-end EF2 strength along Bethel-Purdy Road. Here, multiple manufactured homes were obliterated, of which some had their metal frames wrapped around trees, and nearby frame homes suffered severe damage including the loss of roofs and exterior walls. Entering the community of Purdy just to the northeast, the tornado crossed Hurst Lane, intensifying further to low-end EF3 strength, then struck the Purdy Community Center along Purdy-Beauty Hill Road with winds up to 145 mph (233 km/h), destroying the building so badly that only its concrete slab foundation was left, swept almost completely clean. Nearby houses sustained severe damage, and asphalt was scoured from the road in the area.

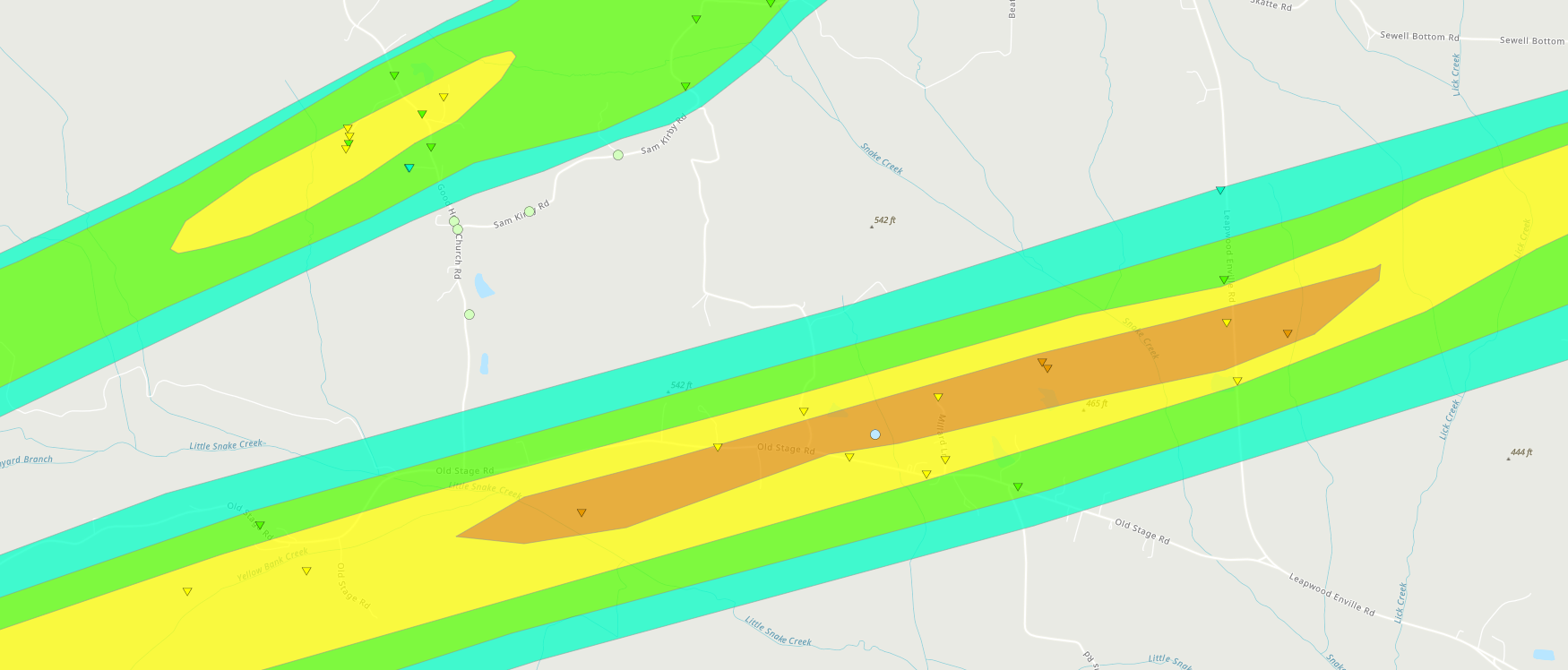
Track and intensity map of the tornado along Old Stage Road. The path of the prior EF2 tornado can be seen at top left. Key EF0 65–85 mph EF1 86–110 mph EF2 111–135 mph EF3 136–165 mph

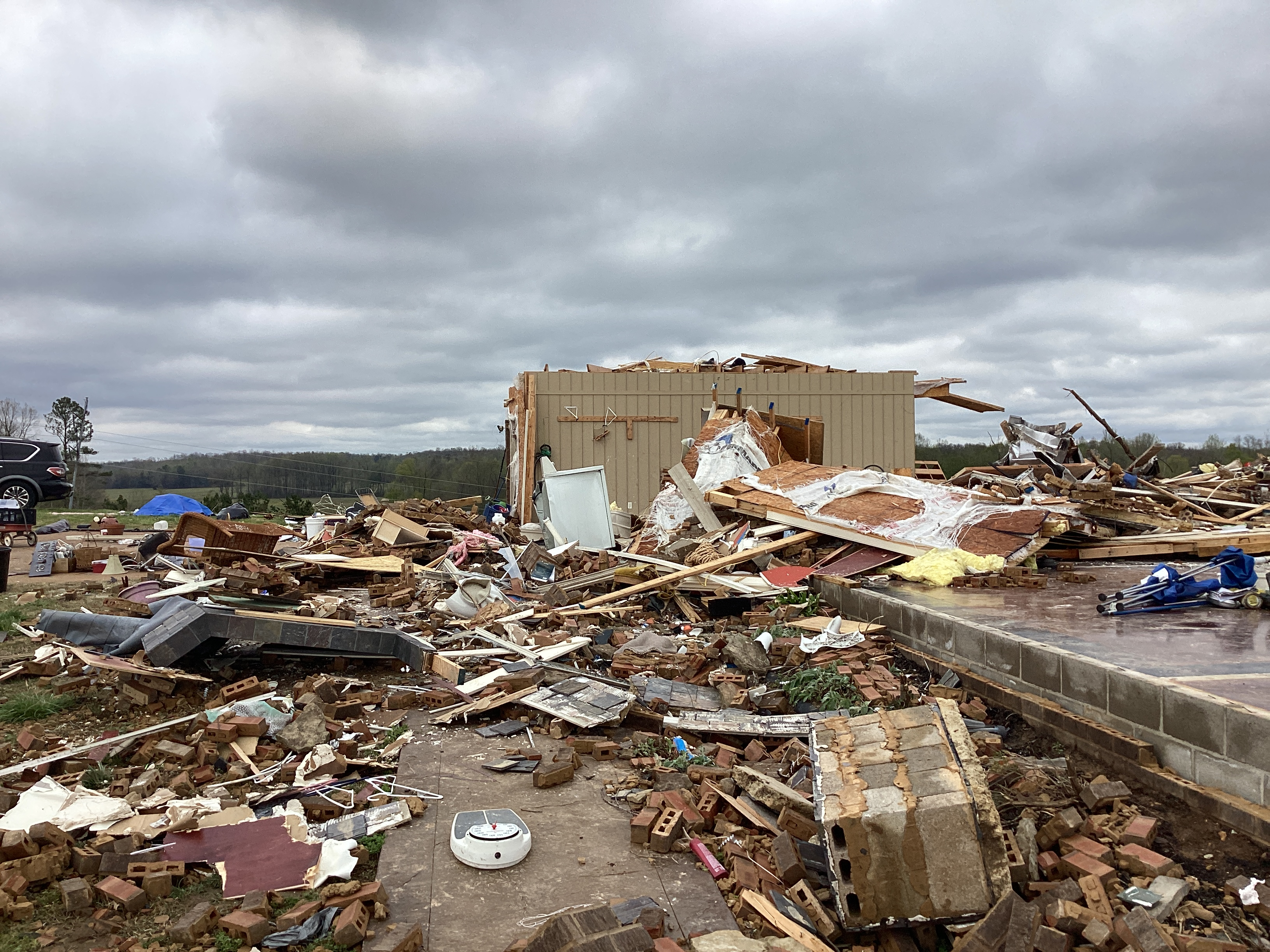
A destroyed house with its inner walls left standing from winds of 155 mph (249 km/h) along Old Stage Road.

The tornado weakened back to EF2 strength as it exited Purdy, continuing to cause widespread tree damage and sporadic damage to structures before intensifying once again to mid-range EF3 strength southeast of Good Hope, reaching its peak intensity with winds up to 155 mph (249 km/h). The tornado first bent metal poles to the ground and snapped every tree in a grove, then struck several houses, many of which lost their roofs and exterior walls. Two houses, one large but poorly anchored, and the other a block-foundation home, were completely swept away, and a semi-trailer was tossed. Four more people were killed in this area, two each at an unsurveyed site along Old Stage Road and a manufactured home on Millard Lane just to the northeast of the aforementioned location. The tornado then crossed Leapwood-Earville Road/SR 224, causing major tree damage and bending more metal poles, to the ground in some cases, before weakening back to EF2 strength and crossing over Lick Creek. Damage to trees and more isolated damage to structures continued along Puron Road and Neely Sharp Road before the tornado intensified once again to low-end EF3 strength with winds of 140 mph (225 km/h) as it passed through the northern outskirts of Adamsville. Crossing the intersection of Winding Ridge Road and SR 22, the tornado obliterated a manufactured home, killing one. Multiple other houses in the area had their roofs and exterior walls collapse, and a free-standing tower collapsed completely. The tornado weakened back to EF2 strength after crossing Daniel Lane, then further to EF1 strength as it entered Hardin County.

=== Hardin County & track until dissipation in Lewis County ===
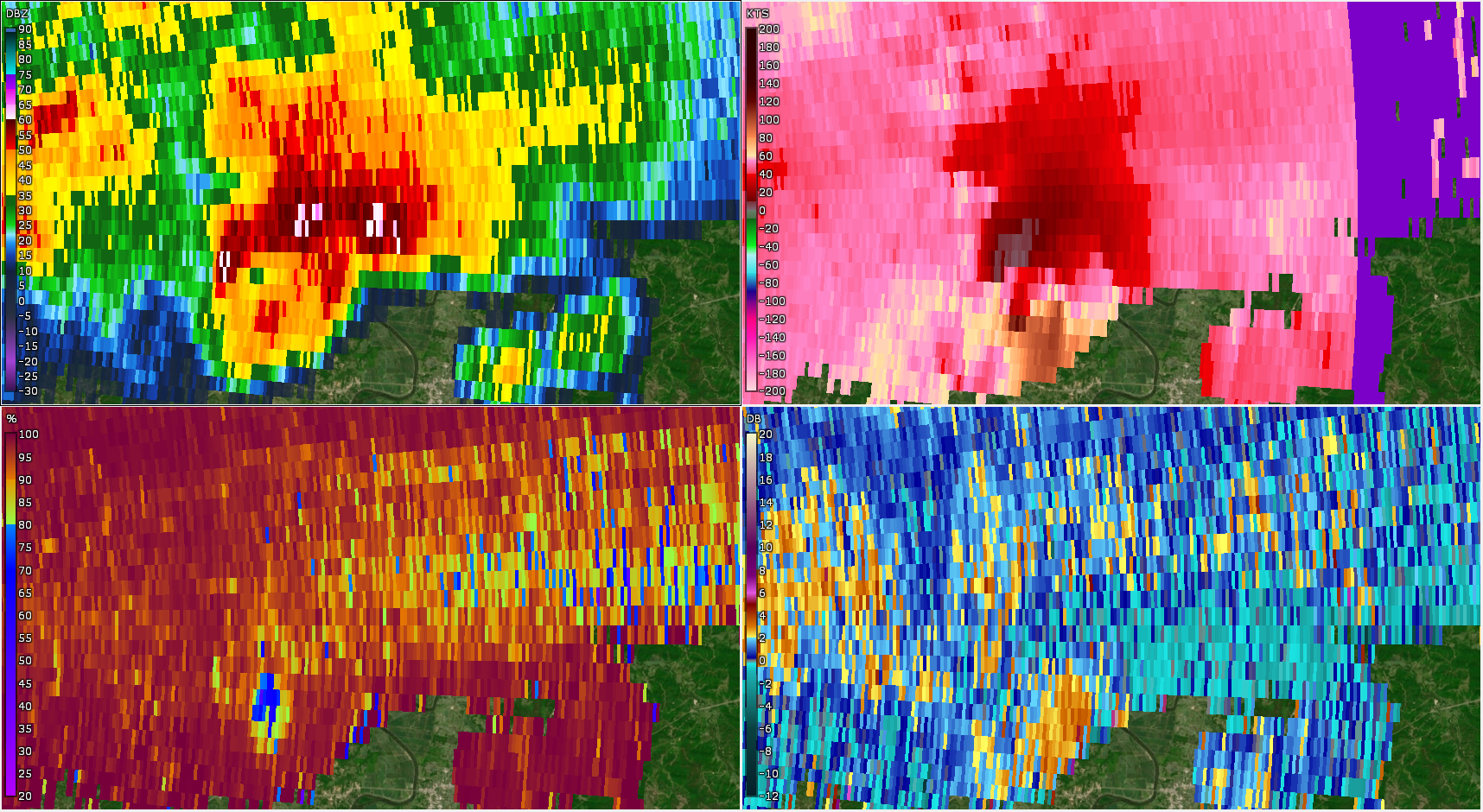
NEXRAD radar imagery of the Bethel Springs tornado shortly after entering Hardin County, crossing the Tennessee River.

In Hardin County, the tornado caused tree and structural damage along SR 69, then briefly intensified to EF2 strength as it snapped trees along Old Union Road and Harris Road. The tornado weakened back to EF1 strength shortly thereafter, uprooting trees, snapping wood poles, and causing structural damage. Following Glendale Road, the tornado rapidly intensified to low-end EF3 strength as it crossed over the Tennessee River, removing the roof and exterior walls of one house, and snapping and partially debarking multiple hardwood trees with winds up to 145 mph (233 km/h). Weakening back to EF2 strength, it compromised the block foundation of another house, allowing the winds to blow under the house and lift it from the bottom, blowing it away and flipping it onto its roof. The tornado then snapped more trees before weakening further to EF1 strength as it crossed the Tennessee River for the second time north of Oak Grove. The tornado reintensified and produced a pocket of EF2 damage along Lee Lane/Clover Drive, removing parts of the roof from two homes and snapping wood poles, then weakened back to EF1 strength, crossing the Tennessee River for a third and final time north of Cerro Gordo. Continuing east-northeastwards, the tornado moved through New Harmony, completely destroying an outbuilding and damaging multiple other houses. Passing through the Crossroads area and crossing Poplar Springs Road, the tornado intensified once again, snapping trees at mid-range EF2 strength. Another house slid off its block foundation on Hardin Creek Road, sustaining severe siding and window damage. The tornado maintained EF2 strength as it turned towards the northeast and entered Wayne County.

In Wayne County, the tornado crossed US 641/SR 114 to the south of Clifton. Along Tom Holt Road and surrounding areas, trees were snapped, outbuildings were heavily damaged or destroyed outright, and multiple houses sustained varying degrees of damage to their roofs, with some having them partially ripped off. As the tornado passed through the area, a news station was covering the tornado on live television, and the Arctic Air Skycam captured some of the only footage of the large wedge tornado between flashes of lightning. The tornado turned to the east-northeast, intensifying further to high-end EF2 strength as it struck Leatherwood along SR 228. Multiple trees were snapped or uprooted, and one single wide manufactured home had its roof and walls completely removed. Debris was blown downstream, including a refrigerator that was thrown up Old Union Church Road. Another small house was blown off its block and dirt foundation and completely destroyed, although drone photos revealed that it was not anchored. Multiple other houses were severely damaged or destroyed along Beech Creek Road, and two people were injured in the area, one of which had to be airlifted to the hospital. The tornado weakened back to EF1 strength, passing through rural areas of Wayne County. The tornado then crossed TN 13 north of Waynesboro, snapping and uprooting trees near the communities of Topsy and Ashland before the crossing into Lewis County, continuing to snap hundreds of trees. The tornado weakened further to EF0 strength after crossing Natchez Trace Parkway, snapping away large branches before dissipating along Tiger Bennet Road to the west-southwest of Mount Pleasant at 12:37 a.m. CDT (UTC-05:00) on April 1.

== Aftermath ==
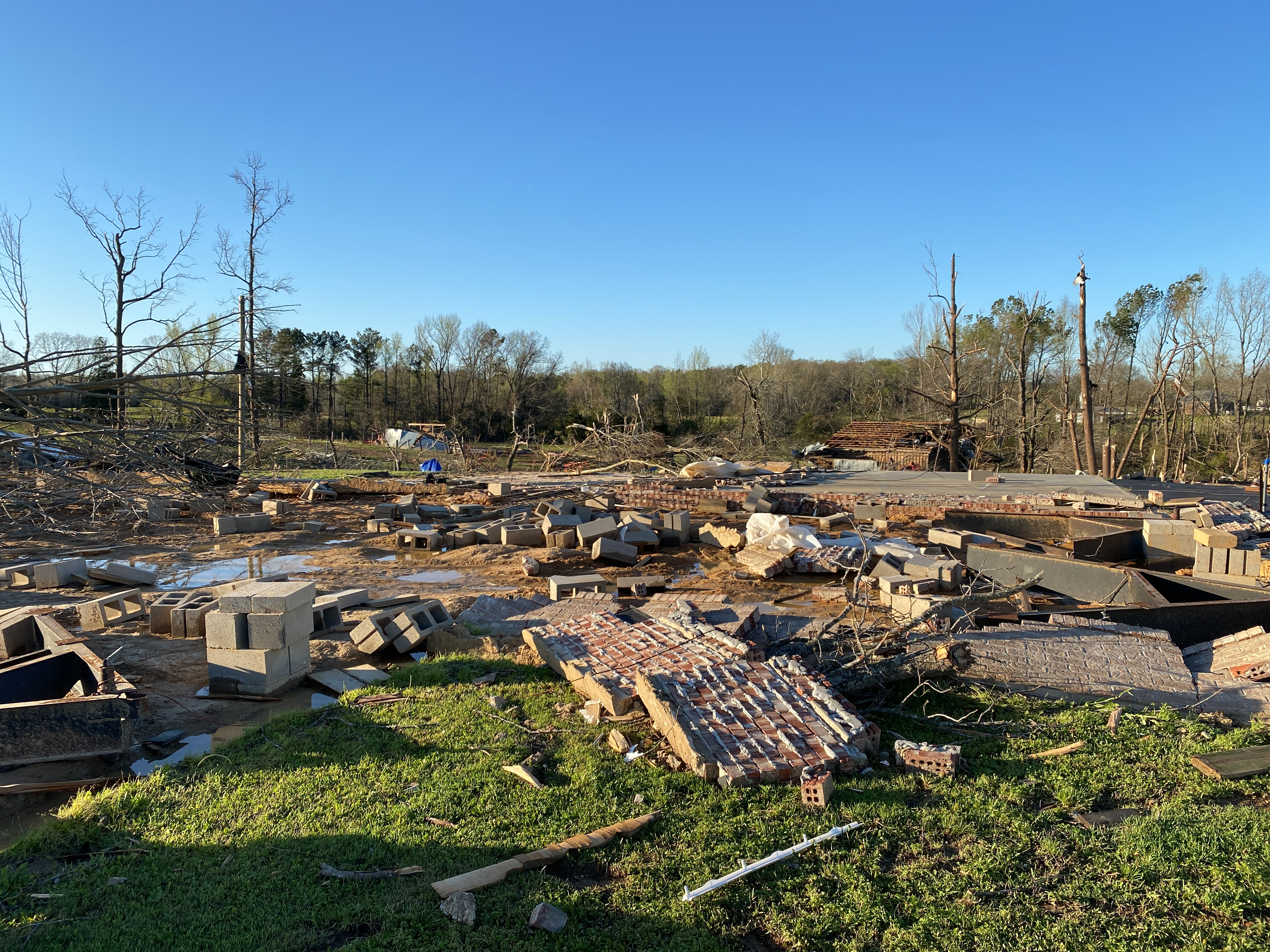
An obliterated mobile home in Adamsville. One person was killed here.

=== Damage & recovery efforts ===
Following the tornado, public aid and individual aid from FEMA was administered to McNairy County and nine other Tennessee counties including Tipton County, which was hit by another mid-range EF3 tornado. Donations such as hygiene products, canned goods, and water were given to tornado survivors in Adamsville City Hall, and the American Red Cross opened a shelter in Selmer. The National Weather Service claimed that around 200 structures sustained damage in McNairy County, of which 91 were described as total losses. However, ABC 24 in Memphis, Tennessee claimed that 300 structures sustained damage, of which 100 were described as completely destroyed following the tornadoes. In total, 40% of the county sustained damage from the storms. In Hardin County, 150 more structures were damaged by this tornado alone, of which 42 were total losses.The tornado was on the ground for 1 hour and 33 minutes over an 85.90 mile (138.24 km) path, reaching a peak width of 1,400 yards (1,300 m). In total, it caused $25.475 million in damages.

A paper phone bill from Wayne County was found in a yard 101 miles away (163 km) away in Wilson County, and a paper check from Adamsville was found at an even further distance of 122 miles (196 km) away in Franklin.

=== Casualties ===
Nine people were killed, all in McNairy County, making it not only the longest tracked but the deadliest tornado of the entire outbreak, and the second deadliest tornado of 2023 only behind the Rolling Fork-Silver City, Mississippi tornado just one week prior. The death toll initially sat at a lesser seven, but had been raised to nine by the evening of April 1. 23 other people were injured by the tornado, with 21 of those injuries in McNairy County alone.

Name	Location of death	County	Area	Refs.
Maria Avila	Mobile home	McNairy	Rose Creek	
William Avila	Mobile home	McNairy	Rose Creek	
Myrna Correa	Mobile home	McNairy	Rose Creek	
Allen Littlefield	Mobile home	McNairy	Rose Creek	
Raymond Gegner	Unknown	McNairy	Old Stage Road	
Nancy Gegner	Unknown	McNairy	Old Stage Road	
Charles Cook	Mobile home	McNairy	Millard Lane	
Lisa Cook	Mobile home	McNairy	Millard Lane	
Billie Pinckney	Mobile home	McNairy	Adamsville	

== See also ==
- Tornadoes in Tennessee
- Tornadoes of 2023
- Tornado outbreak of March 31 – April 1, 2023
- Tornado outbreak and floods of April 2–7, 2025 – A tornado outbreak that produced another nocturnal EF3 tornado which struck the same areas
- 2015 Holly Springs–Ashland tornado – A violent EF4 tornado 7 years earlier that affected the same areas
- 2023 Clarksville tornado – Another deadly EF3 tornado in Tennessee months later
