= Tornado outbreak of December 23–25, 2015 =

Windstorm that struck the Southeastern United States in December 2015

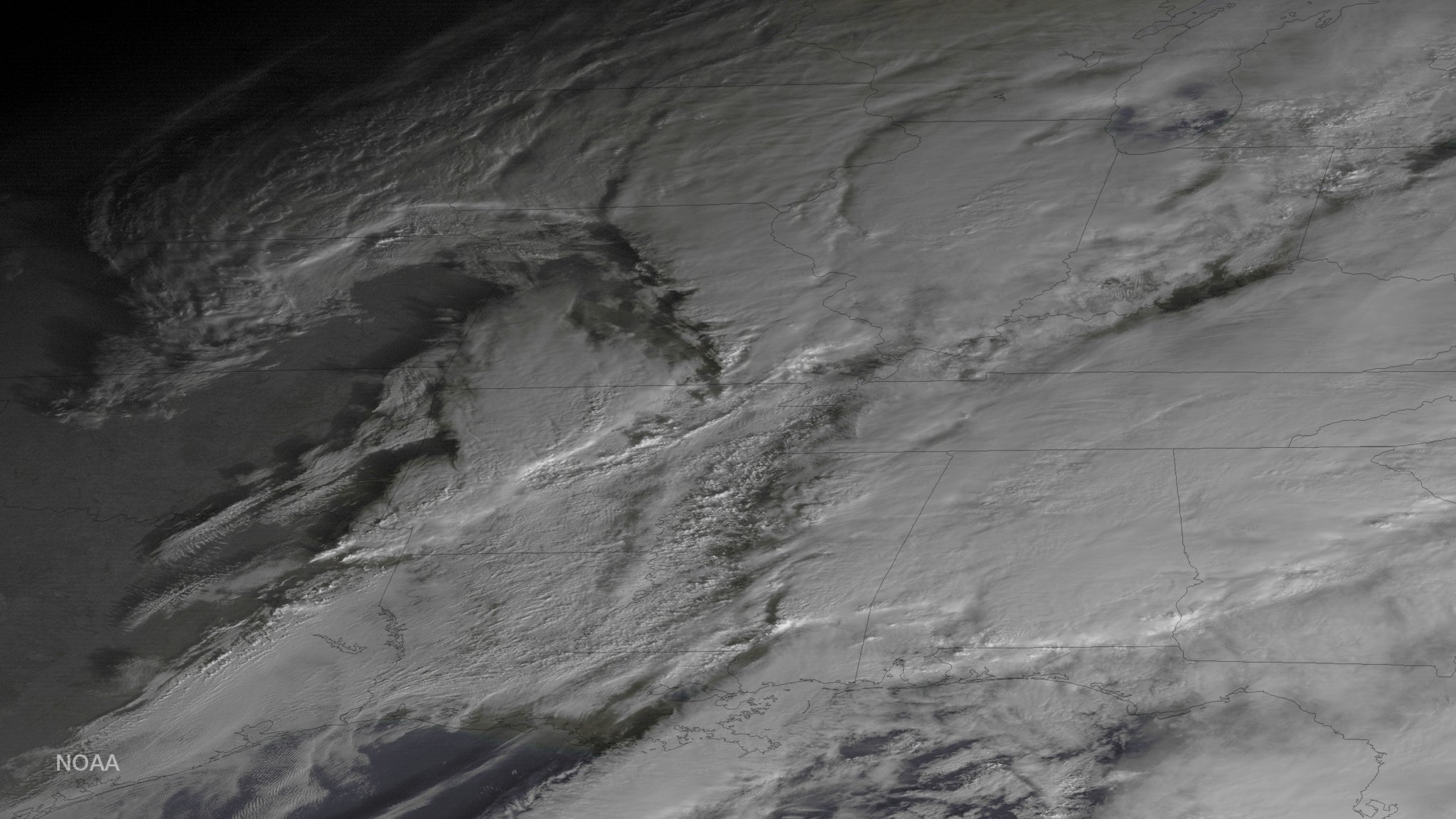
- GOES 13 satellite image of thunderstorms across the Eastern United States on December 23

Meteorological history
- Duration: December 23–25, 2015

Tornado outbreak
- Tornadoes: 38
- Max. rating: EF4 tornado
- Duration: 2 days, 14 hours, 32 minutes
- Highest winds: Tornadic – 170 mph (270 km/h) (Holly Springs, Mississippi EF4 tornado) on December 23
- Highest gusts: Non-tornadic – 90–100 mph (140–160 km/h) near Black Gnat, Kentucky on December 23
- Largest hail: 2.75 in (70 mm) –: Craighead County, Arkansas on December 23; Hinds County, Mississippi on December 24

Overall effects
- Fatalities: 13 fatalities (+5 non-tornadic), 77 injuries
- Damage: $1 billion (2015 USD)
- Areas affected: Central United States (Mississippi, Tennessee, Indiana, Illinois, Alabama)
- Part of the tornado outbreaks of 2015

From December 23–25, 2015, a major tornado outbreak occurred across northern Mississippi and middle Tennessee, resulting in 13 tornado-related deaths and numerous injuries. Other tornadoes occurred as far north as Indiana and Michigan. Scattered tornado activity continued over the next two days before the outbreak ended. This was the first of two deadly tornado outbreaks to impact the southern United States during December 2015 with the other occurring just a day after this one ended.

A large, destructive high-end EF3 tornado touched down south of Clarksdale, Mississippi, killing two people and severely damaging or destroying about 15 homes in that area. The tornado continued to the northeast, later snapping trees and destroying homes near Marks and Como before dissipating. The parent supercell that produced the Clarksdale tornado then produced a new tornado, a violent EF4 wedge that grew to nearly a mile wide and devastated the southern edge of Holly Springs, Ashland and Canaan, killing 9. Another destructive EF3 tornado struck the small community of Lutts, Tennessee, after dark, destroying homes and a church, and completely flattening the local post office. Significant tornado activity continued through parts of Mississippi and Tennessee overnight, including an EF2 tornado near Linden that downed many trees and killed an elderly couple in their small, unanchored home. More tornadoes were reported the following day and on Christmas as well, including a high-end EF2 tornado that destroyed homes in Birmingham. Overall, the outbreak resulted in 38 tornadoes and 13 deaths.

== Metereological synopsis ==
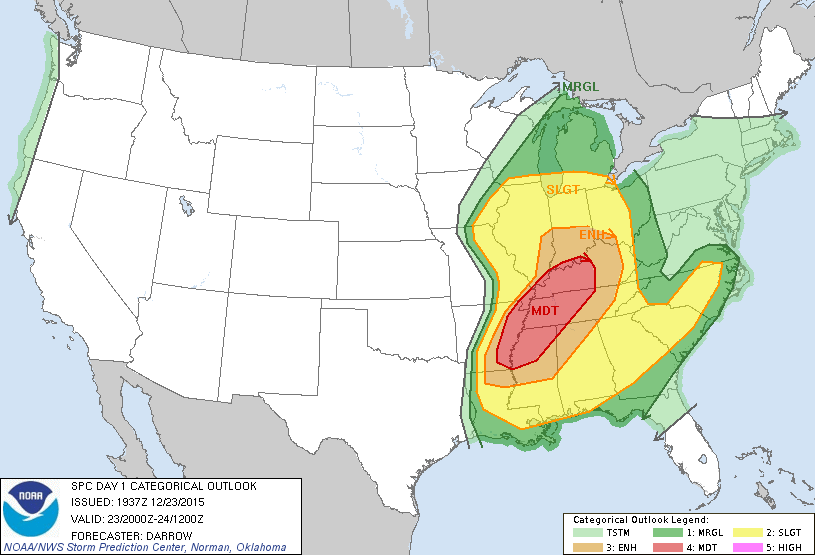

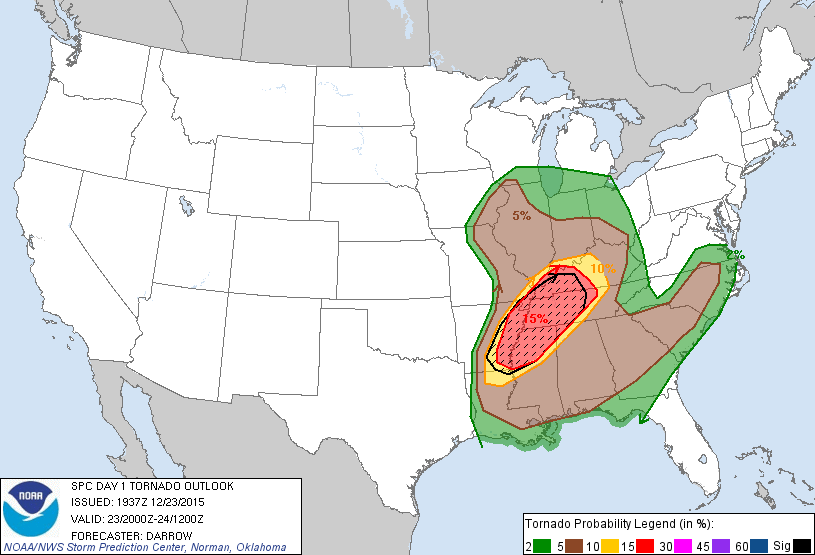
December 23, 1937Z Convective Outlook (above), and respective tornado probability contour (below)

On December 23, 2015, the Storm Prediction Center discussed the probabilities for severe weather to materialize in the Mississippi Valley, encompassing regions in northern Louisiana, eastern Arkansas, northwestern Mississippi, western Tennessee, the Missouri Bootheel, and extreme southwestern Kentucky. A cold front ejecting from the Texas Panhandle and a warm front coming from the lower Ohio River valley, intersected by a stationary front placed over western Kansas, led to the creation of a triple point over northwestern Missouri. This set up the environment for an atmosphere conductive to severe weather. As the evening progressed, further certainty arose for the possibility for an outbreak, as Convective Available Potential Energy values of around 1,000–2,000 J/kg and effective wind shear were present for the aforementioned areas of the upper Mississippi Valley. Solar heating in these areas gave way for effective buoyancy in the area, further improving the conditions for supercells and to develop. Given the favorable parameters, the SPC, alongside its Convective outlook, introduced a 15% hatched area for tornadoes, indicating the probability for a few strong tornadoes to occur, as discrete supercell thunderstorms were expected to develop in the area. As such, the SPC issued a PDS tornado watch, the first of multiple tornado watches that day, for northern Louisiana, western Arkansas, northwestern Mississippi, and western Tennessee, highlighting the elevated threat for strong tornadoes in the area. At 2000 UTC, the SPC introduced an increased area for the concern of strong tornadoes, extending the existent area to reach central Tennessee, northwestern Alabama, and central portions of Kentucky.

The first tornadoes of the day occurred in the Midwest, where an EF1 tornado that touched down in Greenwood, Indiana, where several homes sustained damage. Another tornado caused damage to homes in the Indianapolis suburb of Noblesville. In Illinois, a tornado destroyed multiple outbuildings and downed trees near the town of Sciota. The outbreak also spawned the only known tornado to touch down in Michigan during the month of December, an EF1 tornado that struck the Detroit suburb of Canton, causing considerable damage to vehicles, an industrial park, and a gas station.

In the area with the greatest risk for tornadoes, multiple supercells developed by noon, soon becoming tornadic. A strong EF2 tornado occurred near Marianna, Arkansas, completely destroying mobile homes, tearing roofs off of frame homes, and damaging cabins in the area. A large EF3 tornado eventually touched down south of Clarksdale, Mississippi, killing two people and severely damaging or destroying about 15 homes in that area. The tornado continued to the northeast, later snapping trees and destroying homes near Marks and Como before dissipating. The same parent supercell produced another tornado further east of Como, a violent EF4 tornado that devastated 6 counties in Mississippi and Tennessee along a 75.09 miles (120.85 km) mile long path, killing 9 people. Another destructive EF3 tornado struck the small community of Lutts, Tennessee after dark, destroying multiple homes and a church, and completely leveling the town's post office. Significant tornado activity continued through parts of Mississippi and Tennessee overnight, including an EF2 tornado that killed an elderly couple in their small, unanchored home near Linden, Tennessee. In total, the outbreak produced a total of 13 tornado-related deaths and numerous injuries. Additional scattered tornado activity occurred on the 24th and 25th, including a high-end EF2 tornado that caused heavy damage in the southwestern part of Birmingham, Alabama on Christmas Day.

== Confirmed tornadoes ==
Confirmed tornadoes by Enhanced Fujita rating
EFU	EF0	EF1	EF2	EF3	EF4	EF5	Total
0	12	18	5	2	1	0	38

=== December 23 event ===
List of confirmed tornadoes – Wednesday, December 23, 2015 (Note: All dates are based on the local time zone where the tornado touched down; however, all times are in Coordinated Universal Time for consistency.)
EF#	Location	County / Parish	State	Start Coord.	Time (UTC)	Path length	Max width	Damage (2015 USD)
EF0	SSW of Moncks Corner	Berkeley	SC	33.154°N 80.0254°W	0827–0828	0.2 mi (0.32 km)	100 yd (91 m)	$18,000
EF0	A brief tornado tossed roofing material, impaled a piece of wood into the side of a building, and destroyed a 200 square foot (19 m^{2}) shed; the shed's roof was tossed 300 ft (91 m). A telephone pole was blown over, multiple 150 pounds (68 kg) carts were tossed away from the site of the shed, and a convergent damage signature was visible in vegetation farther along the path as well.							
EF1	ESE of Bee Branch	Van Buren	AR	35.4345°N 92.3409°W	1420–1421	0.18 mi (0.29 km)	75 yd (69 m)	$80,000
EF1	A brief, weak tornado destroyed a home east of Bee Branch.							
EF1	ESE of Van Buren	Carter	MO	36.9198°N 90.9328°W	1543–1551	6 mi (9.7 km)	100 yd (91 m)	$90,000
EF1	An old abandoned school house was nearly destroyed in the small community of Chilton, and a few homes received siding and shingle damage. The metal roofing of an old saw mill was damaged, and hundreds of trees were snapped or uprooted as well.							
EF1	W of Mill Spring	Wayne	MO	37.07°N 90.7726°W	1556–1559	2.95 mi (4.75 km)	50 yd (46 m)	$5,000
EF1	Several trees were snapped or uprooted and large tree branches were broken.							
EF1	NE of Patterson	Wayne	MO	37.1851°N 90.5636°W	1608–1612	3.04 mi (4.89 km)	75 yd (69 m)	$50,000
EF1	A couple dozen tree trunks were snapped and large tree branches were broken or snapped.							
EF0	E of Ava	Jackson	IL	37.88°N 89.4817°W	1715–1721	6 mi (9.7 km)	50 yd (46 m)	$5,000
EF0	Many trees were snapped or uprooted.							
EF1	E of Pinckneyville to Southern Tamaroa	Perry	IL	38.08°N 89.2973°W	1723–1729	5.03 mi (8.10 km)	200 yd (180 m)	$175,000
EF1	Numerous trees were snapped or uprooted, several barns sustained severe structural damage, and several homes experienced varying degrees of roof damage.							
EF1	WSW of Albion	Wayne, Edwards	IL	38.3499°N 88.1894°W	1830–1836	4.28 mi (6.89 km)	100 yd (91 m)	$13,000
EF1	A few trees were uprooted, while several were snapped. A home sustained partial shingle loss, and a barn also had its roof damaged.							
EF1	NW of Carmi	White	IL	38.08°N 88.1976°W	1832–1835	1.58 mi (2.54 km)	100 yd (91 m)	$75,000
EF1	Trees were uprooted or snapped near Burrell Woods Campground.							
EF1	Greenwood	Johnson	IN	39.6061°N 86.1638°W	2042–2043	0.3 mi (0.48 km)	40 yd (37 m)	$250,000
EF1	Three homes sustained structural damage and several trees were uprooted.							
EF3	NE of Shelby to E of Como	Bolivar, Coahoma, Quitman, Panola	MS	34.0026°N 90.7126°W	2054–2157	61.57 mi (99.09 km)	800 yd (730 m)	$2,354,000
EF3	2 deaths – Power poles were bent at EF0 strength near Shelby before the tornado reached EF3 strength near Clarksdale, where trees were debarked and small frame homes and mobile homes were completely destroyed. Airplanes and metal buildings were destroyed at a small airport in this area as well. EF1 tree damage occurred near Marks and Sledge before the tornado regained high-end EF3 strength between Como and Sardis, where a brick home was completely leveled, and another had its exterior walls collapse before the tornado dissipated east of Como as the Holly Springs EF4 tornado developed just to the east. A total of 28 people were injured.							
EF1	Noblesville	Hamilton	IN	40.016°N 86.0718°W	2055–2057	0.7 mi (1.1 km)	140 yd (130 m)	$50,000
EF1	A mobile home was flipped over and destroyed, and a trampoline was blown onto a mailbox.							
EF2	S of Marianna	Lee	AR	34.694°N 90.7741°W	2057–2102	4.65 mi (7.48 km)	100 yd (91 m)	$100,000
EF2	The tornado flattened grain bins, removed the roof from a brick house, destroyed a mobile home, and damaged cabins.							
EF1	WNW of Williamstown	Decatur, Rush	IN	39.4519°N 85.4827°W	2113–2115	0.78 mi (1.26 km)	50 yd (46 m)	$25,000
EF1	One barn was destroyed, another barn had roof panels torn off, and tree limbs were snapped.							
EF0	S of Pueblo	Spencer	IN	37.8055°N 87.1194°W	2139–2142	2.05 mi (3.30 km)	50 yd (46 m)	$3,000
EF0	Tree limbs were broken and small trees were snapped.							
EF0	E of Fountain City to Bethel	Wayne	IN	39.96°N 84.88°W	2157–2205	3.25 mi (5.23 km)	30 yd (27 m)	$150,000
EF0	Multiple outbuildings were destroyed and barns were damaged. The tornado struck the town of Bethel before dissipating, where a church sustained roof damage and had its chimney collapsed.							
EF4	NNE of Sardis, MS to NE of Selmer, TN	Tate (MS), Marshall (MS), Benton (MS), Tippah (MS), Hardeman (TN), McNairy (TN)	MS, TN	34.5955°N 89.7055°W	2210–2325	75.09 mi (120.85 km)	1,300 yd (1,200 m)	$10,922,000
EF4	9 deaths – See article on this tornado – 36 people were injured.							
EF0	E of Arcanum	Darke	OH	39.99°N 84.52°W	2212–2215	0.03 mi (0.048 km)	20 yd (18 m)	$6,000
EF0	A brief tornado lifted the roof off a large metal building.							
EF1	SW of Sciota to S of Roseville	McDonough, Warren	IL	40.5391°N 90.7834°W	2215–2230	10.7 mi (17.2 km)	50 yd (46 m)	$0
EF1	Outbuildings were destroyed, and a few trees were snapped.							
EF0	WSW of Reynolds to E of Andalusia	Mercer, Rock Island	IL	41.3153°N 90.7731°W	2233–2246	10.62 mi (17.09 km)	50 yd (46 m)	$0
EF0	Several trees and tree branches were snapped off.							
EF1	Hiawatha	Linn	IA	42.0507°N 91.7219°W	2234–2238	2.25 mi (3.62 km)	50 yd (46 m)	$0
EF1	Approximately twelve homes sustained roof and siding damage, and trees were snapped or uprooted.							
EF1	SW of Jackson	Madison	TN	35.5549°N 89.0729°W	2243–2244	1.21 mi (1.95 km)	50 yd (46 m)	$25,000
EF1	Several storage buildings and barns were damaged, and a home sustained roof damage.							
EF1	Canton	Wayne	MI	42.33°N 83.463°W	2343–2346	1.96 mi (3.15 km)	100 yd (91 m)	$500,000
EF1	A tornado downed trees and tree limbs in residential areas, caused considerable damage to metal buildings and vehicles at an industrial park, and tore the metal roof off of a gas station. It is the only known tornado to have occurred in Michigan during the month of December.							
EF1	NW of Luxemburg	Dubuque	IA	42.6083°N 91.0986°W	2338–2340	1.1 mi (1.8 km)	25 yd (23 m)	$0
EF1	Trees and outbuildings were damaged on two farms.							
EF1	W of Booneville	Prentiss	MS	34.6622°N 88.6863°W	0016–0020	3.93 mi (6.32 km)	80 yd (73 m)	$100,000
EF1	Several mobile homes were damaged or destroyed, trees were uprooted, and a house slid off of its foundation.							
EF2	SSE of Linden to SW of Centerville	Perry, Hickman	TN	35.5499°N 87.8145°W	0017–0032	14.92 mi (24.01 km)	500 yd (460 m)	$2,000,000
EF2	2 deaths – Numerous sheds, barns, and outbuildings were destroyed, along with a small, unanchored home along U.S. Highway 412 (where the two fatalities occurred). A brick home sustained major damage in Perry County, and several other homes were damaged in Hickman County. Hundreds of trees were downed along the path.							
EF3	SW of Lutts to SW of Mount Pleasant	Wayne, Lawrence, Lewis, Maury	TN	35.1353°N 87.9651°W	0055–0152	48.38 mi (77.86 km)	800 yd (730 m)	$5,210,000
EF3	See Section on this tornado – 7 people were injured.							
EF2	N of Waterloo, AL to NNW of Cypress Inn, TN	Lauderdale (AL), Wayne (TN)	AL, TN	34.954°N 88.0731°W	0100–0117	14.87 mi (23.93 km)	400 yd (370 m)	>$100,000
EF2	In Lauderdale County, large sections of roofing was removed from two houses and a church, another home sustained minor damage, a mobile home was pushed off its foundation, and many trees were downed. Moving into Wayne County, the tornado destroyed one home and downed dozens more trees before lifting. One person was injured in a house in Lauderdale County.							
EF1	S of Butler	Pendleton	KY	38.7167°N 84.371°W	0111–0116	3.75 mi (6.04 km)	440 yd (400 m)	$120,000
EF1	An anchored mobile home was rolled over, a 15-square-foot (1.4 m^{2}) dock was broken loose and pulled across a pond, a barn was destroyed, and three more barns were damaged, with one's roof being ripped off and thrown into adjacent trees. A camper was lifted 10 to 15 feet (3.0 to 4.6 m) above a stand of trees before being dropped and destroyed, heavy sections of horse corral fencing were carried approximately 50 yards (46 m), a house lost part of its roof, and two more homes sustained structural damage consisting of roof damage and blown in garage doors. Many trees were downed along the path, and three people were injured.							
EF2	ESE of Alexandria to E of Lancaster	DeKalb, Smith	TN	36.0614°N 85.9708°W	0414–0425	8.92 mi (14.36 km)	250 yd (230 m)	$400,000
EF2	Three homes and a log cabin home sustained minor roof damage, two barns were heavily damaged, and a cinder-block garage and a small shed were destroyed. Another home lost its roof, two exterior walls on the second level, two covered porches, and an adjacent carport. Many trees were downed along the path, which crossed the Smith Fork Creek seven times between Temperance Hall and Lancaster. This was the first December tornado recorded in both counties.							
EF0	Parkersburg	Wood	WV	39.2474°N 81.5966°W	0425–0426	0.18 mi (0.29 km)	25 yd (23 m)	$100,000
EF0	A brief tornado touched down in Parkersburg, causing roof damage to several buildings. An old church had its roof completely removed.							

=== December 24 event ===
List of confirmed tornadoes – Thursday, December 24, 2015
EF#	Location	County / Parish	State	Start Coord.	Time (UTC)	Path length	Max width	Damage (2015 USD)
EF0	E of Comer	Barbour	AL	32.027°N 85.339°W	0941–0948	3.6 mi (5.8 km)	100 yd (91 m)	$0
EF0	Several trees were downed along U.S. Highway 82.							
EF0	WNW of Clayton	Barbour	AL	31.8829°N 85.5918°W	1034–1040	3.16 mi (5.09 km)	125 yd (114 m)	$0
EF0	Two sheds were damaged, and numerous trees were downed.							
EF0	SW of Culloden	Upson	GA	32.8212°N 84.1342°W	1829–1830	0.2 mi (0.32 km)	80 yd (73 m)	$15,000
EF0	Several trees were snapped or uprooted, and a small shed was destroyed.							

=== December 25 event ===
List of confirmed tornadoes – Friday, December 25, 2015
EF#	Location	County / Parish	State	Start Coord.	Time (UTC)	Path length	Max width	Damage (2015 USD)
EF1	Shelbyville	Bedford	TN	35.495°N 86.4099°W	1318–1319	0.48 mi (0.77 km)	75 yd (69 m)	$50,000
EF1	Two large sections of roofing were torn off a Rubbermaid factory, with roofing gravel being blown in all directions and several company vehicles being damaged. Six empty tractor-trailers were blown around and partially stacked, and several garage doors failed, with at least three being blown back into the building. A Calsonic building was also impacted, with two windows blown out, a glass door blown in, and a carport being damaged. Elsewhere, a large tree was blown down, tree branches were broken off, and a few metal signs were smashed to the ground.							
EF0	SE of Coaling	Tuscaloosa	AL	33.1063°N 87.3473°W	2129–2142	4.98 mi (8.01 km)	185 yd (169 m)	$0
EF0	Approximately one dozen trees were snapped or uprooted.							
EF0	SE of Pineville	Smith	MS	32.1053°N 89.3766°W	2151–2152	0.74 mi (1.19 km)	50 yd (46 m)	$12,000
EF0	A chicken house had its tin roof partially torn off, and multiple trees were downed.							
EF2	Southwestern Birmingham	Jefferson	AL	33.4433°N 86.9137°W	2255–2259	0.88 mi (1.42 km)	130 yd (120 m)	$0
EF2	A brief but strong tornado touched down near Midfield and impacted approximately 50 homes, many of which sustained varying degrees of roof damage and 15 of which were left uninhabitable due to heavy damage. Two of these small homes were nearly flattened. Many trees were snapped or uprooted along the path as well. Two people were injured.							

=== Holly Springs–Ashland, Mississippi/Selmer, Tennessee ===
Holly Springs–Ashland, Mississippi/Selmer, Tennessee
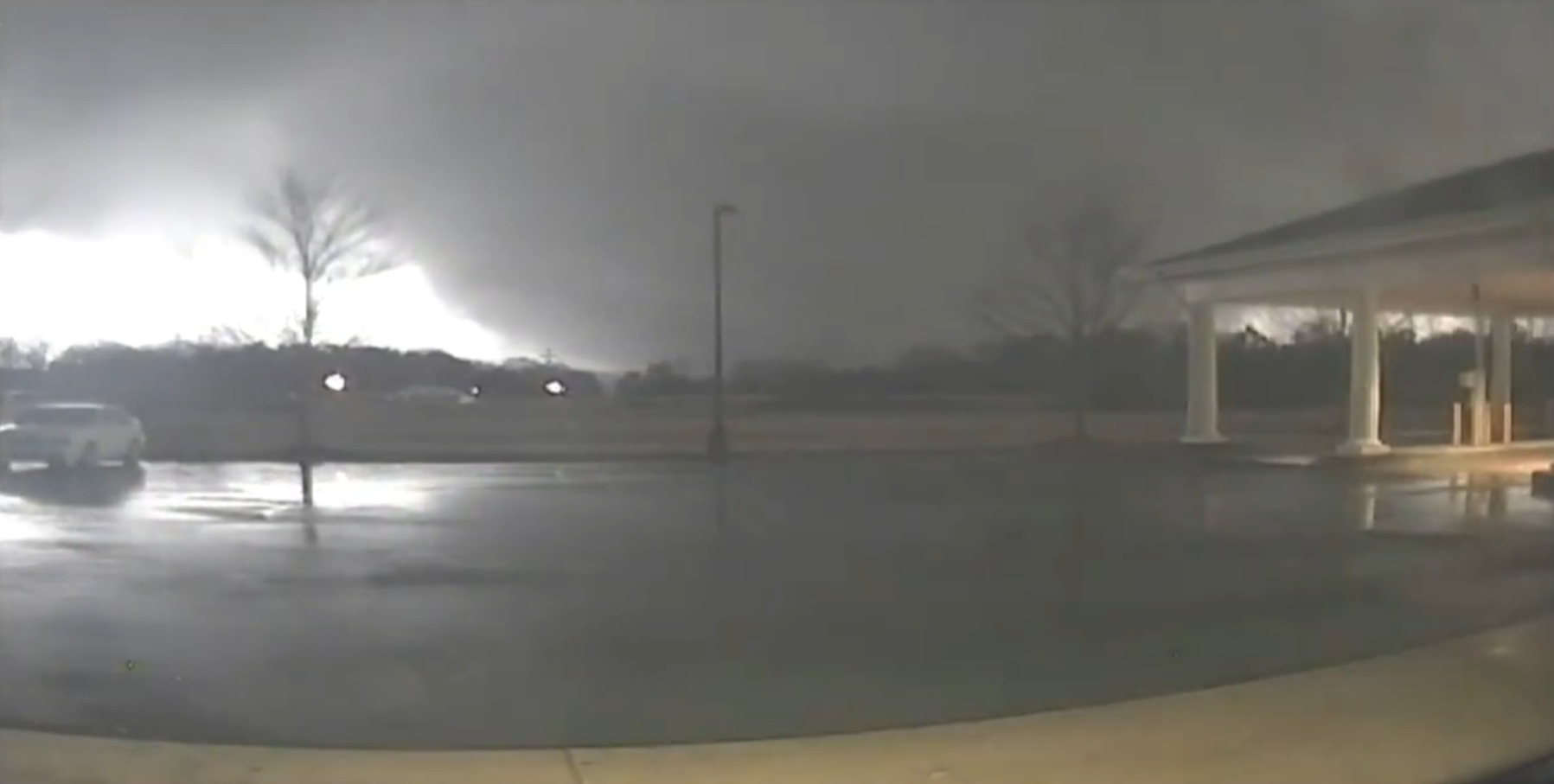
- A CCTV still of the tornado as it moved through Holly Springs

Meteorological history
- Formed: December 23, 2015, 4:10 pm CST (UTC−06:00)
- Dissipated: December 23, 2015, 5:25 pm CST (UTC−06:00)
- Duration: 1 hour, 15 minutes

EF4 tornado
- on the Enhanced Fujita scale
- Highest winds: 170 mph (270 km/h)

Overall effects
- Fatalities: 9
- Injuries: 36
- Damage: $10.922 million

This violent and deadly wedge tornado, which originated from the same cell that produced the Como, Mississippi EF3, touched down in Tate County, Mississippi to the southwest of Holly Springs, initially only causing EF0 tree damage. The tornado rapidly intensified to EF3 strength as it entered Marshall County, obliterating several mobile homes and sweeping away multiple unanchored block foundation homes. A 12-year-old child survived being thrown 300 yards in this area when the mobile home he was in disintegrated. The tornado continued towards Holly Springs, prompting a tornado emergency and leveling a church at high-end EF3 strength. Brick homes in the area had their roofs removed and exterior walls collapsed. The tornado then impacted the south edge of town, causing major damage to a motor sports park, snapping numerous hardwood trees, and destroying homes in the area. The damage that occurred at the Holly Springs Motor Sports Park was particularly severe. Two cinder block restroom facility buildings at this location were reduced to bare slabs with the plumbing fixtures ripped away and missing, and a large 30,000-pound (13,610 kg) motor home was found upside-down 100 meters away from where it originated, resting on the foundation of a small two-story office building that was completely leveled. A 25-foot section of the top half of the reinforced concrete drag strip wall was broken off with the connecting rebar sheared off, likely as a result of a vehicle being slammed into it during the tornado. A dragster and a company van were both thrown 200 meters, and a metal-framed service garage building was obliterated with anchor bolts ripped out of the foundation and a large engine winch torn from its anchors and blown off of the slab. Ground scouring and debarking of trees occurred on the property as well, and a large section of the aluminum grandstands was blown 500 yards. Two people were killed in Holly Springs, and several others were injured. The tornado continued to intensify as it entered Benton County and passed to the northeast of Ashland, where it reached very high-end EF3 strength as it completely flattened several poorly anchored frame homes, scoured pavement from a road, mangled vehicles beyond recognition, and killed multiple people. An unanchored home in this area was obliterated and swept away along with much of its block foundation, leaving little trace behind. Trees in the area were debarked, a metal warehouse building was damaged, and a brick church had its roof torn off as well.

Continuing to the northeast, the tornado reached EF4 strength near the rural community of Canaan, where trees were debarked and a large home was completely leveled and mostly swept away, leaving much of the foundation slab bare. Two other homes in this area were heavily damaged at EF2 strength. The tornado continued into Tippah County at EF3 strength as it destroyed several homes and a metal warehouse building near Walnut. The tornado maintained EF3 intensity crossed the state line into Tennessee, entering Hardeman County and passing near Middleton, damaging several homes in the area. Continuing into McNairy County, the tornado destroyed several additional homes at the south edge of Selmer before dissipating. Overall, 9 people were killed along the path and 36 others were injured.

=== Lutts–Summertown–Sandy Hook, Tennessee ===
Lutts–Summertown–Sandy Hook, Tennessee
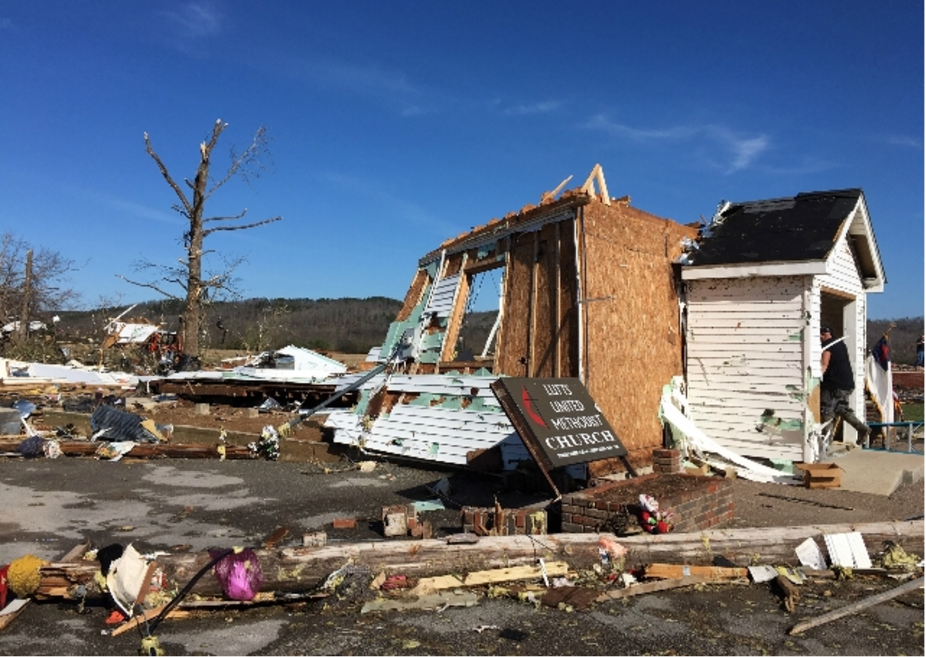
- EF3 damage to a church in Lutts, Tennessee

Meteorological history
- Formed: December 23, 2015, 6:55 pm CST (UTC−06:00)
- Dissipated: December 23, 2015, 7:52 pm CST (UTC−06:00)
- Duration: 57 minutes

EF3 tornado
- on the Enhanced Fujita scale
- Highest winds: 157 mph (253 km/h)

Overall effects
- Fatalities: 0
- Injuries: 7
- Damage: $4.100 million

At around 6:55 p.m. CST (UTC-06:00), this intense, and long tracked tornado first touched down east of the Hardin/Wayne County line just 2.5 miles (4.0 km) southwest of the town of Lutts. At the area of touchdown, hundreds of trees were snapped and uprooted, before it rapidly reached its peak intensity as it moved northeast into the southwestern side of Lutts, including Lutts Road where it reached EF3 intensity, and a max width of 800 yards (730 m). In this area, a church, made primarily of brick, had many of its walls collapsed and its roof ripped away. Another nearby post office made of brick was completely destroyed, and several homes were completely swept away from their foundations. A total of four people were injured in Lutts. As the tornado continued northeast, hundreds of trees were snapped and uprooted along its path to where a concentrated area of trees were destroyed about 5 miles (8.0 km) north of Collinwood. The tornado continued snapping and uprooting trees up through Highway 64 and Natchez Trace Parkway intersection. In this area, an outbuilding was destroyed, and a nearby mobile home had its roof torn away. Continuing northeast into Lawrence County along Napier Road, a house was swept off of its foundation, and three people were injured. As the tornado continued northeast, several homes struck by the tornado had their roofs heavily damaged or completely ripped away along Linville Road. The tornado would then continue towards the northeast, passing west-northwest of Summertown before crossing into Lewis County. After crossing into Lewis County, the tornado would continue its track for 3.45 miles (5.55 km) before tracking into Maury County where it would destroy a barn, and many more trees were snapped or uprooted along Joy Road, 2 miles (3.2 km) southwest of Mount Pleasant. The tornado would continue to weaken and would dissipate at 7:52 p.m. CST (UTC-06:00) north of Joy Road near the community of Sandy Hook. In total, this tornado tracked 48.51 miles (78.07 km) across Middle Tennessee, had an economic cost of $4.100 million (2015 USD), and injured a total of 7 people.

== Non-tornadic effects ==
4–8 in (100–200 mm) of rain fell in Alabama during the storms.

== See also ==
- Weather of 2015
- December 2015 North American storm complex
- Tornado outbreak of December 16–17, 2019
- Tornado outbreak of December 10–11, 2021
