= Flat Gap, Tennessee =

Coordinates: 36°03′44″N 83°28′40″W

- Unincorporated community
- Interactive map of Flat Gap, Tennessee
- Country: United States
- State: Tennessee
- County: Wayne
- Established: 1800s
- Time zone: Central (CST)
  - Summer (DST): CDT
- Area code: 931

Flat Gap is an unincorporated community located in Wayne County, Tennessee. The community is just off U.S. Route 64 near the Hardin County line.

== Nearby communities ==
- Houston, Tennessee
- Olivehill, Tennessee
- Clifton, Tennessee
- Martin's Mills, Tennessee
- Lutts, Tennessee
