= Houston, Tennessee =

- Unincorporated community
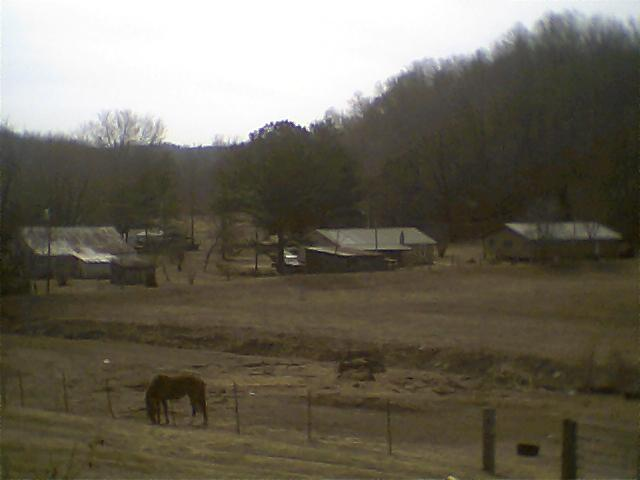
- Downtown Houston on March 7, 2010.

- Location within Tennessee
- Coordinates: 35°14′29″N 87°55′04″W
- Country: United States
- State: Tennessee
- County: Wayne
- Established: 1800s
- Elevation: 538 ft (164 m)

Population
  - Total: Unknown
- Time zone: Central (CST)
  - Summer (DST): CDT
- ZIP code: 38485 (Waynesboro) & 38450 (Collinwood)
- Area code: 931

Houston is an unincorporated community in Wayne County, Tennessee.

== Geography ==
Houston, Tennessee is located southwest of Waynesboro. There are numerous creeks and branches in Houston which include: Indian Creek, Rayburn Creek, Davis Branch, and many more small streams. This area consists of timberland, hills, and pastureland. There are no major highways in this community. The only roads consists of county roads.

== History ==
At one time Houston was the size of a small town with stores, a post office, and a school.

== Economy ==
The economy of Houston is mainly agricultural, with main crops of corn and soybean.

== Nearby cities & communities ==
- Waynesboro
- Clifton
- Collinwood
- Lutts
- Martin's Mills
- Olive Hill
