= Lutts, Tennessee =

- Unincorporated community
- Nickname: Pinhook
- Location within Tennessee
- Coordinates: 35°09′04″N 87°56′17″W
- Country: United States
- State: Tennessee
- County: Wayne
- Elevation: 581 ft (177 m)

Population (2010)Population of the Zip Code for Lutts
  - Total: 530.
- Time zone: Central (CST)
  - Summer (DST): CDT
- ZIP code: 38471
- Area code: 931

Lutts is an unincorporated community in Wayne County, Tennessee, United States. It is also known as "Pinhook."

Lutts is served by the Lutts Volunteer Fire Department and Lutts Community Center. The Pinhook School formerly operated in Lutts.

== Economy ==
The economy of Lutts is mainly agricultural. However, there is a growing insurance industry that has been established in the area.

== History ==
Little is known about origins except for the community of Pinhook which used to be the entire eastern section of the town.

== Tornado ==
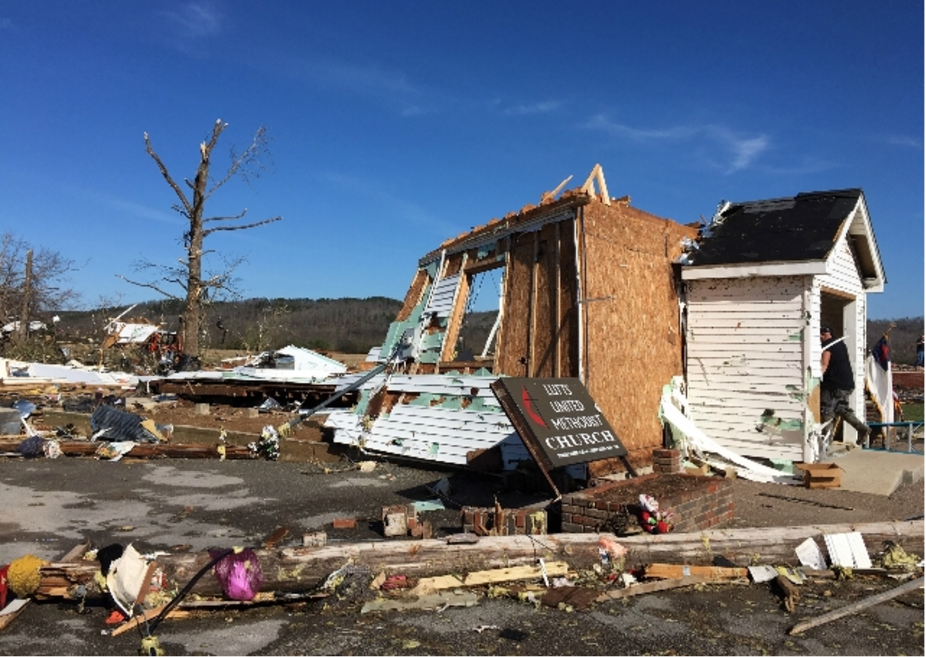
Remains of The Methodist Church building in Lutts after an EF-3 demolished it.

On the evening of December 23, 2015, an EF-3 tornado destroyed over 20 buildings in the Lutts community, including Lutts United Methodist Church and the United States Post Office. Postal operations are temporarily relocated to the office in nearby Collinwood, Tennessee. The Methodist Church will be temporarily relocated to the fire hall.

== Highways ==
- Tennessee State Route 203

== Churches in or near Lutts ==
- Bevis Church of Christ
- Johnson's Chapel Freewill Baptist Church
- Lutts Baptist Church
- Lutts United Methodist Church
- Martin's Mills Church of Christ
- Mt. Hope Church of Christ
- Second Creek Church of Christ
- Schlomo Beth Israel Synagogue
- State Line Church of Christ
- Wayland Springs United Methodist Church

== Nearby cities and communities ==
- Collinwood (city)
- Waynesboro (city)
- Savannah (city)
- Cypress Inn (unincorporated community)
- Houston (unincorporated community)
- Cromwell Crossroads (unincorporated community)
- Martin's Mills (unincorporated community)
