= Martin's Mills, Tennessee =

- Unincorporated community
- Nickname: Martin Mills
- Location within Tennessee
- Coordinates: 35°12′07″N 87°57′07″W
- Country: United States
- State: Tennessee
- County: Wayne
- Established: 1800s
- Elevation: 528 ft (161 m)
- Time zone: Central (CST)
  - Summer (DST): CDT
- ZIP code: 38450 (Collinwood)
- Area code: 931

Martin's Mills is an unincorporated community located in Wayne County, Tennessee. There is one church in Martin's Mills which is Martin's Mills Church of Christ. The Rose Normal Academy and Martin's Mills School formerly operated at Martin's Mills.

== Cemeteries ==
- Davanna Cemetery
- Eaton Cemetery
- Herndon Cemetery
- Rose Cemetery
- Horton Cemetery
- Sinclair Cemetery

== Nearby cities and communities ==
- Lutts
- Houston
- Olivehill
- Collinwood
