= Etheostoma corona =

Conservation status
- Near Threatened (IUCN 3.1)

Scientific classification
- Kingdom: Animalia
- Phylum: Chordata
- Class: Actinopterygii
- Division: Teleostei
- Order: Perciformes
- Family: Percidae
- Genus: Etheostoma
- Species: E. corona

Binomial name
- Etheostoma corona Page & Ceas, 1992

Species of fish

Etheostoma corona, the crown darter, is a species of freshwater ray-finned fish, a darter from the subfamily Etheostomatinae, part of the family Percidae, which also contains the perches, ruffes and pikeperches. It is endemic to the eastern United States, where it is found in Tennessee and Alabama. This species can reach a length of 7.8 cm (3.1 in). The crown darter was first formally described in 1992 by Lawrence M. Page and Patrick A. Ceas with its type locality given as the Little Cypress Creek, which is part of the Tennessee River drainage, 2.4 kilometres (1.5 miles) northwest of Crossroads, Wayne County, Tennessee.
