= Flat Gap =

Flat Gap may refer to:

- Flat Gap, Kentucky, a community in Johnson County, Kentucky
- Flat Gap, Tennessee, a community in Wayne County, Tennessee
