= Forrest Hills, Tennessee =

- Unincorporated community
- Interactive map of Forrest Hills, Tennessee
- Coordinates: 35.3009112°N 87.7675247°W
- Country: United States
- State: Tennessee
- County: Wayne
- Elevation: 896 ft (273 m)
- Time zone: Central (CST)
  - Summer (DST): CDT
- Area code: 931

Forrest Hills is an unincorporated community located in Wayne County, Tennessee.
