= Beech Creek, Tennessee =

- Unincorporated community
- Interactive map of Beech Creek, Tennessee
- Coordinates: 35.419797°N 87.980584°W
- Country: United States
- State: Tennessee
- County: Wayne
- Time zone: Central (CST)
  - Summer (DST): CDT
- Area code: 931

Beech Creek is an unincorporated community and stream located in Wayne County, Tennessee.
