= Cypress Inn, Tennessee =

- Unincorporated community
- Location within Tennessee
- Coordinates: 35°00′43″N 87°49′00″W
- Country: United States
- State: Tennessee
- County: Wayne
- Elevation: 738 ft (225 m)
- Time zone: Central (CST)
  - Summer (DST): CDT
- ZIP code: 38452
- Area code: 931

Cypress Inn is an unincorporated community in Wayne County, Tennessee, United States. It is located near the Alabama state line and is along the Natchez Trace Parkway.

== History ==
Historical records state that the Cypress Inn was the name of an inn along the Natchez Trace. The area grew into a community; even though the inn no longer exists, the name of the community is Cypress Inn. Much of the land has been owned by the same families for generations. Local families include Braunius, Holt, Dodd, Berry, Darby, Montgomery, and Pigg.

== Volunteer Fire Department ==
- Cypress Inn Volunteer Fire Department

== Nearby Cities ==
- Collinwood, Tennessee
- Cloverdale, Alabama
- Iron City, Tennessee
- Waterloo, Alabama
- Florence, Alabama

== Nearby Unincorporated Communities ==
- Lutts, Tennessee

== Highways and Parkways ==
- Tennessee State Route 227
- Natchez Trace Parkway
