= Dogwood Heights, Tennessee =

- Unincorporated community
- Interactive map of Dogwood Heights, Tennessee
- Coordinates: 35.312022°N 87.754747°W
- Country: United States
- State: Tennessee
- County: Wayne
- Elevation: 876 ft (267 m)
- Time zone: Central (CST)
  - Summer (DST): CDT
- Area code: 931

Dogwood Heights is an unincorporated community located in Wayne County, Tennessee.
