= Bethlehem, Tennessee =

- Unincorporated community
- Interactive map of Bethlehem, Tennessee
- Coordinates: 35.155636°N 87.587522°W
- Country: United States
- State: Tennessee
- County: Wayne
- Elevation: 653 ft (199 m)
- Time zone: Central (CST)
  - Summer (DST): CDT
- Area code: 931

Bethlehem is an unincorporated community located in Wayne County, Tennessee.
