= Crossroads, Wayne County, Tennessee =

Crossroads, Tennessee
- Unincorporated community
- Nickname: Whittens Cross Roads
- Location within Tennessee
- Coordinates: 35°03′46″N 87°43′40″W
- Country: United States
- State: Tennessee
- County: Wayne
- Elevation: 945 ft (288 m)
- Time zone: Central (CST)
  - Summer (DST): CDT
- Area code: 931
- GNIS feature ID: 1314912

Crossroads is an unincorporated community located in Wayne County, Tennessee.
