= Leatherwood, Tennessee =

Coordinates: 35°23′39″N 87°50′52″W

- Unincorporated community
- Interactive map of Leatherwood, Tennessee
- Country: United States
- State: Tennessee
- County: Wayne
- Elevation: 463 ft (141 m)
- Time zone: Central (CST)
  - Summer (DST): CDT
- Area code: 931

Leatherwood is an unincorporated community located in Wayne County, Tennessee.

On March 31, 2023, the community was impacted by a destructive EF3-rated tornado.
