= Topsy, Tennessee =

Coordinates: 35°25′32″N 87°42′11″W

- Unincorporated community
- Interactive map of Topsy, Tennessee
- Country: United States
- State: Tennessee
- County: Wayne
- Elevation: 709 ft (216 m)

Population
  - Total: Unknown
- Time zone: Central (CST)
  - Summer (DST): CDT
- Area code: 931

Topsy is an unincorporated community located in Wayne County, Tennessee. A volunteer fire department and a small store are located in Topsy.

Topsy was named after a local mule noticed by the naming committee when they were unable to come up with another suitable name.
