= Ashland, Tennessee =

- Unincorporated community
- Location within Tennessee
- Coordinates: 35°26′10″N 87°40′03″W
- Country: United States
- State: Tennessee
- County: Wayne
- Elevation: 725 ft (221 m)
- Time zone: Central (CST)
  - Summer (DST): CDT
- Area code: 931
- GNIS ID: 1314607

Ashland is an unincorporated community located in Wayne County, Tennessee, United States.
