= Cromwell Crossroads, Tennessee =

- Unincorporated community
- Location within Tennessee
- Coordinates: 35°08′12″N 87°49′42″W
- Country: United States
- State: Tennessee
- County: Wayne
- Elevation: 981 ft (299 m)
- Time zone: Central (CST)
  - Summer (DST): CDT
- ZIP code: 38450 (Collinwood)
- Area code: 931
- GNIS feature ID: 1314910

Cromwell Crossroads is an unincorporated community located in Wayne County, Tennessee.

== Economy ==
Cromwell Crossroads has an agricultural economy. There are a few Businesses located in Cromwell Crossroads which are listed below:

- Crossroads General Store and Café
- Bear Creek Country Cookin
- Bear Creek Tire Shop

== Highways ==
- Tennessee State Route 203
