= Canaan, Mississippi =

- Unincorporated community
- Location within Mississippi Location within the United States
- Coordinates: 34°55′49″N 89°07′36″W
- Country: United States
- State: Mississippi
- County: Benton
- Elevation: 604 ft (184 m)
- Time zone: UTC-6 (Central (CST))
  - Summer (DST): UTC-5 (CDT)
- Area code: 662
- GNIS feature ID: 692825

Canaan, (also known as Hoods Mill), is an unincorporated community in Benton County, Mississippi, United States. A post office operated under the name Canaan from 1855 to 1984.
