= Olivehill, Tennessee =

- Unincorporated community
- Location within Tennessee Location within the United States
- Coordinates: 35°16′26″N 88°01′56″W
- Country: United States
- State: Tennessee
- County: Hardin
- Elevation: 541 ft (165 m)
- Time zone: UTC-6 (Central (CST))
  - Summer (DST): UTC-5 (CDT)
- ZIP code: 38475
- Area code: 731
- GNIS feature ID: 1296412

Olivehill is an unincorporated community in Hardin County, Tennessee. Olivehill is located on U.S. Route 64 and Tennessee State Route 15, east of Savannah and west of Waynesboro.

Until the 2000 census, Olivehill was a census county division (CCD) for the U.S. Census. In the 2010 U.S. Census, CCDs for Tennessee were converted to minor civil divisions (MCDs) based on county commissioner districts.

Historical population
Census	Pop.	Note	%±
1980	2,876		—
1990	3,065		6.6%
2000	3,697		20.6%
