= Wayne County, Tennessee =

County in Tennessee, United States

- County
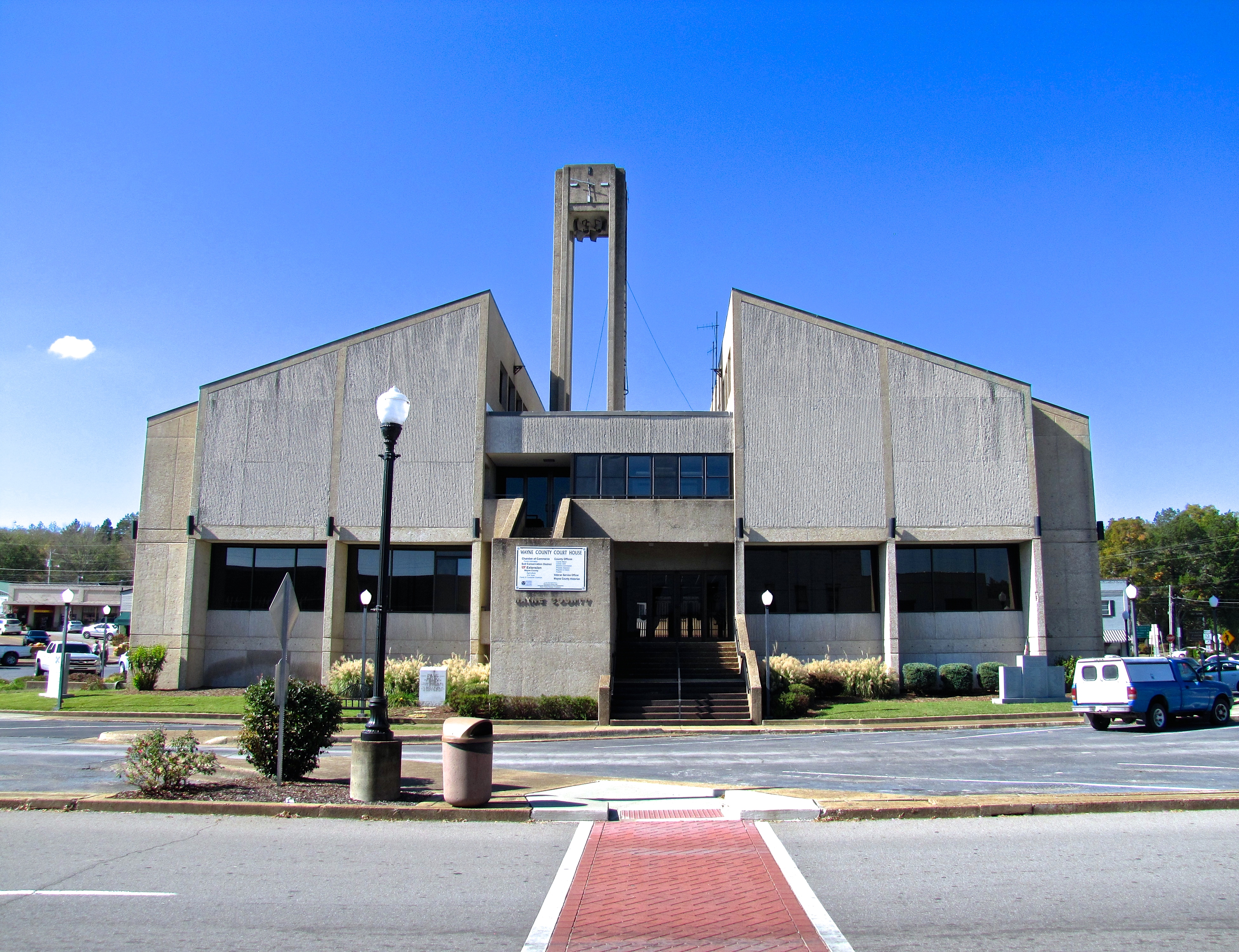
- Wayne County Courthouse in Waynesboro

- Location within the U.S. state of Tennessee
- Coordinates: 35°14′N 87°47′W
- Country: United States
- State: Tennessee
- Founded: 1817
- Named for: General Anthony Wayne
- Seat: Waynesboro
- Largest city: Waynesboro

Area
  - Total: 736 sq mi (1,910 km^{2})
  - Land: 734 sq mi (1,900 km^{2})
  - Water: 1.6 sq mi (4.1 km^{2}) 0.2%

Population (2020)
  - Total: 16,232
  - Estimate (2025): 16,416 ▲
  - Density: 22.1/sq mi (8.54/km^{2})
- Time zone: UTC−6 (Central)
  - Summer (DST): UTC−5 (CDT)
- Congressional district: 7th
- Website: www.waynecountytn.org

Wayne County is a county located in south central Tennessee, along the Alabama border. As of the 2020 census, the population was 16,232. Its county seat is Waynesboro. The county is named after General "Mad Anthony" Wayne, a prominent military leader in the American Revolutionary War.

== History ==
Wayne County was created in 1817 from parts of Hickman and Humphreys counties. Waynesboro, its county seat, was established in 1821. Located along the Tennessee River, the city of Clifton emerged as a key river port in the mid-19th century.

Like several other counties on the Western Highland Rim near the Tennessee River, Wayne County was largely pro-Union during the Civil War, contrary to the generally pro-Confederate sympathies of West and Middle Tennessee. In Tennessee's Ordinance of Secession referendum on June 8, 1861, Wayne County voted to remain in the Union by a margin of 905 to 409. Wayne was one of only eight counties in West or Middle Tennessee to support the Union, and had the second highest vote against secession of these eight, behind only Fentress County. Earlier on February 9, 1861, Wayne County voters had voted against holding a secession convention by a margin of 737 to 255.

== Geography ==
According to the U.S. Census Bureau, the county has a total area of 736 square miles (1,910 km^{2}), of which 734 square miles (1,900 km^{2}) is land and 1.6 square miles (4.1 km^{2}) (0.2%) is water. It is the second-largest county in Tennessee by area. The county lies primarily along the southwestern Highland Rim. The Tennessee River flows along Wayne County's northwestern border with Decatur County. The Buffalo River, a tributary of the Duck River, flows through the northern part of Wayne County. The Green River, a tributary of the Buffalo, flows through Waynesboro.

=== Adjacent counties ===
- Perry County (north)
- Lewis County (northeast)
- Lawrence County (east)
- Lauderdale County, Alabama (south)
- Hardin County (west)
- Decatur County (northwest)

=== National protected area ===
- Natchez Trace Parkway (part)

=== State protected areas ===
- Arnold Hollow Wildlife Management Area
- Browntown Wildlife Management Area
- Eagle Creek Wildlife Management Area
- Tie Camp Wildlife Management Area

== Demographics ==
Historical population
Census	Pop.	Note	%±
1820	2,459		—
1830	6,013		144.5%
1840	7,705		28.1%
1850	8,170		6.0%
1860	9,115		11.6%
1870	10,209		12.0%
1880	11,301		10.7%
1890	11,471		1.5%
1900	12,936		12.8%
1910	12,062		−6.8%
1920	12,877		6.8%
1930	12,134		−5.8%
1940	13,638		12.4%
1950	13,864		1.7%
1960	11,908		−14.1%
1970	12,365		3.8%
1980	13,946		12.8%
1990	12,935		−7.2%
2000	16,842		30.2%
2010	17,021		1.1%
2020	16,232		−4.6%
2025 (est.)	16,416	▲	1.1%
U.S. Decennial Census; 1790–1960 1900–1990; 1990–2000 2010–2014

=== 2020 census ===
Wayne County racial composition
Race	Number	Percentage
White (non-Hispanic)	14,503	89.35%
Black or African American (non-Hispanic)	878	5.41%
Native American	18	0.11%
Asian	27	0.17%
Pacific Islander	1	0.01%
Other/Mixed	426	2.62%
Hispanic or Latino	379	2.33%

As of the 2020 census, the county had a population of 16,232, 6,016 households, and 4,016 families residing in the county.

The median age was 44.4 years. 17.8% of residents were under the age of 18 and 19.7% of residents were 65 years of age or older. For every 100 females there were 126.9 males, and for every 100 females age 18 and over there were 130.7 males age 18 and over.

Of the 6,016 households in the county, 26.3% had children under the age of 18 living in them. Of all households, 48.8% were married-couple households, 19.4% were households with a male householder and no spouse or partner present, and 26.7% were households with a female householder and no spouse or partner present. About 30.0% of all households were made up of individuals and 15.1% had someone living alone who was 65 years of age or older.

There were 7,178 housing units, of which 16.2% were vacant. Among occupied housing units, 78.9% were owner-occupied and 21.1% were renter-occupied. The homeowner vacancy rate was 2.6% and the rental vacancy rate was 9.2%.

<0.1% of residents lived in urban areas, while 100.0% lived in rural areas.

The racial makeup of the county was 89.9% White, 5.5% Black or African American, 0.1% American Indian and Alaska Native, 0.2% Asian, <0.1% Native Hawaiian and Pacific Islander, 1.4% from some other race, and 2.9% from two or more races. Hispanic or Latino residents of any race comprised 2.3% of the population.

=== 2010 census ===
As of the census of 2010, there were 17,021 people, 5,822 households, and 4,321 families residing in the county. The population density was 23 people per square mile (8.9 people/km^{2}). There were 6,701 housing units at an average density of 9 units per square mile (3.5/km^{2}). The racial makeup of the county was 92.3% White, 5.7% Black or African American, 0.3% Native American, 0.2% Asian, 0.01% Pacific Islander, 0.19% from other races, and 1.0% from two or more races. 1.6% of the population were Hispanic or Latino of any race.

There were 5,936 households, out of which 31.00% had children under the age of 18 living with them, 59.10% were married couples living together, 10.10% had a female householder with no husband present, and 27.20% were non-families. 24.40% of all households were made up of individuals, and 10.90% had someone living alone who was 65 years of age or older. The average household size was 2.47 and the average family size was 2.93.

In the county, the population was spread out, with 21.40% under the age of 18, 9.10% from 18 to 24, 31.70% from 25 to 44, 24.20% from 45 to 64, and 13.60% who were 65 years of age or older. The median age was 37 years. For every 100 females there were 121.70 males. For every 100 females age 18 and over, there were 125.50 males.

The median income for a household in the county was $26,576, and the median income for a family was $30,973. Males had a median income of $27,879 versus $19,034 for females. The per capita income for the county was $14,472. About 12.90% of families and 16.30% of the population were below the poverty line, including 18.60% of those under age 18 and 19.60% of those age 65 or over.

=== Religion ===
The religious affiliations of the people of Wayne County, Tennessee are:

- Christian
  - Southern Baptist Convention (47%)
  - United Methodist Church (15%)
  - Independent Free Will Baptist Associations(13%)
  - Churches of Christ (12%)
  - Church of God (5%)
  - National Association of Free Will Baptists (3%)
  - Cumberland Presbyterian Church (2%)
  - Presbyterian Church (1%)
  - International Pentecostal Holiness Church (1%)
  - Catholic Church (1%)
  - Church of God of Prophecy (0.8%)
  - Christian Church (Disciples of Christ) (0.6%)
  - Seventh-day Adventist Church (0.3%)
  - Church of the Nazarene (0.1%)
  - Other (15%)
- Baháʼí (0.1%)

== Politics ==
Wayne County is one of the most staunchly Republican leaning counties in Tennessee as well as the country when it comes to presidential elections. In the 20th century, the county was an enclave of the Republican Party in Middle Tennessee, one of few outside Eastern Tennessee in a state that was up until recently Democratic. No Democratic presidential candidate has carried the county since Samuel J. Tilden in the controversial 1876 election.

United States presidential election results for Wayne County, Tennessee
Year	Republican		Democratic		Third party(ies)	
Year	No.	%	No.	%	No.	%
1912	971	53.80%	435	24.10%	399	22.11%
1916	1,626	75.28%	517	23.94%	17	0.79%
1920	2,617	79.69%	654	19.91%	13	0.40%
1924	1,398	75.24%	448	24.11%	12	0.65%
1928	1,756	81.64%	382	17.76%	13	0.60%
1932	1,082	66.02%	543	33.13%	14	0.85%
1936	1,304	63.89%	733	35.91%	4	0.20%
1940	2,486	69.21%	1,100	30.62%	6	0.17%
1944	2,185	77.48%	630	22.34%	5	0.18%
1948	1,957	68.38%	820	28.65%	85	2.97%
1952	2,439	70.63%	1,008	29.19%	6	0.17%
1956	2,557	70.67%	1,045	28.88%	16	0.44%
1960	2,912	75.21%	931	24.04%	29	0.75%
1964	2,510	68.06%	1,178	31.94%	0	0.00%
1968	2,417	58.51%	506	12.25%	1,208	29.24%
1972	2,898	79.79%	673	18.53%	61	1.68%
1976	2,597	57.57%	1,891	41.92%	23	0.51%
1980	3,418	64.53%	1,633	30.83%	246	4.64%
1984	3,332	68.29%	1,534	31.44%	13	0.27%
1988	3,405	68.77%	1,516	30.62%	30	0.61%
1992	2,955	56.11%	1,868	35.47%	443	8.41%
1996	2,715	58.39%	1,574	33.85%	361	7.76%
2000	3,370	63.51%	1,859	35.04%	77	1.45%
2004	3,999	66.83%	1,951	32.60%	34	0.57%
2008	4,076	73.75%	1,355	24.52%	96	1.74%
2012	4,253	77.52%	1,163	21.20%	70	1.28%
2016	5,036	85.98%	717	12.24%	104	1.78%
2020	5,795	86.89%	820	12.30%	54	0.81%
2024	6,016	88.07%	762	11.16%	53	0.78%

On rare occasions, the county has voted for Democratic candidates for U.S. Senate and state governor. Al Gore carried Wayne County in his 1990 reelection bid, though he never carried in either 1992 or 1996 as Bill Clinton's vice presidential running mate or his campaign for the presidency in 2000, in which he also lost his home state. Aside from Gore, Jim Sasser carried the county in his last successful reelection bid for the Senate in 1988, Ned McWherter carried it in his 1990 reelection bid for governor, and Phil Bredesen carried it in his 2006 gubernatorial reelection bid.

== Education ==
=== College ===
- Columbia State Community College in Clifton

=== Public schools ===
- Wayne County Adult Education Center
- Frank Hughes School
- Waynesboro Elementary School
- Waynesboro Middle School
- Wayne County High School
- Wayne County Technology Center
- Collinwood High School
- Collinwood Middle School
- Collinwood Elementary School

== Media ==
=== Radio ===
- AM 930 WWON Waynesboro, Tennessee
- FM 94.9 WMSR-FM Collinwood, Tennessee
- FM 106.5 WLVS-FM Clifton, Tennessee
- FM 89.9 W210BE Waynesboro, Tennessee
- FM 100.7 WWON-FM Waynesboro, Tennessee

=== Newspaper ===
- The Wayne County News

== Events ==
- Singing on the Farm – Cypress Inn
- Tour De Wayne Bicycle Ride
- Fireworks Show – Waynesboro
- Fourth of July in the Park – Waynesboro
- Wayne County History and Craft Fair – Waynesboro
- Old Timer's Day – Collinwood
- Horseshoe Riverbend Festival – Clifton

== Communities ==
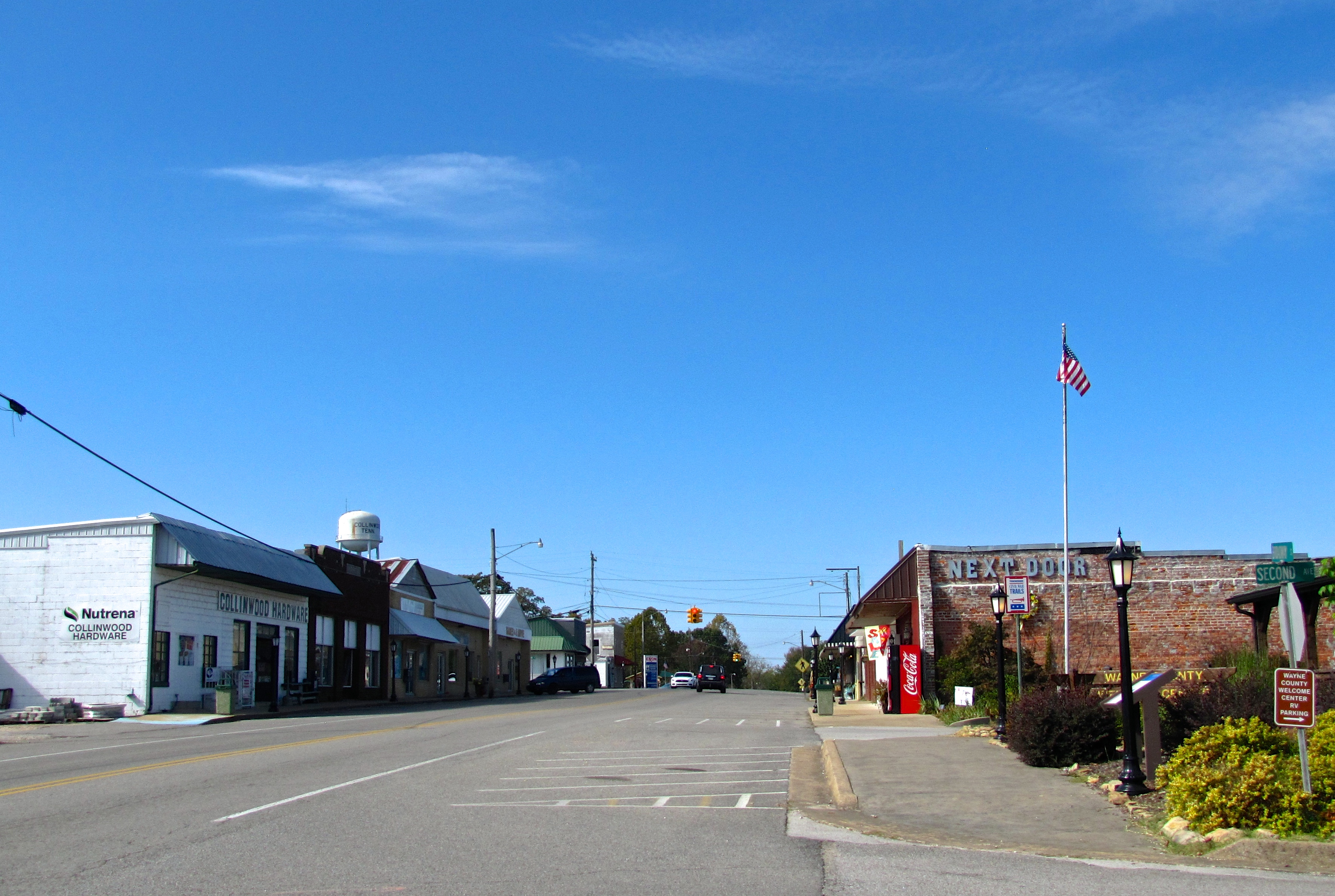
Collinwood

=== Cities ===
- Clifton
- Collinwood
- Waynesboro (county seat)

=== Unincorporated communities ===
- Ashland
- Beech Creek
- Bethlehem
- Cantrell Subdivision
- Clifton Junction
- Cromwell Crossroads
- Crossroads
- Cypress Inn
- Dogwood Heights
- Fairview
- Flat Gap
- Forrest Hills
- Houston
- Iron City (historically, now completely in Lawrence County)
- Leatherwood
- Lutts
- Martin's Mills
- Topsy

== Notable individuals ==
- Lon A. Scott – member of the United States House of Representatives for the 8th congressional district of Tennessee
- Thetus W. Sims – politician and a member of the United States House of Representatives for the 8th congressional district of Tennessee

== See also ==
- National Register of Historic Places listings in Wayne County, Tennessee
