= Collinwood, Tennessee =

- City
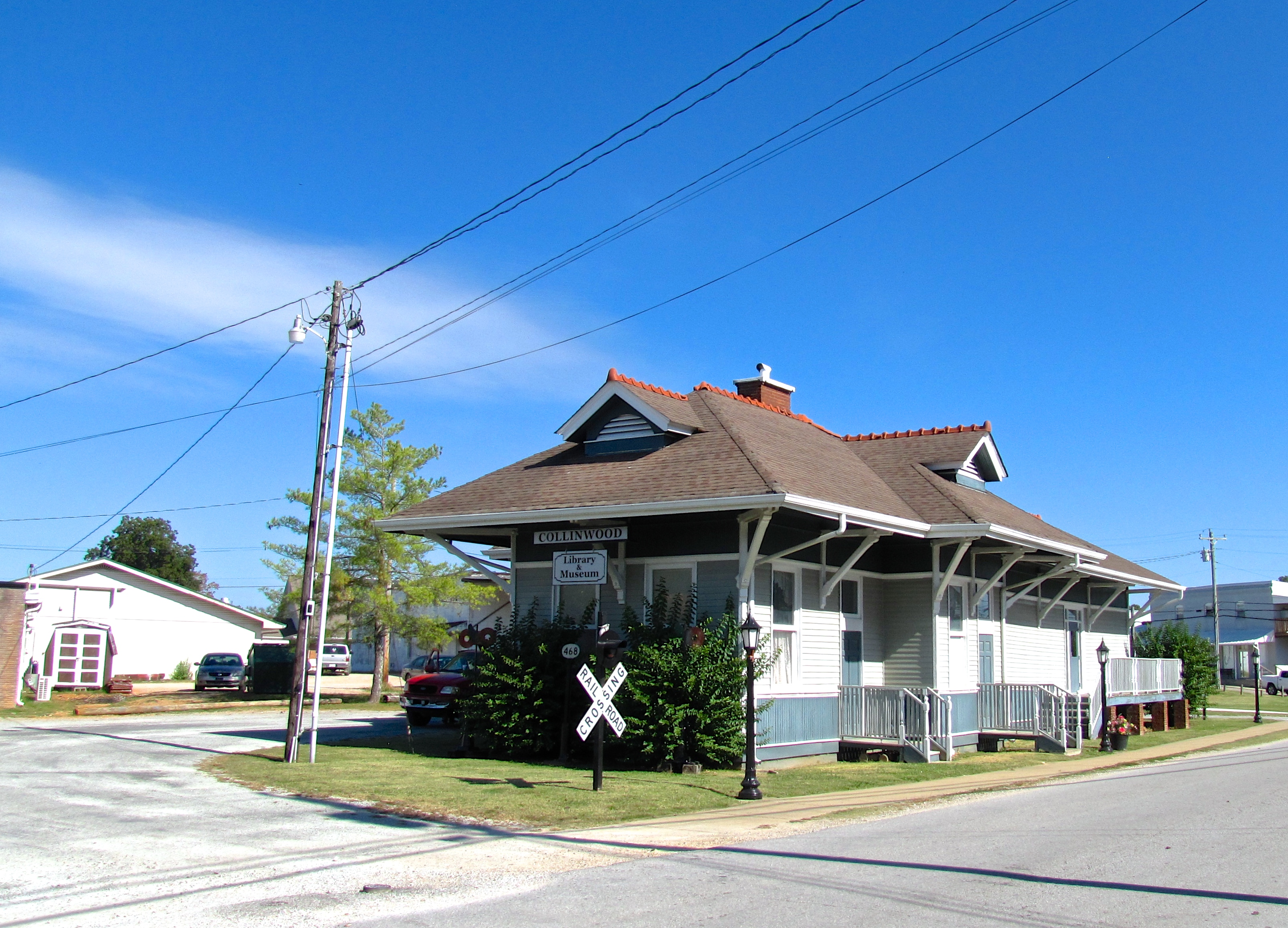
- Collinwood Railroad Station

- Flag Logo

- Location of Collinwood in Wayne County, Tennessee.
- Coordinates: 35°10′13″N 87°44′34″W
- Country: United States
- State: Tennessee
- County: Wayne
- Established: 1921

Area
  - Total: 2.78 sq mi (7.20 km^{2})
  - Land: 2.78 sq mi (7.20 km^{2})
  - Water: 0 sq mi (0.00 km^{2})
- Elevation: 1,060 ft (323 m)

Population (2020)
  - Total: 898
  - Density: 322.9/sq mi (124.68/km^{2})
- Time zone: UTC-6 (Central (CST))
  - Summer (DST): UTC-5 (CDT)
- ZIP code: 38450
- Area code: 931
- FIPS code: 47-16480
- GNIS feature ID: 1269482
- Website: www.cityofcollinwood.org

Collinwood is a city in Wayne County, Tennessee, United States. As of the 2020 census, Collinwood had a population of 898.

== History ==
Collinwood was established in 1913 as a stop on the Tennessee Western Railroad, a rail line constructed to serve the area iron industry. The city was named for W.W. Collins, president of the Collinwood Land Company, which platted the city. While the railroad, which intersected the L&N system at Iron City, was originally to extend northward to Hohenwald, plans for extension beyond Collinwood never materialized, and the city became the railroad's western terminus.

The Collinwood Land Company advertised lots for the new city in June 1913, and by the following year, about 300 people were living in the city. Most of the residents worked for the railroad or in the local lumber industry. During World War I, Collinwood's economy boomed, and its population swelled to over 2,000. A wood alcohol (methanol) distillation plant and blast furnace were constructed in the years following the war, but as demand for these products fell, the economy collapsed and the city began to decline. The tracks connecting Collinwood with the L&N system were abandoned in the late 1930s.

The Collinwood Railroad Station, built in 1916, still stands near the center of the city, and is listed on the National Register of Historic Places. The station, which mostly follows design patterns typical of L&N depots of the period, is the last major remnant of the area's railroad history. The station now serves as a library and museum.

== Geography ==
Collinwood is located at 35°10′13″N 87°44′34″W (35.170153, -87.742731). The city is situated on a relatively broad plain surrounded by low hills and hollows. Streams in the eastern part of the city are part of the Shoal Creek watershed, while streams in the western part are tributaries of Indian Creek (both Shoal Creek and Indian Creek empty into the Tennessee River).

Collinwood is concentrated along a stretch of State Route 13, roughly halfway between Waynesboro to the north and the Tennessee-Alabama state line to the south. State Route 203 intersects SR 13 at the southern tip of Collinwood, connecting the city with Savannah to the west. The Natchez Trace Parkway traverses Collinwood from northeast to southwest.

According to the United States Census Bureau, the city has a total area of 2.8 square miles (7.3 km^{2}), all of it land.

== Demographics ==
Historical population
Census	Pop.	Note	%±
1950	589		—
1960	596		1.2%
1970	922		54.7%
1980	1,064		15.4%
1990	1,014		−4.7%
2000	1,024		1.0%
2010	982		−4.1%
2020	898		−8.6%

=== 2020 census ===
As of the 2020 census, Collinwood had a population of 898, 393 households, and 298 families residing in the city. The median age was 43.3 years, with 21.0% of residents under the age of 18 and 20.9% of residents 65 years of age or older. For every 100 females there were 98.7 males, and for every 100 females age 18 and over there were 91.1 males.

0.0% of residents lived in urban areas, while 100.0% lived in rural areas.

There were 393 households in Collinwood, of which 28.5% had children under the age of 18 living in them. Of all households, 47.3% were married-couple households, 16.3% were households with a male householder and no spouse or partner present, and 31.8% were households with a female householder and no spouse or partner present. About 29.8% of all households were made up of individuals and 16.3% had someone living alone who was 65 years of age or older.

There were 437 housing units, of which 10.1% were vacant. The homeowner vacancy rate was 1.3% and the rental vacancy rate was 1.9%.

Racial composition as of the 2020 census
Race	Number	Percent
White	838	93.3%
Black or African American	0	0.0%
American Indian and Alaska Native	0	0.0%
Asian	0	0.0%
Native Hawaiian and Other Pacific Islander	0	0.0%
Some other race	24	2.7%
Two or more races	36	4.0%
Hispanic or Latino (of any race)	27	3.0%

=== 2000 census ===
As of the census of 2000, there was a population of 1,024, with 428 households and 297 families residing in the city. The population density was 365.9 inhabitants per square mile (141.3/km^{2}). There were 473 housing units at an average density of 169.0 per square mile (65.3/km^{2}). The racial makeup of the city was 98.24% White, 0.20% Native American, 0.10% Asian, 0.88% from other races, and 0.59% from two or more races. Hispanic or Latino of any race were 1.56% of the population.

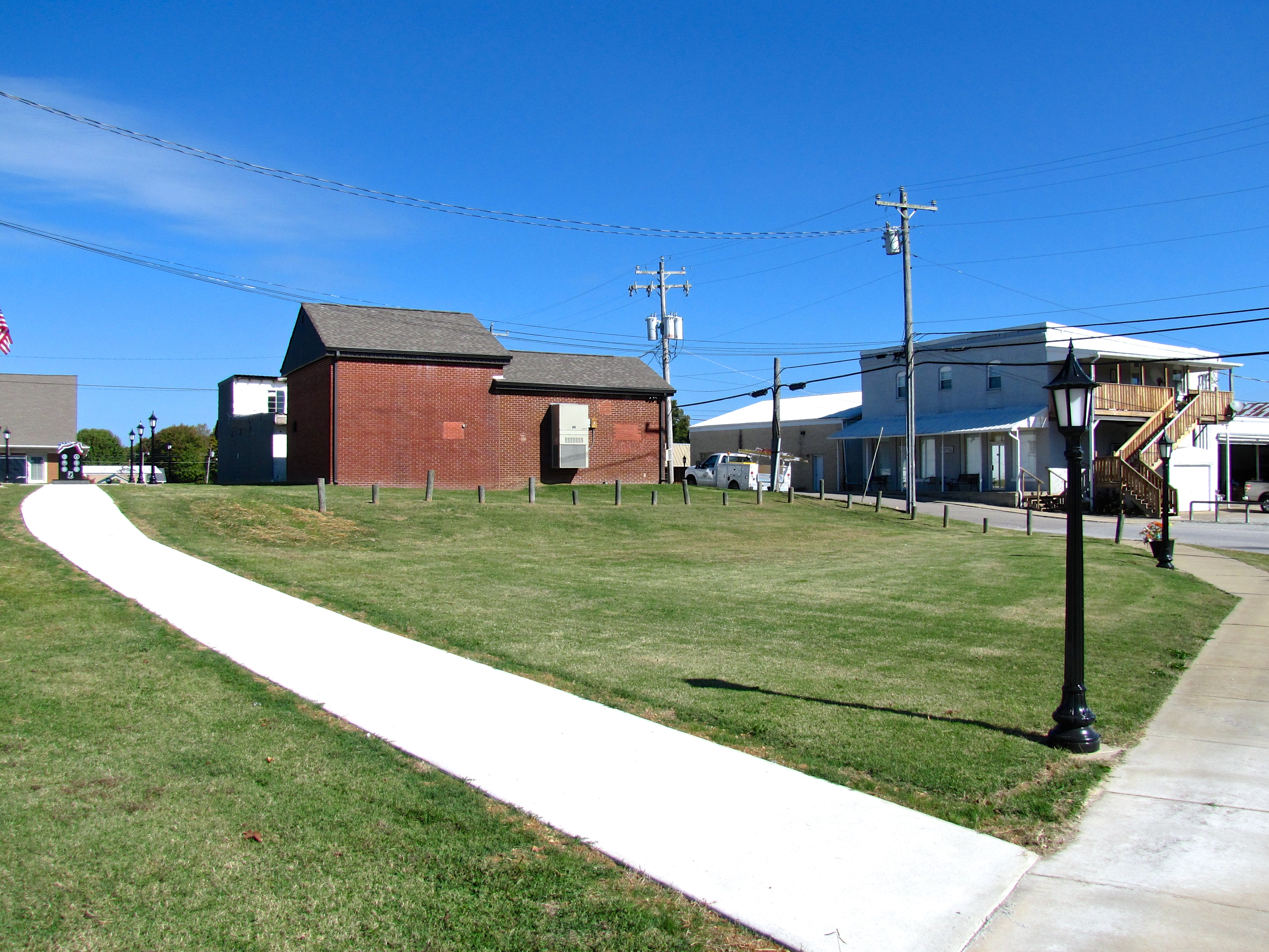
Buildings at Depot and 3rd

There were 428 households, out of which 30.6% had children under the age of 18 living with them, 52.8% were married couples living together, 13.1% had a female householder with no husband present, and 30.6% were non-families. 27.6% of all households were made up of individuals, and 13.3% had someone living alone who was 65 years of age or older. The average household size was 2.39 and the average family size was 2.88.

In the city, the population was spread out, with 23.7% under the age of 18, 10.9% from 18 to 24, 26.4% from 25 to 44, 25.1% from 45 to 64, and 13.9% who were 65 years of age or older. The median age was 38 years. For every 100 females, there were 88.6 males. For every 100 females age 18 and over, there were 86.4 males.

The median income for a household in the city was $22,305, and the median income for a family was $31,296. Males had a median income of $30,052 versus $18,269 for females. The per capita income for the city was $13,716. About 10.4% of families and 16.8% of the population were below the poverty line, including 17.2% of those under age 18 and 21.2% of those age 65 or over.

== Public spaces ==
- Ralph M. Hughes Memorial Park
- Collinwood City Park—Also known as Dixie Youth Park (Swimming, Tennis, and Baseball)
- Collinwood Depot Library/Museum
- The Natchez Trace Parkway

== Churches ==
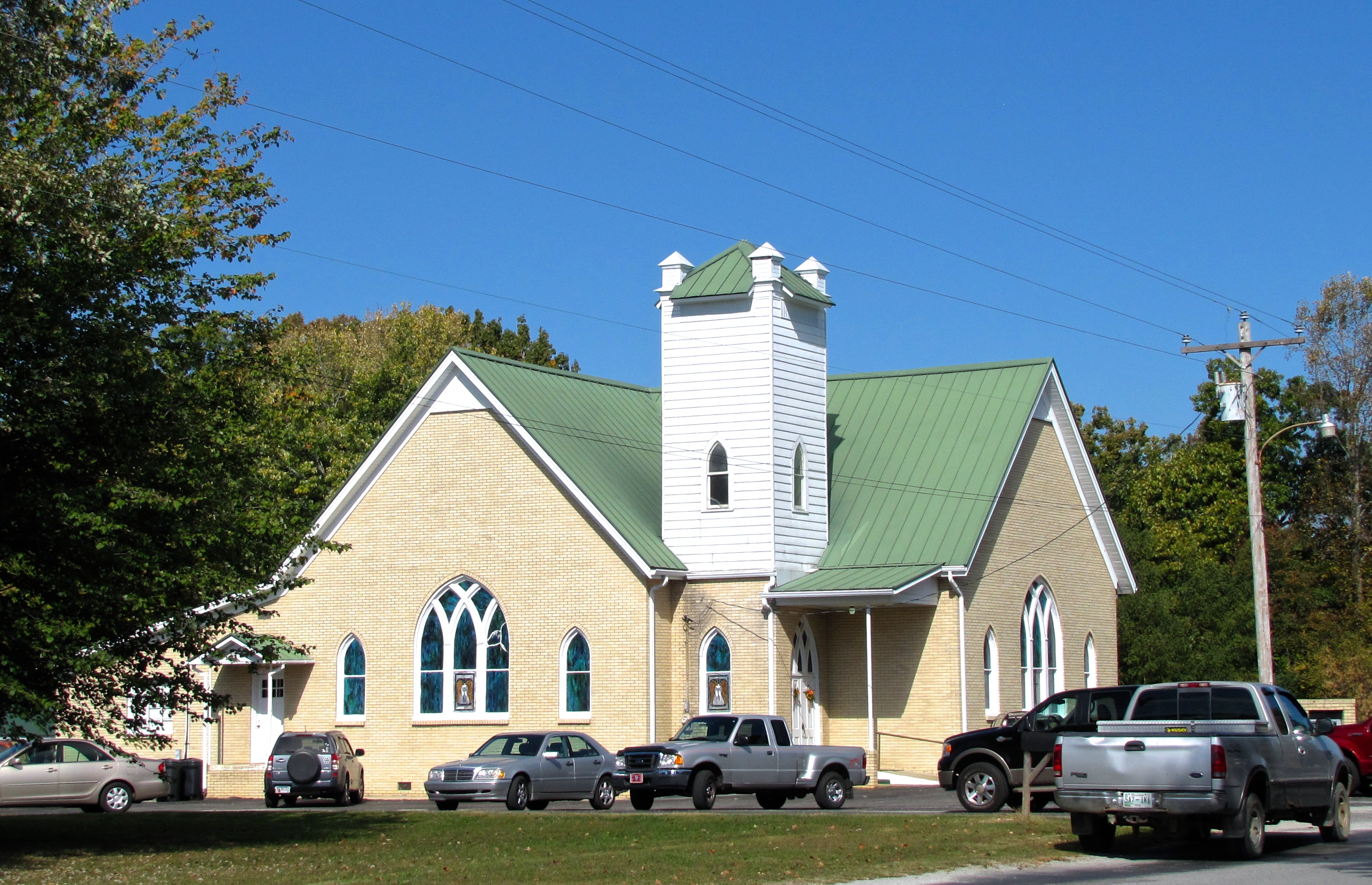
Collinwood United Methodist

This is an incomplete list of churches located in the city of Collinwood.

- Cornerstone Church of Collinwood
- Collinwood Church of God
- Collinwood Church of Christ
- Collinwood United Methodist Church
- Collinwood Free Will Baptist Church

== Education ==
- Collinwood High
- Collinwood Middle
- Collinwood Elementary
- Bevis Education Center

== Manufacturing ==
- Hassell and Hughes
- Dixie Handle Company

== Highways and parkways ==
- Natchez Trace Parkway
- Tennessee State Route 13
- Tennessee State Route 203

== Radio station ==
- FM 94.9 WMSR-FM
