= Waynesboro, Tennessee =

- City
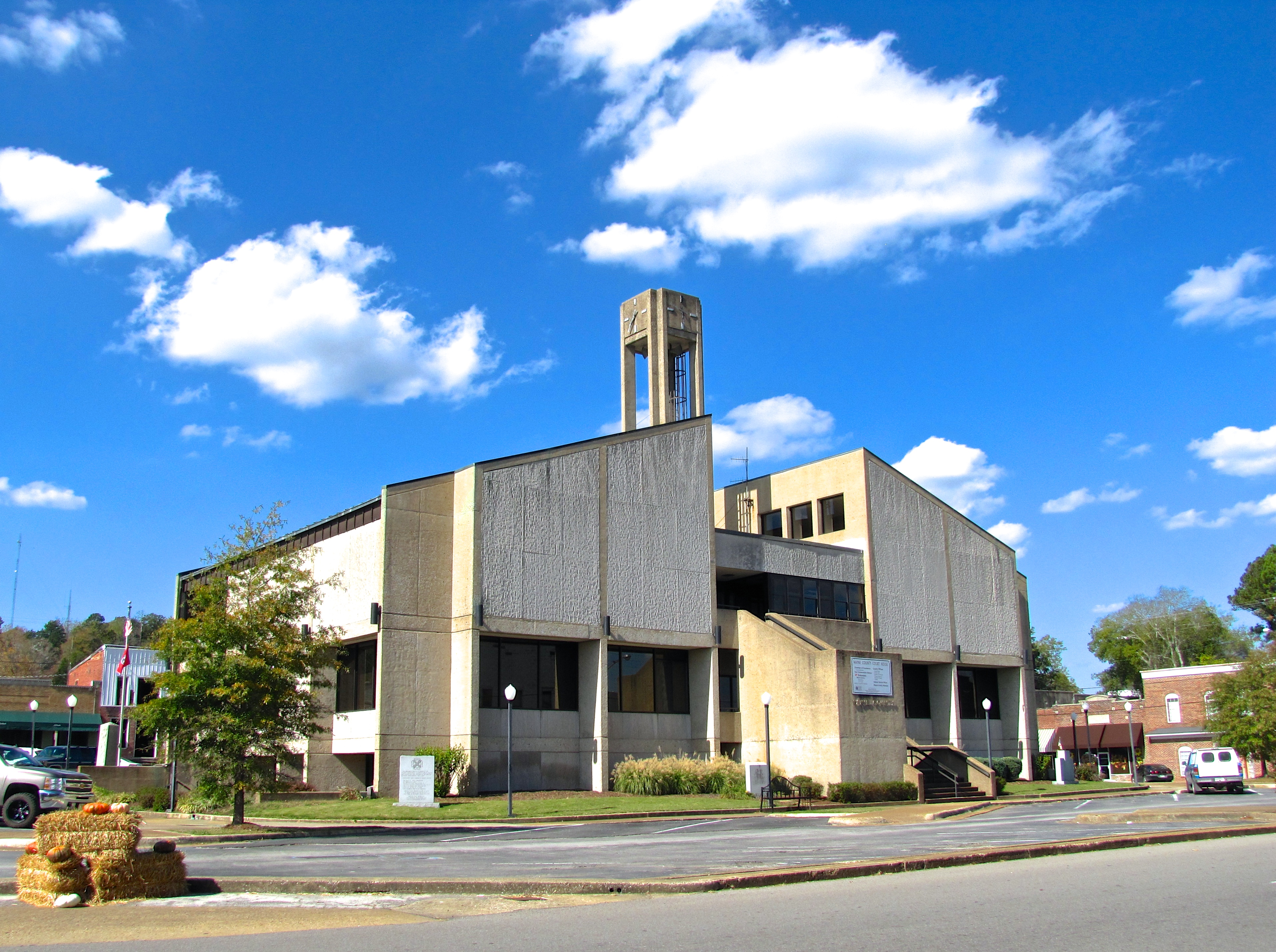
- Wayne County Courthouse in Waynesboro

- Flag Seal
- Motto: Progressing toward our future, through an understanding of our past
- Location of Waynesboro in Wayne County, Tennessee.

- Location in Tennessee Waynesboro, Tennessee (the United States)
- Coordinates: 35°19′10″N 87°45′44″W
- Country: United States
- State: Tennessee
- County: Wayne
- Established: 1821
- Incorporated: 1850
- Named after: General Anthony Wayne

Area
  - Total: 4.29 sq mi (11.10 km^{2})
  - Land: 4.29 sq mi (11.10 km^{2})
  - Water: 0 sq mi (0.00 km^{2})
- Elevation: 748 ft (228 m)

Population (2020)
  - Total: 2,317
  - Density: 540.8/sq mi (208.81/km^{2})
- Time zone: UTC-6 (Central (CST))
  - Summer (DST): UTC-5 (CDT)
- ZIP code: 38485
- Area code: 931
- FIPS code: 47-78600
- GNIS feature ID: 1326575
- Website: cityofwaynesboro.org

Waynesboro (/ˈweɪnzbʌroʊ/) is a city in and the county seat of Wayne County, Tennessee, United States. As of the 2020 census, Waynesboro had a population of 2,317.

== History ==
Waynesboro was founded in 1821 as a county seat for the newly created Wayne County. The city initially consisted of a 40-acre (16 ha) plot that included the courthouse and jail. A school, Ashland Academy, was established in 1843. The city incorporated in 1850.

== Geography ==
Waynesboro is concentrated around the junction of State Route 13 and U.S. Route 64, 105 miles (169 km) south of Nashville, and 135 miles (217 km) east of Memphis. State Route 99, which intersects US 64 in eastern Waynesboro, connects the city with Hohenwald to the northeast. The Natchez Trace Parkway intersects US 64 a few miles east of Waynesboro.

Waynesboro lies along the banks of the Green River, which slices a narrow valley oriented north-to-south en route to its mouth along the Buffalo River to the north. Hurricane Creek, which approaches from the southeast, empties into the Green River just north of the city. Much of the forest northwest of Waynesboro is part of the Eagle Creek Wildlife Management Area.

According to the United States Census Bureau, the city has a total area of 2.5 square miles (6.5 km^{2}), all of it land.

=== Climate ===
Climate data for Waynesboro, Tennessee (1991–2020 normals, extremes 1893–present)
Month	Jan	Feb	Mar	Apr	May	Jun	Jul	Aug	Sep	Oct	Nov	Dec	Year
Record high °F (°C)	79 (26)	82 (28)	91 (33)	92 (33)	96 (36)	106 (41)	108 (42)	106 (41)	107 (42)	96 (36)	86 (30)	76 (24)	108 (42)
Mean daily maximum °F (°C)	48.9 (9.4)	53.2 (11.8)	62.0 (16.7)	71.9 (22.2)	78.6 (25.9)	85.3 (29.6)	88.4 (31.3)	88.2 (31.2)	83.1 (28.4)	73.1 (22.8)	60.9 (16.1)	51.7 (10.9)	70.4 (21.3)
Daily mean °F (°C)	37.8 (3.2)	41.2 (5.1)	48.8 (9.3)	57.7 (14.3)	65.9 (18.8)	73.7 (23.2)	77.2 (25.1)	76.2 (24.6)	70.0 (21.1)	59.0 (15.0)	47.7 (8.7)	40.5 (4.7)	58.0 (14.4)
Mean daily minimum °F (°C)	26.7 (−2.9)	29.3 (−1.5)	35.7 (2.1)	43.4 (6.3)	53.1 (11.7)	62.1 (16.7)	65.9 (18.8)	64.1 (17.8)	56.8 (13.8)	44.9 (7.2)	34.4 (1.3)	29.4 (−1.4)	45.5 (7.5)
Record low °F (°C)	−21 (−29)	−20 (−29)	2 (−17)	19 (−7)	27 (−3)	34 (1)	41 (5)	41 (5)	29 (−2)	16 (−9)	−5 (−21)	−9 (−23)	−21 (−29)
Average precipitation inches (mm)	4.99 (127)	5.61 (142)	5.56 (141)	5.59 (142)	5.83 (148)	5.27 (134)	5.36 (136)	4.43 (113)	4.38 (111)	4.40 (112)	4.19 (106)	6.18 (157)	61.79 (1,569)
Average snowfall inches (cm)	0.4 (1.0)	0.4 (1.0)	0.5 (1.3)	0.0 (0.0)	0.0 (0.0)	0.0 (0.0)	0.0 (0.0)	0.0 (0.0)	0.0 (0.0)	0.0 (0.0)	0.0 (0.0)	0.0 (0.0)	1.3 (3.3)
Average precipitation days (≥ 0.01 in)	11.1	10.4	11.8	10.2	10.6	10.5	10.0	9.1	7.9	7.9	9.2	11.4	120.1
Average snowy days (≥ 0.1 in)	0.5	0.7	0.2	0.0	0.0	0.0	0.0	0.0	0.0	0.0	0.0	0.2	1.6
Source: NOAA

== Demographics ==
Historical population
Census	Pop.	Note	%±
1880	236		—
1890	239		1.3%
1910	357		—
1940	768		—
1950	1,147		49.3%
1960	1,343		17.1%
1970	1,983		47.7%
1980	2,109		6.4%
1990	1,824		−13.5%
2000	2,228		22.1%
2010	2,449		9.9%
2020	2,317		−5.4%

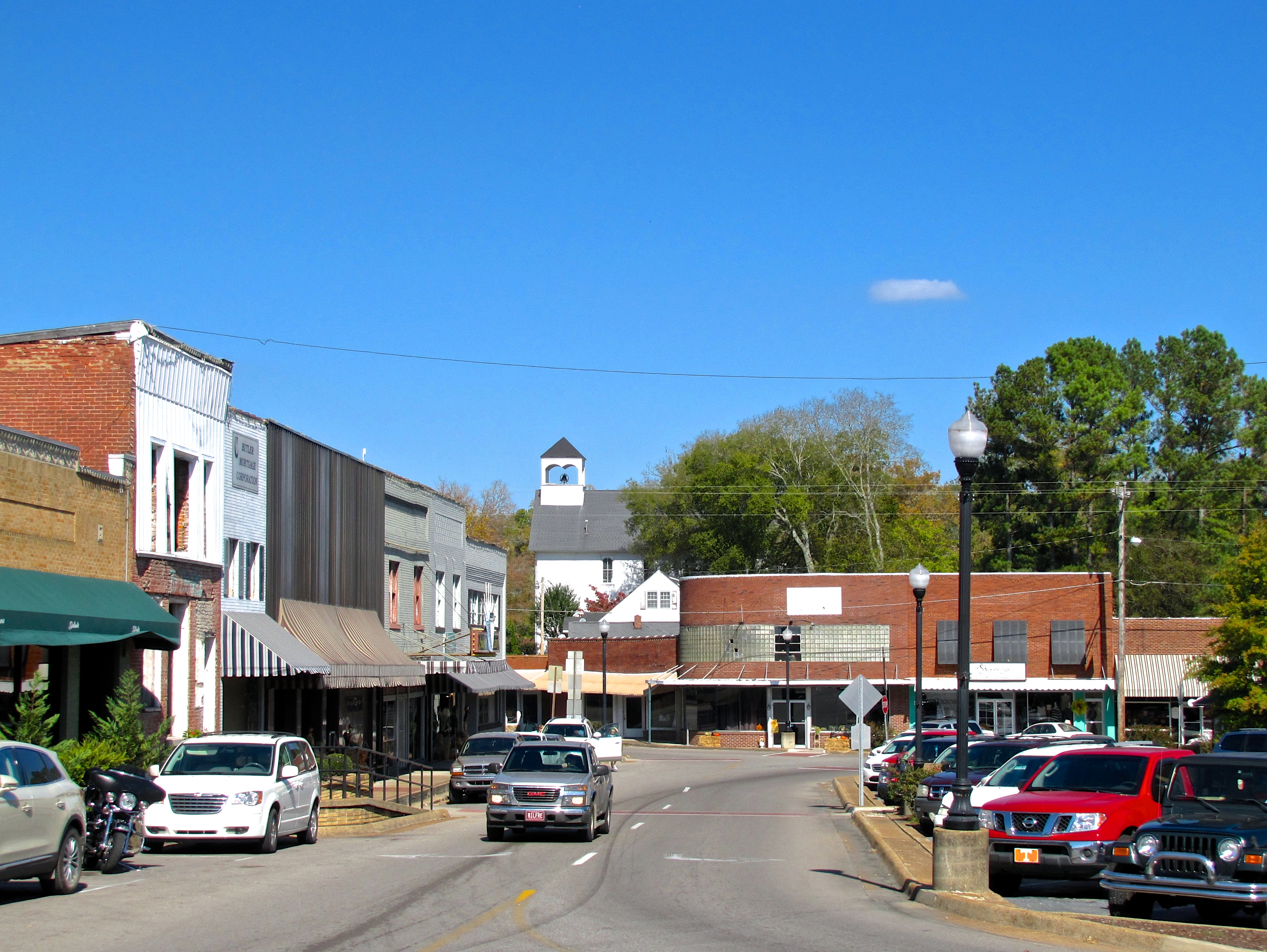
Buildings along the courthouse square

=== 2020 census ===
Racial composition as of the 2020 census
Race	Number	Percent
White	2,140	92.4%
Black or African American	54	2.3%
American Indian and Alaska Native	4	0.2%
Asian	14	0.6%
Native Hawaiian and Other Pacific Islander	0	0.0%
Some other race	44	1.9%
Two or more races	61	2.6%
Hispanic or Latino (of any race)	49	2.1%

As of the 2020 census, Waynesboro had a population of 2,317, with 957 households and 655 families residing in the city. The median age was 44.4 years, with 19.6% of residents under the age of 18 and 25.7% of residents 65 years of age or older. For every 100 females there were 93.1 males, and for every 100 females age 18 and over there were 86.2 males age 18 and over. 0.0% of residents lived in urban areas, while 100.0% lived in rural areas.

There were 957 households in Waynesboro, of which 26.1% had children under the age of 18 living in them. Of all households, 36.4% were married-couple households, 19.2% were households with a male householder and no spouse or partner present, and 39.3% were households with a female householder and no spouse or partner present. About 39.7% of all households were made up of individuals and 22.0% had someone living alone who was 65 years of age or older.

There were 1,124 housing units, of which 14.9% were vacant. The homeowner vacancy rate was 4.5% and the rental vacancy rate was 8.1%.

=== 2000 census ===
As of the census of 2000, there was a population of 2,228, with 954 households and 601 families residing in the city. The population density was 904.2 inhabitants per square mile (349.1/km^{2}). There were 1,071 housing units at an average density of 434.7 per square mile (167.8/km^{2}). The racial makeup of the city was 97.04% White, 1.39% African American, 0.22% Native American, 0.45% Asian, 0.09% Pacific Islander, 0.22% from other races, and 0.58% from two or more races. Hispanic or Latino of any race were 1.03% of the population.

There were 954 households, out of which 27.7% had children under the age of 18 living with them, 47.1% were married couples living together, 13.1% had a female householder with no husband present, and 37.0% were non-families. 35.1% of all households were made up of individuals, and 18.3% had someone living alone who was 65 years of age or older. The average household size was 2.21 and the average family size was 2.84.

In the city, the population was spread out, with 23.1% under the age of 18, 7.7% from 18 to 24, 25.9% from 25 to 44, 23.4% from 45 to 64, and 19.9% who were 65 years of age or older. The median age was 40 years. For every 100 females, there were 87.1 males. For every 100 females age 18 and over, there were 79.6 males.

The median income for a household in the city was $25,196, and the median income for a family was $33,917. Males had a median income of $27,263 versus $17,379 for females. The per capita income for the city was $15,037. About 14.0% of families and 16.3% of the population were below the poverty line, including 16.9% of those under age 18 and 15.2% of those age 65 or over.

== Education ==
- Waynesboro Elementary School
- Waynesboro Middle School
- Wayne County High School
- Wayne County Technology Center
- Hollis Academy

== Media ==
=== Radio stations ===
- WWON Big Oldies 930
- W210BE 89.9 American Family Radio
- WWON-FM 100.7.

== Infrastructure ==
=== Highways ===
- US 64 / SR 15
- SR 13
- SR 99

== Notable people ==
- Clay Allison, Old West gun fighter
- Mark Collie, country music singer
- Greg Seitz, director of athletics, Jacksonville State University
