= Collinwood High School =

Collinwood High School may refer to:

- Collinwood High School (Cleveland), in Ohio, United States
- Collinwood High School (Tennessee), United States
