= Sam Phillips (record producer) =

American disc jockey, songwriter and record producer (1923–2003)

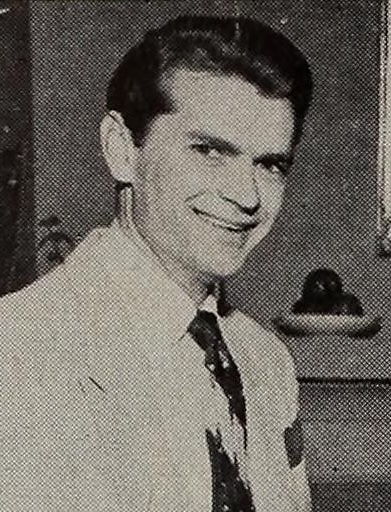
- Phillips in 1955

Background information
- Born: Samuel Cornelius Phillips; January 5, 1923; Florence, Alabama, U.S.
- Died: July 30, 2003 (aged 80) Memphis, Tennessee, U.S.
- Genres: Rock and roll; rock; rockabilly; R&B; country; blues; pop; jazz; soul; doo-wop; boogie woogie
- Occupations: Disc jockey; songwriter; record producer
- Years active: 1945–2003
- Labels: Phillips International; Sun

Samuel Cornelius Phillips (January 5, 1923 – July 30, 2003) was an American disc jockey, songwriter, and record producer. He was the founder of Sun Records and Sun Studio in Memphis, Tennessee, where he produced recordings by Elvis Presley, Roy Orbison, Jerry Lee Lewis, Carl Perkins, Johnny Cash, and Howlin' Wolf. Phillips played a major role in the development of rock and roll during the 1950s, including launching Presley's career. In 1969, he sold Sun to Shelby Singleton.

Phillips was the owner and operator of radio stations in Memphis; Florence, Alabama; and Lake Worth Beach, Florida. He was also an early investor in the Holiday Inn chain of hotels and an advocate for racial equality, helping to break down racial barriers in the music industry.

== Early life ==
Phillips was the youngest of eight children, born on a 200-acre farm near Florence, Alabama, to Madge Ella (née Lovelace) and Charles Tucker Phillips. Sam's parents owned their farm, though it was mortgaged. As a child, he picked cotton in the fields with his parents alongside black laborers. The experience of hearing black laborers singing in the fields left a big impression on the young Phillips. Traveling through Memphis with his family in 1939 on the way to see a preacher in Dallas, he slipped off to look at Beale Street, at the time the heart of the city's music scene. "I just fell totally in love," he later recalled.

Phillips attended the now-defunct Coffee High School in Florence. He conducted the school band and had ambitions to be a criminal defense attorney. His father was bankrupt by the Great Depression and died in 1941, though, forcing Phillips to leave high school to look after his mother and aunt. To support the family, he worked in a grocery store and then a funeral parlor.

In 1942, Sam, 19, met Rebecca "Becky" Burns, 17, his future wife, while they were both working at WLAY radio station in Sheffield, Alabama. He was an announcer and she was still in high school and had a radio segment with her sister as the Kitchen Sisters, where they played music and sang. A January 18, 2013, article in the Alabama Chanin Journal honoring Becky quoted Sam as saying, "I fell in love with Becky's voice even before I met her." Becky described her first encounter with Sam to journalist Peter Guralnick: "He had just come in out of the rain. His hair was windblown and full of raindrops. He wore sandals and a smile unlike any I had ever seen. He sat down on the piano bench and began to talk to me. I told my family that night that I had met the man I wanted to marry." They wed in 1943 and went on to have two children in a marriage that, although full of extramarital affairs on Sam's part, never ended. Becky Phillips died in 2012, aged 87.

== The Memphis Recording Service and Sun Records ==
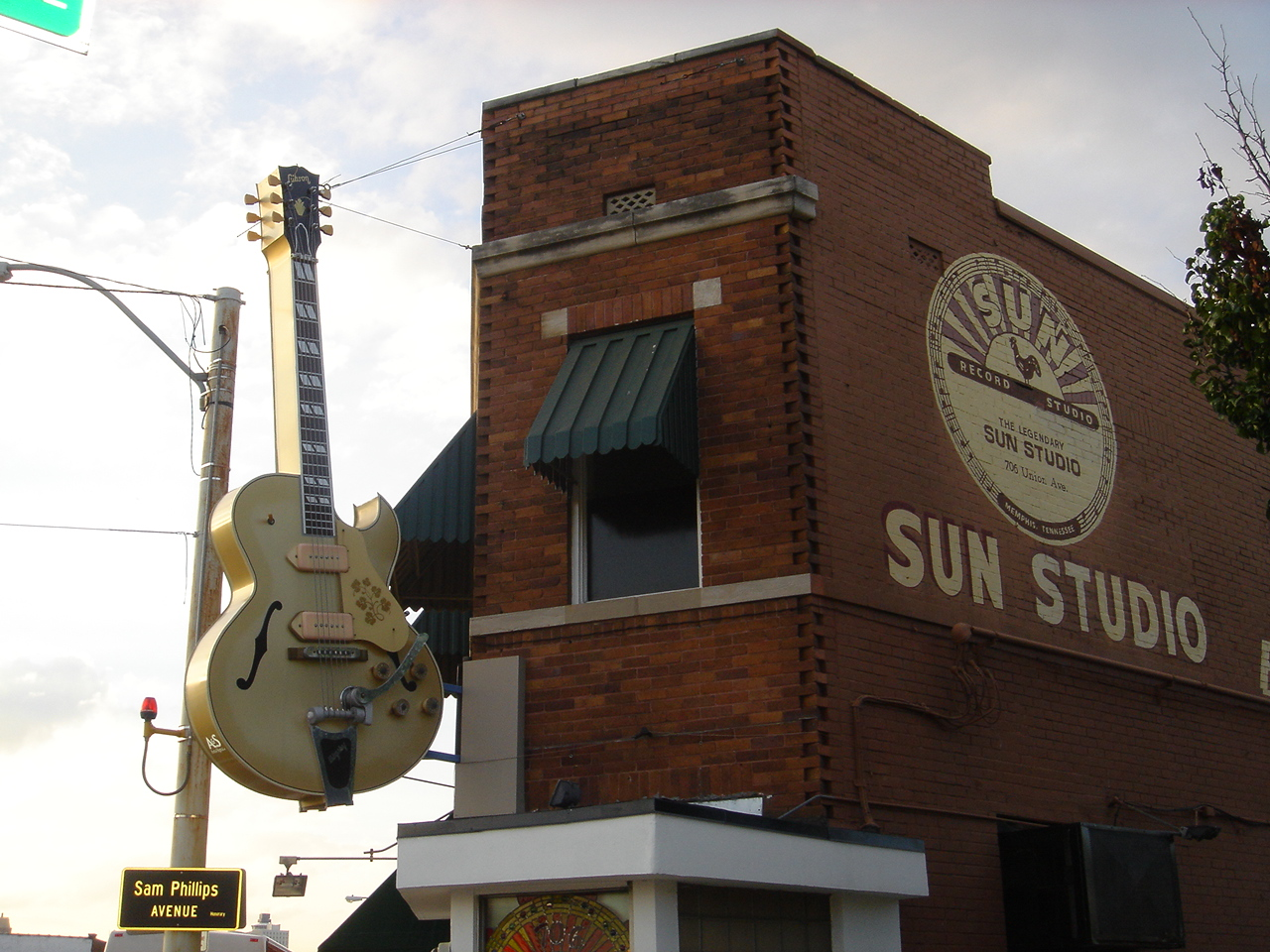
Sun Studio, 706 Union Avenue, Memphis

In the 1940s, Phillips worked as a DJ and radio engineer for station WLAY (AM), in Muscle Shoals, Alabama. According to Phillips, the station's "open format" (of broadcasting music by white and black musicians alike) would later inspire his work in Memphis. Beginning in 1945, he worked for four years as an announcer and sound engineer for radio station WREC in Memphis.

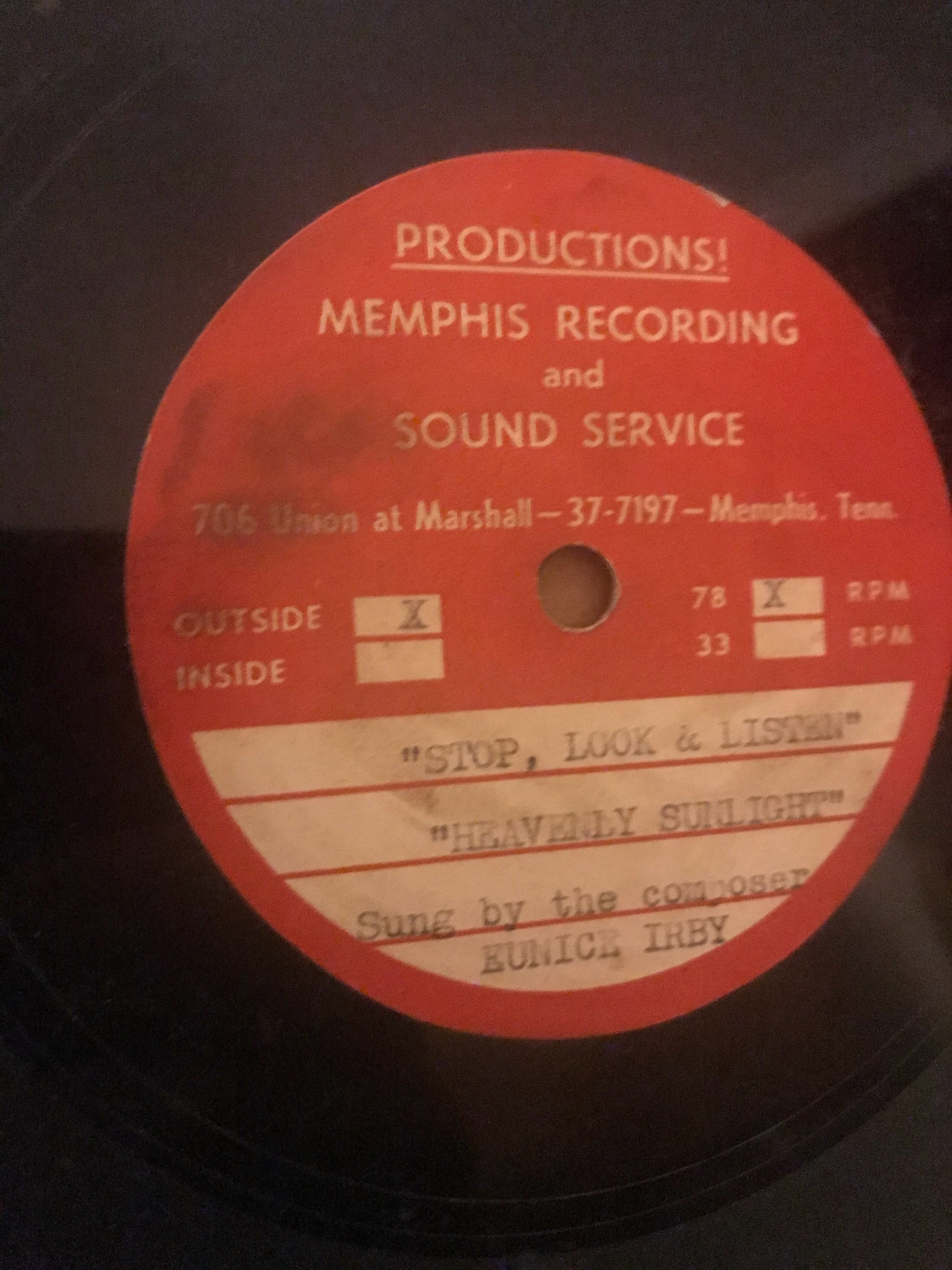
A 78 rpm demo record from Sam Phillips' studio in Memphis

On January 3, 1950, Phillips opened the Memphis Recording Service at 706 Union Avenue in Memphis. He let amateurs record, which drew performers such as B. B. King, Junior Parker, and Howlin' Wolf, who made their first recordings there. Phillips then sold the recordings to larger labels to distribute them.

Phillips recorded what the music historian Peter Guralnick considered the first rock-and-roll record: "Rocket 88", by Jackie Brenston and his Delta Cats, a band led by then-19-year-old Ike Turner, who also wrote the song. The recording was released in 1951 by Chess Records in Chicago. From 1950 to 1954, Phillips recorded music by James Cotton, Rufus Thomas, Rosco Gordon, Little Milton, Bobby Blue Bland, the Prisonaires, and others.

The Memphis Recording Service also served as the studio for Phillips's own label, Sun Record Company, which he launched in 1952. Sun Records produced more rock-and-roll records than any other record label of its time during its 16-year run, producing 226 singles. Phillips recorded different styles of music, but he was interested in the blues: "The blues, it got people—black and white—to think about life, how difficult, yet also how good it can be. They would sing about it; they would pray about it; they would preach about it. This is how they relieved the burden of what existed day in and day out."

In addition to musical performances, in his early career Phillips recorded events such as weddings and funerals, selling the recordings.

== Elvis Presley, Johnny Cash, Jerry Lee Lewis, Carl Perkins, Roy Orbison ==
Phillips and Elvis Presley opened a new form of music. Phillips said of Presley: "Elvis cut a ballad, which was just excellent. I could tell you, both Elvis and Roy Orbison could tear a ballad to pieces. But I said to myself, 'You can't do that, Sam.' If I had released a ballad, I don't think you would have heard of Elvis Presley."

Phillips stated of his goals, "everyone knew that I was just a struggling cat down here trying to develop new and different artists, and get some freedom in music, and tap some resources and people that weren't being tapped."

Phillips met Presley through the mediation of his longtime collaborator at the Memphis Recording Service, Marion Keisker, who was already a well-known Memphis radio personality. On July 18, 1953, 18-year-old Presley dropped into the studio to record an acetate; Keisker thought she heard some talent in the young truckdriver's voice, so she turned on the tape recorder. Later, she played it for Phillips, who with Keisker's encouragement, gradually warmed to the idea of recording Elvis.

Presley, who recorded his version of Arthur "Big Boy" Crudup's "That's All Right" at Phillips's studio, became highly successful, first in Memphis, then throughout the Southern United States. He auditioned for Phillips in 1954, but Phillips was not impressed until Elvis sang "That's All Right (Mama)". He brought the song to Dewey Phillips, a disc jockey at WHBQ 560, to play on his Red, Hot and Blue program. For the first six months, the flip side, "Blue Moon of Kentucky", Presley's upbeat version of a Bill Monroe bluegrass song, was slightly more popular than "That's All Right (Mama)". While still not known outside the South, Presley's singles and regional success became a drawing card for Sun Records, as singing hopefuls soon arrived from all over the region. Singers such as Sonny Burgess ("My Bucket's Got a Hole in It"), Charlie Rich, Junior Parker, and Billy Lee Riley recorded for Sun with some success, and others, such as Jerry Lee Lewis, B. B. King, Johnny Cash, Roy Orbison, and Carl Perkins, became stars.

Phillips's pivotal role in the early days of rock and roll was exemplified by a celebrated jam session on December 4, 1956, with what became known as the Million Dollar Quartet. Jerry Lee Lewis was playing piano for a Carl Perkins recording session at Phillips's studio. When Elvis Presley walked in unexpectedly, Johnny Cash was called into the studio by Phillips, leading to an impromptu session featuring the four musicians. Phillips challenged the four to achieve gold record sales, offering a free Cadillac to the first, which Carl Perkins won. The contest is commemorated in a song by the Drive-By Truckers.

By the mid-1960s, Phillips rarely recorded. He built a satellite studio and opened radio stations, but the studio declined, and he sold Sun Records to Shelby Singleton in 1969. In 1977, Sam's sons, Knox and Jerry, were working with John Prine at the Phillips Recording Studio when Sam Phillips joined them to oversee recordings that were eventually included on the album Pink Cadillac.

== WHER ==
Phillips launched radio station WHER on October 29, 1955. Each of the young women who auditioned for the station assumed only one female announcer position was available, as was the case with other stations at that time. Only a few days before the first broadcast did they learn of the all-female format. It was the first all-female radio station in the United States, as almost every position at the station was held by a woman.

== Other business interests ==
Through shrewd investments, Phillips amassed a fortune. He was one of the first investors in Holiday Inn, a motel chain that was about to expand to a nationwide franchise; he became involved with the chain shortly after selling Elvis Presley's contract to RCA, for $35,000, which he multiplied many times over the years with Holiday Inn. He also created two subsidiary recording labels, Phillips International Records and Holiday Inn Records. He also owned the Sun Studio Café in Memphis. One location was in the Mall of Memphis.

Phillips and his family founded Big River Broadcasting Corporation, which owns and operates several radio stations in the Florence, Alabama, area, including WQLT-FM, WSBM, and WXFL. He also established radio station WLIZ in Lake Worth, Florida, in 1959.

== Accolades ==
In 1986, Phillips was part of the first group inducted into the Rock and Roll Hall of Fame, and his pioneering contribution to the genre has been recognized by the Rockabilly Hall of Fame. He was the first nonperformer inducted. In 1987, he was inducted into the Alabama Music Hall of Fame. He received a Grammy Trustees Award for lifetime achievement in 1991. In 1998, he was inducted into the Blues Hall of Fame, in October 2001 he was inducted into the Country Music Hall of Fame, and in 2012, he was inducted into the inaugural class of the Memphis Music Hall of Fame.

== Later years and death ==
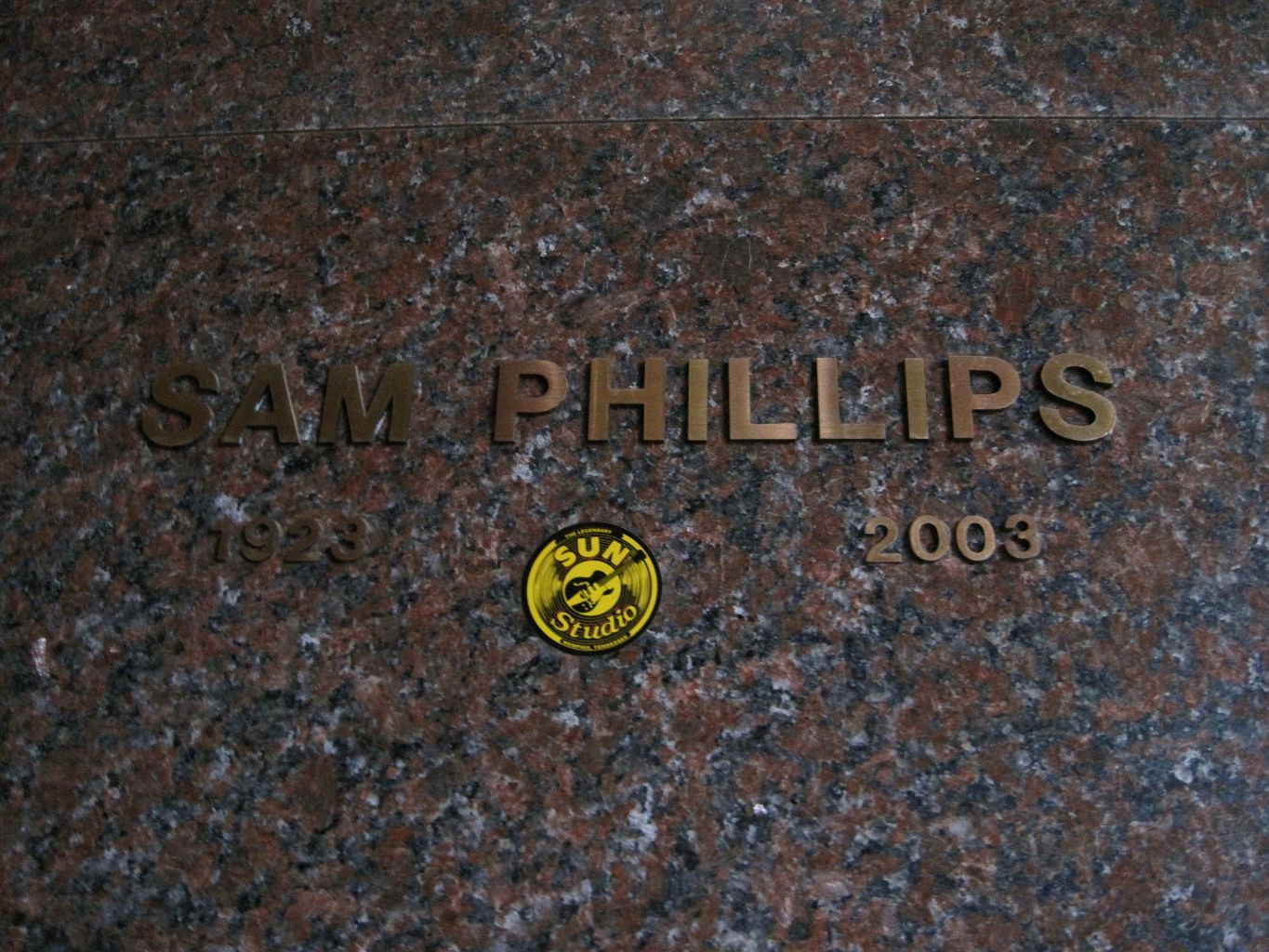
Phillips' grave at the Memorial Park Cemetery in Memphis, Tennessee

Phillips died of respiratory failure, aged 80, at St. Francis Hospital in Memphis, on July 30, 2003, only one day before the original Sun Studio was designated a National Historic Landmark. Phillips is interred in the Memorial Park Cemetery in Memphis.

== Notable portrayals ==
- Charles Cyphers portrayed Phillips in the 1979 ABC television drama Elvis, starring Kurt Russell in the title role. The program aired on February 11, 1979.
- Paul Eiding played the role of Phillips in the 1986 Twilight Zone episode "The Once and Future King".
- Trey Wilson portrayed Phillips in Great Balls of Fire!, a biopic about Jerry Lee Lewis released in June 1989.
- Phillips was portrayed by Gregory Itzin in the penultimate 1993 Quantum Leap episode, "Memphis Melody".
- Phillips was portrayed by Dallas Roberts in the 2005 film Walk the Line.
- Phillips was portrayed by Tim Guinee in the 2005 CBS miniseries Elvis.
- On October 21, 2016, Leonardo DiCaprio was announced to portray Sam Phillips in the forthcoming film based on Peter Guralnick's book, Sam Phillips: The Man Who Invented Rock 'n' Roll.
- Phillips was portrayed by Chad Michael Murray in the 2017 CMT drama series Sun Records.
- Philips was portrayed by Josh McConville in the 2022 Elvis Presley biopic Elvis.
