= WQLT-FM =

- Florence, Alabama; United States
- Broadcast area: Florence-Muscle Shoals Metropolitan Area
- Frequency: 107.3 MHz
- Branding: Q107

Programming
- Format: Adult hits
- Affiliations: Fox News Radio; Tennessee Titans Radio Network

Ownership
- Owner: Big River Broadcasting Corporation
- Sister stations: WSBM, WXFL, WLVS-FM

History
- First air date: August 8, 1962 (as WOWL-FM)
- Former call signs: WOWL-FM (1962–1965); WJOI-FM (1965–1967); WQLT (1967–1978)

Technical information
- Licensing authority: FCC
- Facility ID: 5274
- Class: C1
- ERP: 93,000 watts
- HAAT: 310 meters (1017 feet)
- Transmitter coordinates: 34°40′24″N 87°42′56″W
- Translator: 106.9 W295AE (Trinity)

Links
- Public license information: Public file; LMS
- Webcast: Listen Live
- Website: wqlt.com

WQLT-FM (107.3 MHz, "Q107") is a commercial FM radio station licensed to Florence, Alabama, United States. The station airs an adult hits radio format, with a heavy emphasis on oldies. It is owned by the Big River Broadcasting Corporation and is operated by the family of noted record producer Sam Phillips, a native of Florence. The studios and offices are located on Sam Phillips Street in Florence.

WQLT's transmitter is located off New Cut Road in Tuscumbia, Alabama. With an effective radiated power (ERP) of 93,000 watts and a height above average terrain (HAAT) of 1,017 feet, WQLT's signal can be heard throughout Northwest Alabama, Northeast Mississippi, and South-Central Tennessee.

== Programming ==
WQLT-FM broadcasts a wide range of classic hits, mixing both current and classic adult contemporary and adult hits music. In addition to its usual music programming, WQLT-FM is an affiliate of the Tennessee Titans football radio network. It also carries news updates from Fox News Radio. Its current on-air lineup includes Your Morning Show with David Havens, Middays with River Jones, Afternoons with Chip Valentine, and nights with Nina Jackson. The station also runs "Funkadelic Friday" on Friday Nights, "Saturday Night At The Oldies" on Saturday Nights, and "Radio Therapy with Henry Green" on Sunday Nights.

== History ==
This station began regular broadcasting on August 8, 1962, with 4,600 watts of effective radiated power on 107.3 MHz as WOWL-FM. Owned by Radio Muscle Shoals, Inc., it was the FM sister station of AM 1240 WOWL (now WBCF).

On August 15, 1965, the station began broadcasting with 25,000 watts of effective radiated power as WJOI-FM. Owned by WJOI Radio, Inc., it was the FM sister station of WJOI (1340 AM, now known as WSBM). On May 29, 1967, the station's call letters were changed again, this time to WQLT.

WQLT and its AM sister were acquired by Big River Broadcasting Corporation on February 21, 1973. Big River Broadcasting is owned by the family of Sam Phillips, the legendary record producer and Rock and Roll Hall of Fame member most notable for founding Sun Records and discovering Elvis Presley.

The station's signal was boosted to 100,000 watts in 1978 and the station was assigned the current WQLT-FM call letters by the Federal Communications Commission on December 1, 1978. This was the first regional top-40 station to serve the entirety of North Alabama and forced several AMs in the area to change format. Q-107's original line-up offered six-hour shifts featuring George Bryant 6 AM to Noon, Maury Buchanan Noon to 6PM, Steve Jefferies 6PM to Midnight, Kerry Mitchell Midnight to 6AM. Weekends Featured Booker T. Ken Maynor hosted Saturday Night at the Oldies for many years. Bill Reeves served as Operations Manager and Production Director. Al Hammond was news director.

== Translators ==
WQLT-FM's programming is also carried on a broadcast translator station to extend or improve the coverage area of the station.

Call sign	Frequency	City of license	FID	ERP (W)	Class	FCC info
W295AE	106.9 FM	Trinity, Alabama	5277	250	D	LMS
