= Frank Hughes College =

- Motto: "Ninety-eight percent of hard work and inspiration is usually only another word for perspiration." - Edison.
- Established: 1905
- President: J. Thompson Baker, B.L., PH.M.
- Location: Clifton, Tennessee, USA
- Campus: 7 acres
- Mascot: Lions

Frank Hughes School

Location
- 444 Main Street; Clifton, Wayne County, Tennessee, Tennessee, 38425; United States; 35.3821°N 87.9938°W

Information
- School type: Public, Public
- Opened: 1905
- School board: Wayne County School Board
- School district: Wayne County Schools
- Principal: Mike Maples
- Faculty: 38
- Grades: PK-12
- Campus size: 7 Acres
- Athletics conference: TSSAA

Frank Hughes College, now Frank Hughes School began as a consolidated private educational institution in Clifton, Tennessee in September 1905. It is currently part of the Wayne County School system.

== History ==
Frank Hughes College was established in memory of a young boy who was killed in a hunting accident in 1904. The school began as a grade school, secondary school, and a college, all in one facility. By 1909, there were students from several states attending the college and boarding at private homes in the town. The college portion was phased out in the late 1920s after steamboat travel began to change to automobiles. The original building was demolished in 1976.

== Athletics ==
In 1986, the FHS girls basketball team had a 35–3 win/loss record and won the class A State championship.
