= WXFL =

- Florence, Alabama; United States
- Broadcast area: Tennessee Valley
- Frequency: 96.1 MHz
- Branding: KIX 96

Programming
- Format: Country
- Affiliations: Fox News Radio

Ownership
- Owner: Big River Broadcasting
- Sister stations: WQLT-FM, WSBM, WLVS-FM

History
- First air date: February 1992
- Call sign meaning: Florence

Technical information
- Licensing authority: FCC
- Facility ID: 4470
- Class: C2
- ERP: 20,500 watts
- HAAT: 238 meters (781 ft)
- Transmitter coordinates: 34°54′17″N 87°24′02″W

Links
- Public license information: Public file; LMS
- Webcast: Listen live
- Website: kix96country.com

WXFL (96.1 FM, "KIX 96") is a country music-formatted radio station based in Florence, Alabama, United States and owned by Big River Broadcasting, a company established by legendary rock and roll music producer Sam Phillips. WXFL serves Florence and the Tennessee Valley with an ERP of 20,500 watts.

This station has held the WXFL call sign since 1990. Television station WFLA-TV in Tampa, Florida held this call sign from 1983 to 1989.

WXFL has a simulcast partner, WLVS-FM, in Clifton, Tennessee, which broadcasts on 106.5 FM. WXFL can also be heard globally through its online audio stream.

== Programming ==
WXFL is the home for the "Mountain Dew NASCAR Update," which covers NASCAR news and talk.

Special programming includes "Big Farley's Country Underground" from 9am to noon on Saturdays, "Rockin' Country Saturday Night" with M. Fletcher Brown from 6pm to midnight, and "Sunday Night Country Classics" with Sherry St. John.

Regular weekday programming includes Big Farley from 5am to 10am, Sherry St. John from 10am to 2pm, M. Fletcher Brown from 2pm to 6pm, and Backstage Country from 6pm to midnight.

WXFL and its sister station, WQLT-FM, are also affiliates of Fox News Radio.
