= WSBM =

- Florence, Alabama; United States
- Broadcast area: Florence–Muscle Shoals, Alabama
- Frequency: 1340 kHz
- Branding: Fox Sports Shoals

Programming
- Format: Sports
- Affiliations: Fox Sports Radio

Ownership
- Owner: Big River Broadcasting Corporation
- Sister stations: WQLT-FM, WXFL, WLVS-FM

History
- First air date: March 29, 1946 (as WJOI)
- Former call signs: WJOI (1946–1973); WXOR (1973–1984)
- Call sign meaning: Sports Beats Music

Technical information
- Licensing authority: FCC
- Facility ID: 5272
- Class: C
- Power: 1,000 watts unlimited
- Transmitter coordinates: 34°47′50″N 87°39′54″W
- Translator: 97.9 W250BY (Florence)

Links
- Public license information: Public file; LMS
- Webcast: Listen Live
- Website: foxsportsshoals.com

WSBM (1340 AM) is a Fox Sports Radio–affiliated radio station broadcasting a sports format. Licensed to Florence, Alabama, United States, the station serves the Florence–Muscle Shoals metropolitan area. The station is currently owned by Big River Broadcasting Corporation as part of a quadropoly with Florence–licensed country music station WXFL (96.1 FM); Clifton, Tennessee–licensed adult contemporary station WLVS-FM (106.5 FM), and Florence–licensed adult hits station WQLT-FM (107.3 FM).

== History ==
WSBM went on-the-air on March 26, 1946 as WJOI. The station was initially owned by Clyde Anderson and Joe Van Sandlt under the banner Florence Broadcasting Company. At the time, it was an ABC affiliate. In 1965, an FM sister station was purchased: the former WOWL-FM (107.3 FM; now WQLT-FM). The following year, the pair were sold to WXOR, Inc., a predecessor of its current owner.

In 1973, the station changed its callsign to WXOR, having sold the WJOI calls to NBC for use on its Joy!–branded FM station WMAQ-FM (101.1 FM; now WKQX). Beginning that decade, the station began airing a country music format. WXOR's callsign was changed to the current WSBM in 1984, followed by another format change to beautiful music.

Former logo

In the early 90s, the station again changed formats, this time to urban adult contemporary under the branding Magic 1340. The station began its sports radio format in 2010, initially affiliated with Fox Sports Radio. In 2013, affiliations were changed to CBS Sports Radio, before returning to Fox, with which it remains associated with today.

== Translators ==
WSBM AM 1340 is currently rebroadcast on translator W250BY 97.9 FM. This translator had previously broadcast on 98.3 FM until its frequency was changed to 98.5 in 2001. Incidentally, this was the same frequency as WJOI-FM which was on the air in the early- and mid-1950s. This was a 140-watt FM station (the first FM station in the Florence-Muscle Shoals market) which rebroadcast WJOI AM 1340. W253AH uses the old WJOI-FM antenna which was mounted on 1340's tower in the 1950s.

WJOI-FM went off the air sometime in the late 1950s, and should not be confused with the 1960s' WJOI-FM on 107.3 which later became WQLT.

Call sign	Frequency	City of license	FID	ERP (W)	Class	FCC info
W250BY	97.9 FM	Florence, Alabama	5273	250	D	LMS
