= Frank Hughes School (Tennessee) =

Coordinates: 35.3821°N 87.9940°W

Location
- 444 Main Street; Clifton, Tennessee; 38425; United States

Information
- School type: Public
- School board: Wayne County School Board
- Teaching staff: 33.08 (FTE)
- Grades: K–12
- Gender: Co-educational
- Enrollment: 304 (2023-2024)
- Average class size: 13
- Student to teacher ratio: 9.19
- Education system: Wayne County School System
- Colors: White, black and gold
- Athletics conference: TSSAA
- Sports: Baseball, Basketball, Cheerleading, and Softball
- Mascot: Lions

Frank Hughes School is a public comprehensive K–12 school located in Clifton, Tennessee. It is part of the Wayne County School System. In 1986, the girls' basketball team had a 35–3 win/loss record and won the class A State Championship.
