= Wayne County High School (Tennessee) =

Location
- 707 South Main Street; Waynesboro, Tennessee 38485; United States; 35.30386°N 87.76183°W

Information
- School type: Public
- Teaching staff: 22.08 (FTE)
- Grades: 9-12
- Gender: Co-educational
- Enrollment: 258 (2023-2024)
- Student to teacher ratio: 11.68
- Hours in school day: 8am until 2:38pm
- Campus type: Rural
- Colors: Black and gold
- Athletics conference: TSSAA
- Sports: Cheerleading, Band, Basketball, Baseball, Softball, Football, Soccer, and Golf.
- Mascot: Wildcat
- Team name: Wildcats and Lady Cats
- Rival: Collinwood High School
- Accreditation: SACS
- Website: http://www.wchswildcats.com

Wayne County High School is a public high school located in Waynesboro, Tennessee, United States. It is part of the Wayne County School System.
