= Water Street Historic District (Clifton, Tennessee) =

Historic district in Tennessee, United States

- U.S. National Register of Historic Places
- Location within Tennessee
- Location: Water St. (State Route 128) between Polk and Cedar Sts., Clifton, Tennessee
- Coordinates: 35.3875°N 87.9925°W
- Area: 10 acres (4.0 ha)
- Architectural style: Bungalow/craftsman, Gable-front and wing
- NRHP reference No.: 92000829
- Added to NRHP: July 8, 1992

The Water Street Historic District, in Clifton, Tennessee, is a historic district which was listed on the National Register of Historic Places in 1992.

It includes about 10 acres (4.0 ha) of residential properties along Water St. (now Tennessee State Route 128) between Polk and Cedar streets in Clifton. In 1992 it included 14 contributing buildings and two non-contributing ones on eight parcels. The north edge of three of those parcels is formed by the Tennessee River.

This historic district is located less than 200 yards (180 m) from the Clifton Ferry Landing. In 1992 the Clifton Ferry was one of the last eight ferries surviving in Tennessee. The ferry has since closed, apparently.

The historic resources in the district were built from about 1870 to 1940; "the remains of late nineteenth and early twentieth century prosperity survive in the domestic architecture of Water Street." This period was the post-Civil War boom period in the town. The district has architecture ranging from Queen Anne style and Minimal Traditional architecture.

== T.S. Stribling Museum ==
The district includes the longtime home of Pulitzer Prize-winning author T.S. Stribling (1881-1965). It is now operated as the T.S. Stribling Museum. It is one of three bungalows in the district, which were all built between 1924 and 1930. The T.S. Stribling House, also known as the Kloss-Stribling House, is a two-story house that was built for T. L. Kloss in 1924. It was later purchased by Stribling.
