= Shoals Christian School =

Private school in Alabama, United States

Coordinates: 34.847791°N 87.695891°W

Information
- Funding type: Private school
- Religious affiliation: Christianity
- Established: 1997; 29 years ago
- Accreditation: Cognia; Association of Christian Schools International
- Website: www.shoalschristian.org

Shoals Christian School is a private, non-denominational Christian school in Florence, Alabama. The metropolitan area is commonly called "The Shoals". The headmaster, as of the 2021-2023 academic year, is Chuck Owens. Shoals Christian School was formed in 1997 by the merger of two schools which were sponsored by then-Christ Chapel (now Chapel) and Woodmont Baptist Church. SCS graduated its first class of high school seniors in 2000. SCS is "double-accredited by Cognia (formerly SACS, then AdvancED) and the Association of Christian Schools International" and their "students score above the state and national average on the ACT" with "an average score of 23.7"
