= Collinwood High School (Tennessee) =

Location
- 401 North Trojan Blvd. Collinwood, Tennessee 38450; United States; 35.1798°N 87.7403°W

Information
- School type: Public
- Principal: Jennifer Vandiver
- Faculty: 25
- Teaching staff: 21.83 (FTE)
- Grades: 9-12
- Gender: Co-educational
- Student to teacher ratio: 11.68
- Colors: Green and White
- Sports: Cheerleading, Band, Basketball, Baseball, Softball, Football, Tennis, Volleyball, and Golf.
- Mascot: Trojan
- Rival: Wayne County High School
- Accreditation: SACS
- Newspaper: Trojan Informer
- Website: https://www.collinwoodhigh.com/

Collinwood High School is a public high school located in Collinwood, Tennessee, United States. It is part of the Wayne County School System.
