= WLVS-FM =

- Clifton, Tennessee; United States
- Broadcast area: Savannah, Tennessee
- Frequency: 106.5 MHz
- Branding: Sunny 106.5

Programming
- Format: Adult contemporary

Ownership
- Owner: Gold Coast Broadcasting Company
- Sister stations: WXFL

History
- First air date: 2002
- Call sign meaning: "Elvis"

Technical information
- Licensing authority: FCC
- Facility ID: 87463
- Class: A
- ERP: 3,800 watts
- HAAT: 126.7 meters (416 feet)
- Transmitter coordinates: 35°28′41″N 88°06′36″W

Links
- Public license information: Public file; LMS
- Webcast: Listen Live
- Website: thesunnystation.com

WLVS-FM (106.5 FM, "Sunny 106.5") is a radio station licensed to serve Clifton, Tennessee, United States. The station is owned by the Gold Coast Broadcasting Company.

== Programming ==
Until August 3, 2017 it broadcast a country music format as a simulcast partner to WXFL ("Kix 96") in Florence, Alabama. WLVS-FM can be heard in Clifton, Decaturville, Savannah, Parsons, and Waynesboro, Tennessee. WLVS-FM is also available in more areas of Wayne County, Tennessee, Hardin County, Tennessee, Decatur County, Tennessee, and Perry County, Tennessee.

== History ==
This station received its original construction permit from the Federal Communications Commission on August 18, 1999. The new station was assigned the call letters WLVS-FM by the FCC on March 14, 2000.

In March 2000, Clifton Radio, LLC, reached an agreement to transfer the permit for this still-under construction station to the Gold Coast Broadcasting Company for a reported sale price of $75,000. The deal was approved by the FCC on May 1, 2000, and the transaction was consummated on June 28, 2000. WLVS-FM received its license to cover from the FCC on October 25, 2002.

On August 3, 2017 WLVS changed their format from country to adult contemporary, branded as "Sunny 106.5". (info taken from stationintel.com)
