= The Store (novel) =

1932 novel by Thomas Sigismund Stribling

- First edition (Doubleday, Doran)
- Author: Thomas Sigismund Stribling
- Language: English
- Publication date: 1932

The Store is a 1932 novel by Thomas Sigismund Stribling. It won the Pulitzer Prize for the Novel in 1933. It is the second book of the Vaiden trilogy, comprising The Forge, The Store, and Unfinished Cathedral. All three books in the trilogy have been kept in print since the mid-1980s by the University of Alabama Press.

== Introduction ==
The first book in the trilogy, The Forge, opens at the beginning of the American Civil War and ends with the abolition of slavery. Continuing the exploration of the transformation of the American South from its traditional agrarian society to a new economic and social order, The Store follows the return from war of Miltiades "Milt" Vaiden. Before the war he had been overseer on a major plantation, and he struggles to find a place for himself under new free labor conditions. The novel depicts how wealthy white planters and yeomen farmers, and newly freed African Americans attempt to adapt to life in the post-War South.

== Synopsis ==
Colonel Miltiades "Milt" Vaiden, a decorated Civil War Confederate officer and former overseer of Crowninshield plantation, is the central figure in this and the third novel of the trilogy. As an overseer he was in a position between the wealthy planters and poor whites; his father was a blacksmith. Struggling to gain a place after the war, he became head of the newly founded local Ku Klux Klan (KKK), made up of veterans determined to defend white supremacy. A character described by critic J. Donald Adams in the New York Times as "forceful" and "unscrupulous", Col. Milt Vaiden slowly works his way into business leadership in the town of Florence by the late 1880s, in the post-Reconstruction era.

Stribling explores the personal and economic trials and tribulations of Col. Milt and others during the post-Reconstruction era, when the labor force of freedmen has been converted mostly to sharecroppers and tenant farmers. White men work to exploit the changing conditions. The title is symbolic of Col. Milt's ethical and economic transition from post-war poverty to economic independence, set against the "old plantation" culture. The novel describes in blunt language the cultural and social stress as the old plantation society and freedmen adjust to the post-war reconstruction.

== Reception ==
Robert Coates of the New Yorker magazine compared T.S. Stribling "to Mark Twain in his abilities to convey the very life and movement of a small Southern town."

The Literary Guild selected this novel in 1932 for one of its editions, which helped to stimulate its sales.

The following year, Stribling won a 1933 Pulitzer Prize for this novel. The Pulitzer committee said it had selected it because "of its sustained interest, and because of the convincing and comprehensive picture it presents of life in an inland Southern community during the middle eighties of the last century."
