= Wayne County Schools (Tennessee) =

School district in Tennessee, United States

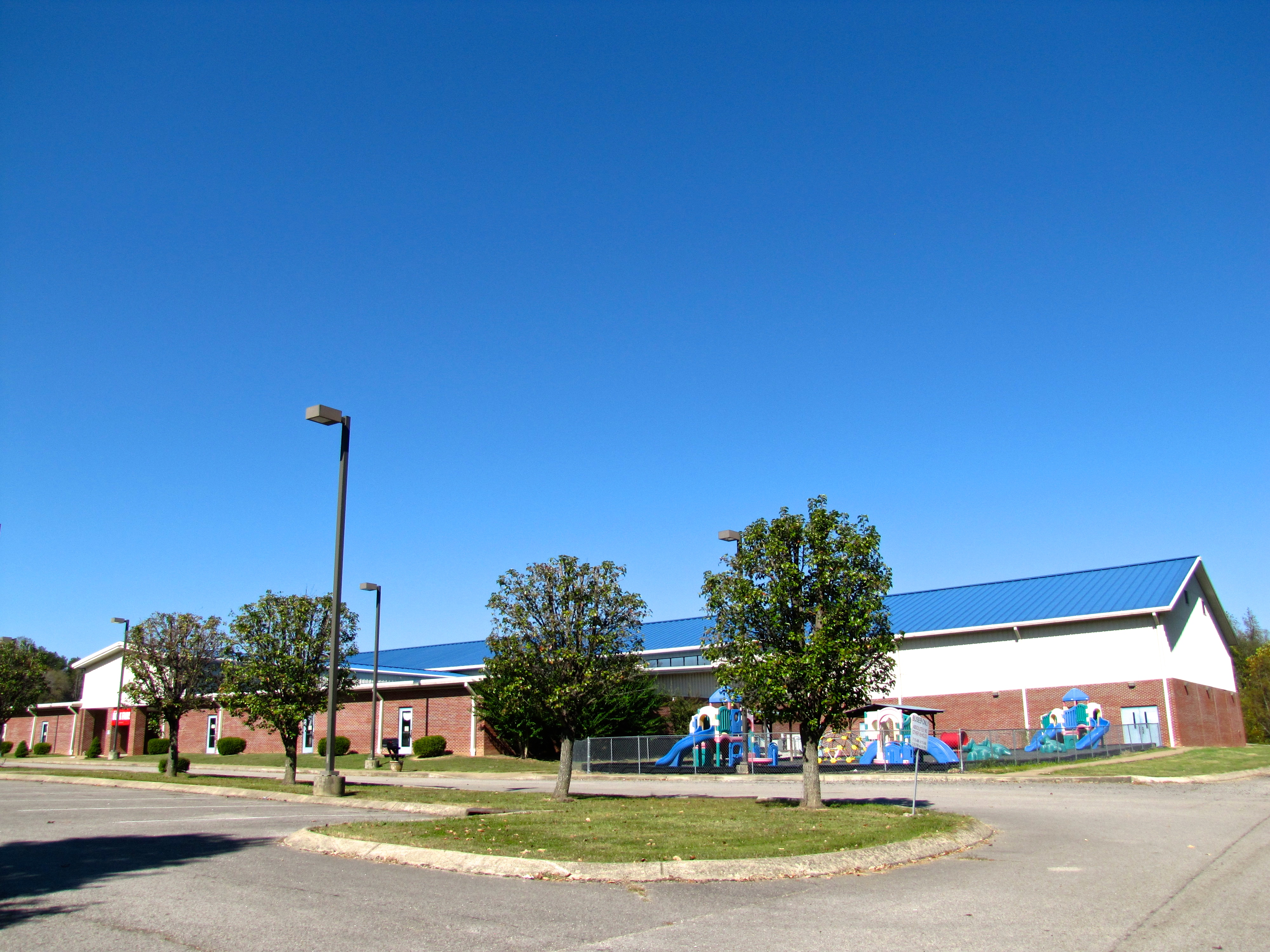
- Waynesboro Elementary School

Location
- Wayne County, Tennessee United States

District information
- Type: Public
- Grades: K-12
- Accreditation: Tennessee School Boards Association
- Schools: 8

Students and staff
- Athletic conference: TSSAA

Other information
- Website: www.waynetn.net

Wayne County Schools is a school district in Wayne County, Tennessee, United States. There are 8 schools in the district.

== Administrators ==
- Director of Schools: Dr. Ricky Inman
- Supervisor of Instruction: Cindy K. Davis
- Supervisor of Special Education: Brad Stooksberry
- Supervisor of Federal Projects: Dr. Kristy Prince
- Supervisor of Food Service: Leigh Sinclair
- Supervisor of Maintenance and Transportation: Lynn Warren
- Supervisor of Educational Technology: Ryan Keaton

== Schools ==
High schools
- Collinwood High School
- Wayne County High School

Middle schools
- Collinwood Middle School
- Waynesboro Middle School

Elementary schools
- Collinwood Elementary School
- Waynesboro Elementary School

Comprehensive (K-12) schools
- Frank Hughes School

Technology Center
- Wayne County Technology Center

== See also ==
- List of high schools in Tennessee
- List of school districts in Tennessee
