= Clifton, Tennessee =

- City
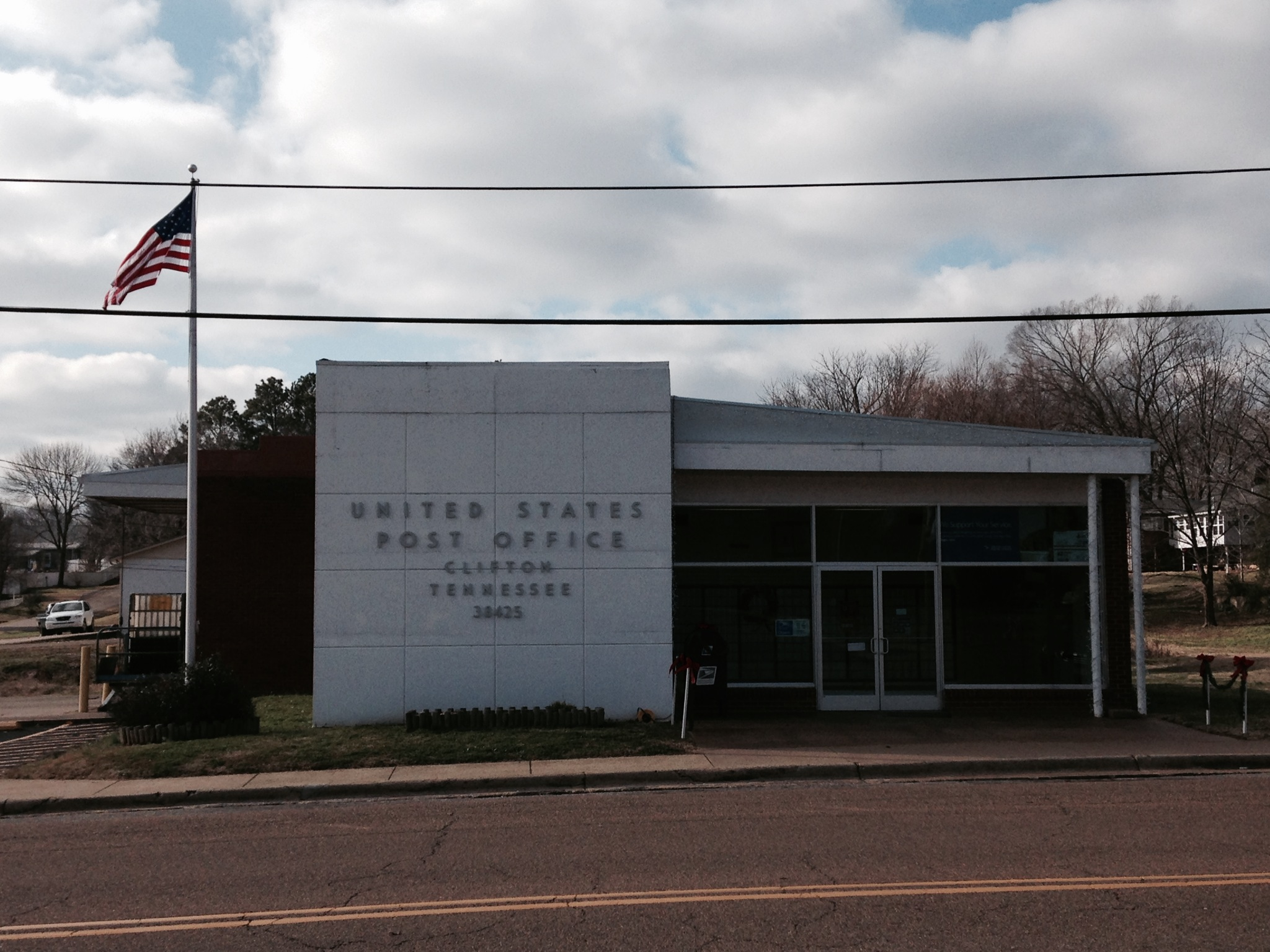
- Post office in Clifton
- Motto: "Working for you!"
- Location of Clifton in Wayne County, Tennessee.
- Coordinates: 35°22′58″N 87°59′31″W
- Country: United States
- State: Tennessee
- County: Wayne

Area
  - Total: 6.13 sq mi (15.88 km^{2})
  - Land: 5.56 sq mi (14.41 km^{2})
  - Water: 0.57 sq mi (1.48 km^{2})
- Elevation: 404 ft (123 m)

Population (2020)
  - Total: 2,651
  - Density: 476.6/sq mi (184.02/km^{2})
- Time zone: UTC-6 (Central (CST))
  - Summer (DST): UTC-5 (CDT)
- ZIP code: 38425
- Area code: 931
- FIPS code: 47-15480
- GNIS feature ID: 1305972
- Website: http://www.cityofclifton.com/

Clifton is a city in Wayne County, Tennessee, on the state's south central border with Alabama. It developed as a river port along the Tennessee River in the 19th century. Its historic districts listed on the National Register of Historic Places are associated with this period. As of the 2020 census, Clifton had a population of 2,651.

== Overview ==
The city operates the T. S. Stribling Museum in honor of its most famous resident, T. S. Stribling. Highly popular in the 1920s and 1930s, this author won the Pulitzer Prize for the Novel in 1933 for The Store, his second work of the Vaiden trilogy. The house is located in the Water Street Historic District, associated with the port past, and is listed on the National Register of Historic Places.

The state's South Central Correctional Facility is located in Clifton. A privately run medium-security prison, it has capacity for 1700 adult male offenders.

== Geography ==
Clifton is located at 35°22′58″N 87°59′31″W (35.382777, -87.992060).

According to the United States Census Bureau, the city has a total area of 7.0 square miles (18 km^{2}), of which 6.4 square miles (17 km^{2}) is land and 0.5 square miles (1.3 km^{2}) (7.75%) is water.

== Demographics ==
Historical population
Census	Pop.	Note	%±
1880	300		—
1890	529		76.3%
1900	639		20.8%
1910	711		11.3%
1950	818		—
1960	708		−13.4%
1970	737		4.1%
1980	773		4.9%
1990	620		−19.8%
2000	2,699		335.3%
2010	2,694		−0.2%
2020	2,651		−1.6%

=== 2020 census ===
As of the 2020 census, Clifton had a population of 2,651 and 268 families, and the median age was 41.4 years; 6.0% of residents were under the age of 18 and 8.6% of residents were 65 years of age or older.

For every 100 females there were 608.8 males, and for every 100 females age 18 and over there were 733.4 males age 18 and over.

0.0% of residents lived in urban areas, while 100.0% lived in rural areas.

There were 344 households in Clifton, of which 27.3% had children under the age of 18 living in them. Of all households, 36.6% were married-couple households, 23.5% were households with a male householder and no spouse or partner present, and 33.7% were households with a female householder and no spouse or partner present. About 38.7% of all households were made up of individuals and 13.6% had someone living alone who was 65 years of age or older.

There were 425 housing units, of which 19.1% were vacant. The homeowner vacancy rate was 4.0% and the rental vacancy rate was 16.4%.

Racial composition as of the 2020 census
Race	Number	Percent
White	1,761	66.4%
Black or African American	776	29.3%
American Indian and Alaska Native	4	0.2%
Asian	0	0.0%
Native Hawaiian and Other Pacific Islander	0	0.0%
Some other race	73	2.8%
Two or more races	37	1.4%
Hispanic or Latino (of any race)	95	3.6%

=== 2000 census ===
As of the census of 2000, there was a population of 2,699, with 353 households and 223 families residing in the city. The population density was 420.1 inhabitants per square mile (162.2/km^{2}). There were 392 housing units at an average density of 61.0 per square mile (23.6/km^{2}). The racial makeup of the city was 59.69% White, 39.42% African American, 0.11% Native American, 0.04% Asian, 0.44% from other races, and 0.30% from two or more races. Hispanic or Latino of any race were 0.85% of the population.

There were 353 households, out of which 26.1% had children under the age of 18 living with them, 47.0% were married couples living together, 12.7% had a female householder with no husband present, and 36.8% were non-families. 34.0% of all households were made up of individuals, and 12.5% had someone living alone who was 65 years of age or older. The average household size was 2.28 and the average family size was 2.93.

In the city, the population was spread out, with 7.0% under the age of 18, 13.3% from 18 to 24, 56.2% from 25 to 44, 17.7% from 45 to 64, and 5.9% who were 65 years of age or older. The median age was 35 years. For every 100 females, there were 561.5 males. For every 100 females age 18 and over, there were 684.7 males.

The median income for a household in the city was $22,500, and the median income for a family was $35,000. Males had a median income of $36,848 versus $19,318 for females. The per capita income for the city was $13,780. About 15.4% of families and 22.0% of the population were below the poverty line, including 26.5% of those under age 18 and 21.3% of those age 65 or over.

== Education ==
- Frank Hughes College (No longer in operation)
- Frank Hughes School
- Columbia State Community College

== Radio station ==
There is one radio station located in Clifton (106.5 FM, "Sunny 106.5") WLVS-FM. The station is owned by the Gold Coast Broadcasting Company and airs an Adult Contemporary music format.

== Notable people ==
- T. S. Stribling, notable as an American writer, is known for The Vaiden Trilogy, of which the second novel, The Store, won the Pulitzer Prize for the Novel in 1933.
- Robert Selph Henry, railroad executive and historian

== Manufacturing ==
- American Whirlpool
- Brown Foreman (A Stave Mill)

== Transportation ==
=== Highways ===
- US 641 (U.S. Route 641 and unsigned State Route 114)
- SR 128 (State Route 128)
- SR 228 (State Route 228)

=== Aviation ===
- – Hassell-Carroll Field Airport
