= Florence, Alabama =

City in and county seat of Lauderdale County, Alabama

- City
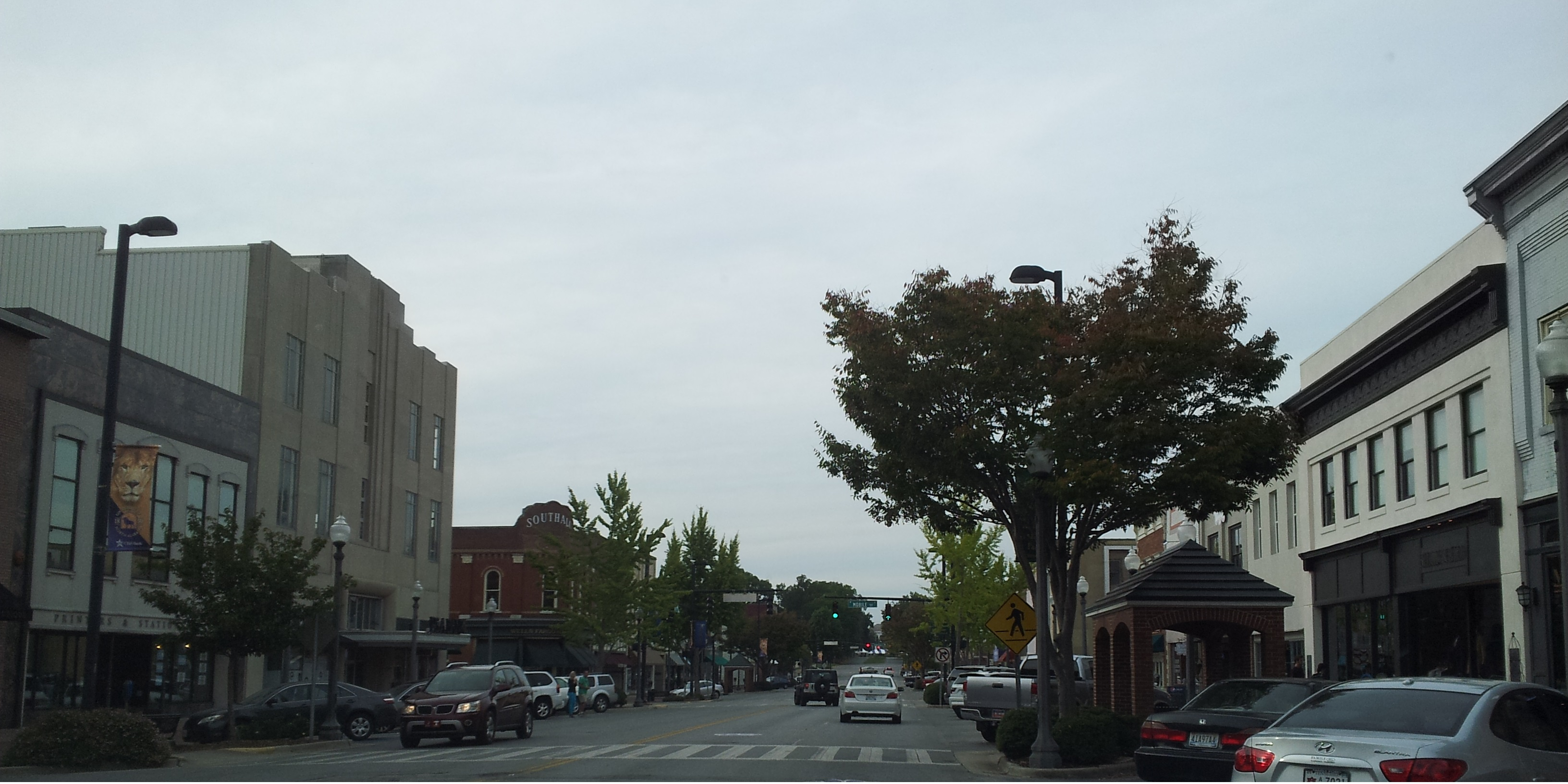
- Downtown Florence Historic District

- Flag Seal
- Nickname: "Alabama's Renaissance City"
- Location of Florence, Alabama
- Coordinates: 34°50′47″N 87°38′50″W
- Country: United States
- State: Alabama
- County: Lauderdale
- Founded: March 12, 1818
- Incorporated: January 7, 1826
- Named for: Florence, Tuscany, Italy

Government
  - Type: Mayor–Council (Since 1984)

Area
  - City: 27.293 sq mi (70.689 km^{2})
  - Land: 27.084 sq mi (70.147 km^{2})
  - Water: 0.209 sq mi (0.541 km^{2})
- Elevation: 604 ft (184 m)

Population (2020)
  - City: 40,184
  - Estimate (2023): 42,437
  - Rank: US: 954th AL: 11th
  - Density: 1,597.0/sq mi (616.61/km^{2})
  - Urban: 78,925 (US: 360th)
  - Metro: 155,175 (US: 280th)
- Time zone: UTC−6 (Central (CST))
  - Summer (DST): UTC−5 (CDT)
- ZIP Codes: 35630, 35631, 35632, 35633, 35634
- Area codes: 256 and 938
- FIPS code: 01-26896
- GNIS feature ID: 2403619
- Sales tax: 9.5%
- Website: florenceal.org

Florence is a city located in and the county seat of Lauderdale County, Alabama, United States, in the state's northwestern corner. It has a population of 40,184 in the 2020 census. Florence is located along the Tennessee River and is home to the University of North Alabama, the oldest public college in the state. Florence is located about 70 miles (110 km) west of Huntsville, Alabama, via US-72, and about 115 miles (185 km) northwest of Birmingham, Alabama.

Florence is the largest and principal city of the "Quad Cities," more commonly known as "The Shoals," which also includes the cities of Muscle Shoals, Sheffield, and Tuscumbia in Colbert County and which collectively had a population of 148,779 as of the 2020 census. Florence is considered northwestern Alabama's primary economic hub.

Annual tourism events include the W. C. Handy Music Festival in the summer and the Alabama Renaissance Faire in the fall. Landmarks in Florence include the 20th-century Rosenbaum House, the only Frank Lloyd Wright-designed home located in Alabama. The Florence Indian Mound and Museum, listed on the National Register of Historic Places, was constructed by indigenous people between 400 BCE and 100 BCE in the Woodland period and is the largest surviving earthen mound in the state.

== Geography ==
According to the United States Census Bureau, the city has a total area of 27.293 square miles (70.69 km^{2}), of which, 27.084 square miles (70.15 km^{2}) is land and 0.209 square miles (0.54 km^{2}) (0.40%) is water.

=== Climate ===
The climate in this area is characterized by hot, humid summers and generally mild to cool winters. According to the Köppen Climate Classification system, Florence has a humid subtropical climate, abbreviated "Cfa" on climate maps.

The average temperature of Florence is 59 °F (15 °C). The average yearly precipitation in Florence is 57.06 inches (144.9 cm). On average, Florence gets 2.25 inches (5.7 cm) of snow per year, which is above Alabama's average of 0.57 inches (1.4 cm).

While Florence is almost 300 miles (480 km) from the Gulf of Mexico, strong hurricanes have brought severe weather to the area. For example, in 2005, the path of Hurricane Katrina came very close to the city, causing nearly 70-mile-per-hour (110 km/h) winds and some storm damage.

Climate data for Florence, 1991–2020 simulated normals (558 ft elevation)
Month	Jan	Feb	Mar	Apr	May	Jun	Jul	Aug	Sep	Oct	Nov	Dec	Year
Mean daily maximum °F (°C)	50.5 (10.3)	55.0 (12.8)	63.7 (17.6)	72.7 (22.6)	80.1 (26.7)	87.1 (30.6)	89.8 (32.1)	89.4 (31.9)	84.6 (29.2)	74.3 (23.5)	62.4 (16.9)	53.4 (11.9)	71.9 (22.2)
Daily mean °F (°C)	40.6 (4.8)	44.2 (6.8)	52.2 (11.2)	60.6 (15.9)	69.1 (20.6)	76.5 (24.7)	79.5 (26.4)	78.6 (25.9)	73.0 (22.8)	61.9 (16.6)	50.5 (10.3)	43.5 (6.4)	60.9 (16.0)
Mean daily minimum °F (°C)	30.7 (−0.7)	33.6 (0.9)	40.5 (4.7)	48.7 (9.3)	58.1 (14.5)	65.8 (18.8)	69.3 (20.7)	68.0 (20.0)	61.3 (16.3)	49.3 (9.6)	38.7 (3.7)	33.4 (0.8)	49.8 (9.9)
Average precipitation inches (mm)	5.30 (134.60)	5.28 (134.01)	5.44 (138.15)	5.20 (132.00)	4.92 (124.98)	4.84 (122.88)	4.96 (125.97)	4.22 (107.26)	4.08 (103.70)	3.63 (92.17)	4.12 (104.57)	6.07 (154.24)	58.06 (1,474.53)
Average dew point °F (°C)	32.2 (0.1)	34.7 (1.5)	40.5 (4.7)	48.7 (9.3)	58.5 (14.7)	66.4 (19.1)	70.0 (21.1)	68.7 (20.4)	62.8 (17.1)	51.8 (11.0)	41.0 (5.0)	35.8 (2.1)	50.9 (10.5)
Source: PRISM Climate Group

== History ==
=== Beginnings ===
Evidence for human habitation in the Florence area goes back to at least 500 BCE, when the Florence Indian Mound, the largest of its type in the Tennessee Valley, was constructed as an earthwork during the Woodland period. Successive cultures arose after this. In the historic period, the area of present-day Florence was occupied by the Chickasaw Nation. They first encountered white traders and settlers beginning in the late 1700s, and were forced to cede their land to the Federal government through a series of treaties in early 1800s, as part of the Indian Removal policy to extinguish tribal land claims east of the Mississippi River. The land on which Florence stands was ceded in 1816. The Chickasaw were removed to west of the river in Indian Territory (now Oklahoma).

General John Coffee, John McKinley, a future U.S. Supreme Court Justice, businessman James Jackson, and four other trustees established the Cypress Land Company to found a town on a hill overlooking the Tennessee River. The company bought the land, believing that Florence's location along Jackson's Military Road and at the end of the treacherous Muscle Shoals rapids on the Tennessee River would enable it to develop as a major commercial center. In 1819, Coffee commissioned Ferdinand Sannoner, a young Italian engineer, to survey and plan the town. Situating the town on the plateau overlooking the Tennessee River provided protection from flooding as well as diseases common in the swampier lowlands by the riverbank. The investors were so pleased with Sannoner's work that he was allowed to choose the name of the new settlement; he named it after Florence, the capital of the Tuscany region of Italy.

=== Antebellum Florence (1826–1860) ===
The first river steamboat visited the town in 1821. Speculators and settlers, including General Andrew Jackson and President James Monroe, bought up plots of land as they were sold by the Cypress Land Co. Florence quickly became an important commercial hub on the Tennessee River, but it did not reach the level its founders had hoped. However, Florence did grow quickly enough to be incorporated by the State Legislature in 1826. By 1831, the increased cotton cultivation in the area to the east of Florence necessitated the expansion and improvement of transport facilities in the area, including the digging of a canal around the Muscle Shoals. Congress appropriated land for that purpose and construction began in 1831, with the Muscle Shoals Canal opening in 1837, however, the locks could not support steamships and the state had difficulty maintaining the construction, so it was abandoned shortly thereafter.

Equally important was the construction of a railroad bridge across the Tennessee River, with the first bridge being completed in the 1830s; but it would be washed away by a flood soon after completion. Another bridge would be completed in 1840 and would last until the mid-1850s, when it was damaged by tornadoes in 1850 and 1854, resulting in its decommissioning. The rock piers of the 1840 bridge survived the damage and form the foundation of the present structure. As a part of Florence's development as a commercial hub, a variety of manufacturing enterprises sprung up around the city, including an iron foundry, lumber, cotton, and wool mills, as well as a complex of cotton, flour, and corn mills along Cypress Creek known as the Globe Factory.

Plantations, too, sprang up around Florence, driven by cheap fertile land and high cotton prices. Two of these plantation homes are of note: Sweetwater Mansion and the Forks of Cypress. Sweetwater Mansion is notable for being the residence of Robert M. Patton, the first governor of Alabama after the Civil War and for the various paranormal sightings that have occurred there. The Forks of Cypress, on the other hand, was the plantation home of James Jackson, one of the original Cypress Land Co. trustees, and was acclaimed for its architectural style and the quality of its racing horses.

With the plantation economy, so too came slavery. While slavery in northwest Alabama did not reach the magnitude that it did in the Black Belt, a significant percentage of the population (about 14% in 1818) was enslaved and by 1860, there were twenty three plantations in Lauderdale County that had over fifty slaves. Not all slaves worked on the plantation, however, many worked in construction or in other contexts. Dred Scott was brought to Florence in the 1820s and served as a hosteler in the local inn, before his participation in the landmark Supreme Court case.

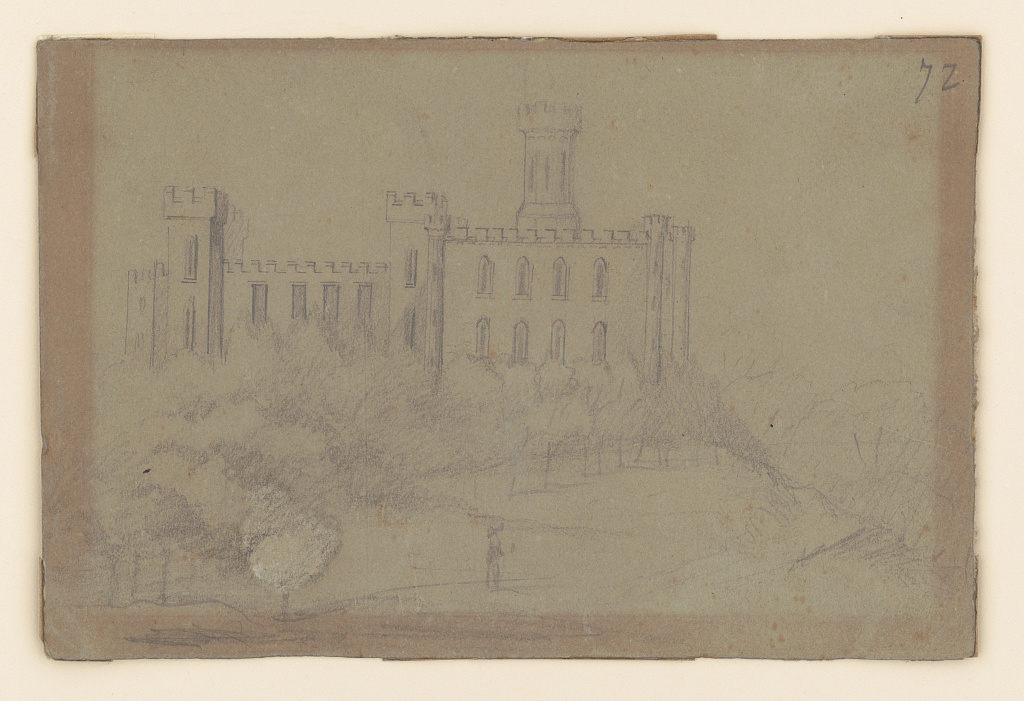
Adolph Metzner drawing of the "female college" in Florence

As a sign of progress and ambition, townspeople established the Florence Female Academy in 1847, for paying female students. By the 1850s, the school was converted into the Florence Synodical Female College, affiliated with the Presbyterian Church. It closed in 1893. A historical marker commemorates the site. LaGrange College, Alabama's first chartered college, was established near Leighton in 1830 before being moved across the river to Florence in 1855. The move to Florence was controversial, however, and the Florence site was denied the use of the LaGrange name and was thus chartered as Florence Wesleyan University in 1856, with its main building at Wesleyan Hall. One hundred and 60 students enrolled in the first year of operation (1855) of Florence Wesleyan University and quickly attracted students from five states and two foreign countries. The university also chartered a grammar school, which still serves today as Kilby Laboratory School, the only university-operated elementary school in Alabama. After becoming publicly owned during the Postbellum period, the university went through a variety of name changes, including: Florence Normal School, Florence State Teachers College, and Florence State University, before changing its name to the University of North Alabama in 1972.

=== 20th century ===
The Burrell Normal School was open from 1903 until 1969, and served as a private segregated school for African American students in Florence, serving grades 1-12 and as a normal school.

== Demographics ==
Historical population
Census	Pop.	Note	%±
1850	802		—
1860	1,395		73.9%
1870	2,003		43.6%
1880	1,359		−32.2%
1890	6,012		342.4%
1900	6,478		7.8%
1910	6,689		3.3%
1920	10,529		57.4%
1930	11,729		11.4%
1940	15,043		28.3%
1950	23,879		58.7%
1960	31,649		32.5%
1970	34,031		7.5%
1980	37,029		8.8%
1990	36,426		−1.6%
2000	36,264		−0.4%
2010	39,319		8.4%
2020	40,184		2.2%
2023 (est.)	42,437	▲	5.6%
U.S. Decennial Census; 2020 Census

=== Racial and ethnic composition ===
Florence city, Alabama – Racial and ethnic composition Note: the US Census treats Hispanic/Latino as an ethnic category. This table excludes Latinos from the racial categories and assigns them to a separate category. Hispanics/Latinos may be of any race.
Race / Ethnicity (NH = Non-Hispanic)	Pop 1980	Pop 1990	Pop 2000	Pop 2010	Pop 2020	% 1980	% 1990	% 2000	% 2010	% 2020
White alone (NH)	30,750	29,791	28,184	28,986	28,006	83.04%	81.78%	77.72%	73.72%	69.69%
Black or African American alone (NH)	5,845	456	6,932	7,573	7,503	15.78%	1.25%	19.12%	19.26%	18.67%
Native American or Alaska Native alone (NH)	107	4	84	146	122	0.29%	0.01%	0.23%	0.37%	0.30%
Asian alone (NH)	100	0	224	537	519	0.27%	0.00%	0.62%	1.37%	1.29%
Native Hawaiian or Pacific Islander alone (NH)	x	x	8	16	22	x	x	0.02%	0.04%	0.05%
Other race alone (NH)	27	0	32	22	92	0.07%	0.00%	0.09%	0.06%	0.23%
Mixed race or Multiracial (NH)	x	x	313	632	1,824	x	x	0.86%	1.61%	4.54%
Hispanic or Latino (any race)	200	179	487	1,407	2,096	0.54%	0.49%	1.34%	3.58%	5.22%
Total	37,029	36,426	36,264	39,319	40,184	100.00%	100.00%	100.00%	100.00%	100.00%

=== 2020 census ===
As of the 2020 census, there were 40,184 people, 17,516 households, and 9,348 families residing in the city. The median age was 36.4 years; 18.9% of residents were under the age of 18, 5.0% were under 5, and 19.5% were 65 years of age or older. For every 100 females there were 87.4 males, and for every 100 females age 18 and over there were 83.2 males age 18 and over.

99.2% of residents lived in urban areas, while 0.8% lived in rural areas.

There were 17,516 households in Florence, of which 23.8% had children under the age of 18 living in them. Of all households, 34.9% were married-couple households, 21.6% were households with a male householder and no spouse or partner present, and 38.2% were households with a female householder and no spouse or partner present. About 39.0% of all households were made up of individuals and 15.2% had someone living alone who was 65 years of age or older.

There were 19,710 housing units, of which 11.1% were vacant. The homeowner vacancy rate was 2.4% and the rental vacancy rate was 8.7%.

=== 2010 census ===
As of the 2010 census, there were 39,319 people, 17,267 households, and _ families residing in the city. The population density was 1,512.4 inhabitants per square mile (583.9/km^{2}). There were 19,299 housing units at an average density of 742.3 per square mile (286.6/km^{2}). The racial makeup of the city was 75.04% White, 19.41% African American, 0.40% Native American, 1.39% Asian, 0.07% Pacific Islander, 1.79% from some other races and 1.90% from two or more races. Hispanic or Latino people of any race were 3.58% of the population.

=== 2000 census ===
As of the 2000 census, there were 36,264 people, 15,820 households, and 9,555 families residing in the city. The population density was 1,454.6 inhabitants per square mile (561.6/km^{2}). There were 17,707 housing units at an average density of 710.2 per square mile (274.2/km^{2}). The racial makeup of the city was 78.39% White, 19.20% African American, 0.24% Native American, 0.62% Asian, 0.03% Pacific Islander, 0.54% from some other races and 0.97% from two or more races. Hispanic or Latino people of any race were 1.34% of the population.

There were 15,820 households, out of which 25.9% had children under the age of 18 living with them: 43.6% were married couples living together, 14.0% had a female householder with no husband present, and 39.6% were non-families. Nearly 33.8% of all households were made up of individuals, and 13.3% had someone living alone who was 65 years of age or older. The average household size was 2.20, and the average family size was 2.82.

In the city, the population was spread out, with 21.4% under the age of 18, 13.7% from 18 to 24, 25.7% from 25 to 44, 21.7% from 45 to 64, and 17.5% who were 65 years of age or older. The median age was 37 years. For every 100 females, there were 84.0 males. For every 100 females age 18 and over, there were 79.7 males.

The median income for a household in the city was $28,330, and the median income for a family was $40,577. Males had a median income of $34,398 versus $21,385 for females. The per capita income for the city was $19,464. About 14.4% of families and 20.4% of the population were below the poverty line, including 25.9% of those under age 18 and 13.3% of those age 65 or over.

=== American Community Survey ===
As of the 2023 American Community Survey, there are 17,203 estimated households in Florence with an average of 2.25 persons per household. The city has a median household income of $50,396. Approximately 19.3% of the city's population lives at or below the poverty line. Florence has an estimated 56.5% employment rate, with 31.1% of the population holding a bachelor's degree or higher and 90.8% holding a high school diploma.

=== Ancestry ===
The top five reported ancestries (people were allowed to report up to two ancestries, thus the figures will generally add to more than 100%) were English (92.8%), Spanish (5.4%), Indo-European (0.8%), Asian and Pacific Islander (1.0%), and Other (0.2%).

== Education ==
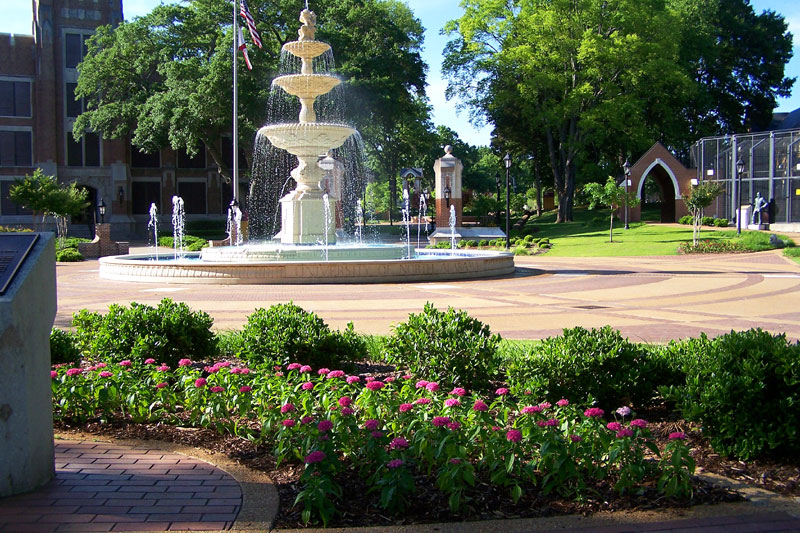
Harrison Plaza, University of North Alabama

Situated in Florence, and founded in 1830 as LaGrange College, and later operating as a normal school, the University of North Alabama, a public, co-educational, higher education institution, is Alabama's oldest state-certified university.

Florence City Schools is the organization of the K–12 public school system. Florence High School (grades 10–12) is the main high school, with an enrollment of approximately 1,000 students. It was created by a merger between the previous two city high schools, Bradshaw High School and Coffee High School. Florence High is located at the former Bradshaw site in the eastern part of the city. The merger also led to the creation of Florence Middle School (grades 7–8) and the Florence Freshman Center (grade 9). The middle school is located at the former Coffee High campus, east of downtown, and the Florence Freshman Center is located at the Florence High School campus.

There are five private schools in Florence: Riverhill School for K-6, St. Joseph Regional Catholic School for grades K–8, and Mars Hill Bible School, Shoals Christian School, and Florence Christian Academy. Each of the latter are multi-denominational, K–12 schools.

== Government ==
The city has a mayor-council form of government. Each of the council members is elected from one of six single-member districts. The mayor is elected at-large.

Mayor

- Ron Tyler

Ron Tyler was elected as the mayor of Florence on August 26, 2025.

City Council

- District 1: Kaytrina P. Simmons
- District 2: Jackie Hendrix
- District 3: Alisa Dickson
- District 4: Josh Bowling
- District 5: Thomas Spence
- District 6: Chapel King

== Culture and events ==
The City of Florence is home to several museums, historical sites and numerous parks that serve the cultural and recreational needs of citizens and tourists. A variety of festivals are held throughout the year.

=== Museums ===
- The W. C. Handy Home and Museum is dedicated to the noted musician, known as the "father of the blues". Handy was born in a log cabin at this site in 1873. The museum contains a collection of Handy's personal papers, artifacts and other items he donated before his death in 1958.
- The Rosenbaum House, at 601 Riverview Drive, is the only building in the state designed by famed American architect Frank Lloyd Wright. It was built in 1939. The house was the first in the city to have such novelties as a carport and under-floor heating. It is open for tours six days of the week.
- The Forks of Cypress was a large cotton plantation located in Florence. Its remains can be seen in the form of 24 Greek columns, as well as the Jackson Family cemetery. Both are on private property and are not usually open to the public. The local historical society hosts tours sporadically. A scale replica of the plantation home is located in downtown Florence and is currently used as a Regions bank.
- The Florence Mound and Museum is located along the Tennessee River. The earthwork mound is the largest in the Tennessee Valley, and was built nearly 1700 years ago during what archaeologists refer to as the Woodland Period. Originally a six-sided structure with an earthen embankment surrounding it on three sides, the earthwork represents a Native American worldview of the time it was built. Today, the mound is a four-sided structure, approximately 43 feet high, measuring 310 by 230 feet at the base, and about 145 by 95 feet on top. The Museum alongside the mound, built in 2017, displays and interprets Native American culture from northwest Alabama, telling the story of indigenous peoples of the area dating back 13,000 years.
- The Kennedy-Douglass Center for the Arts consists of three historic buildings known as the Wilson Park Houses on the National Register of Historic Places in downtown Florence. The art center showcases local, regional, and sometimes national artists. It also offers classes and workshops to people of all ages.

=== Festivals ===
- The W. C. Handy Music Festival. Every year for a week in late July or early August, musicians from around the country descend upon the Shoals. Area restaurants offer live music, and artists often perform in Wilson Park or along streets downtown. Though the focus was originally on blues and jazz, the musical genres now include rock, country, gospel and others. The festival, the largest in the Shoals area, also includes educational events, art shows, and athletic competitions.
- The Alabama Renaissance Faire is held in Wilson Park during the fourth full weekend in October. Activities include arts and crafts, magicians, reenactments and musical performances. Festivalgoers are invited to dress in period clothing.

=== Other attractions ===
- Braly Municipal Stadium, on the campus of Florence Middle School, is the home to the Florence High School football team.

== Recreation ==
=== Parks ===
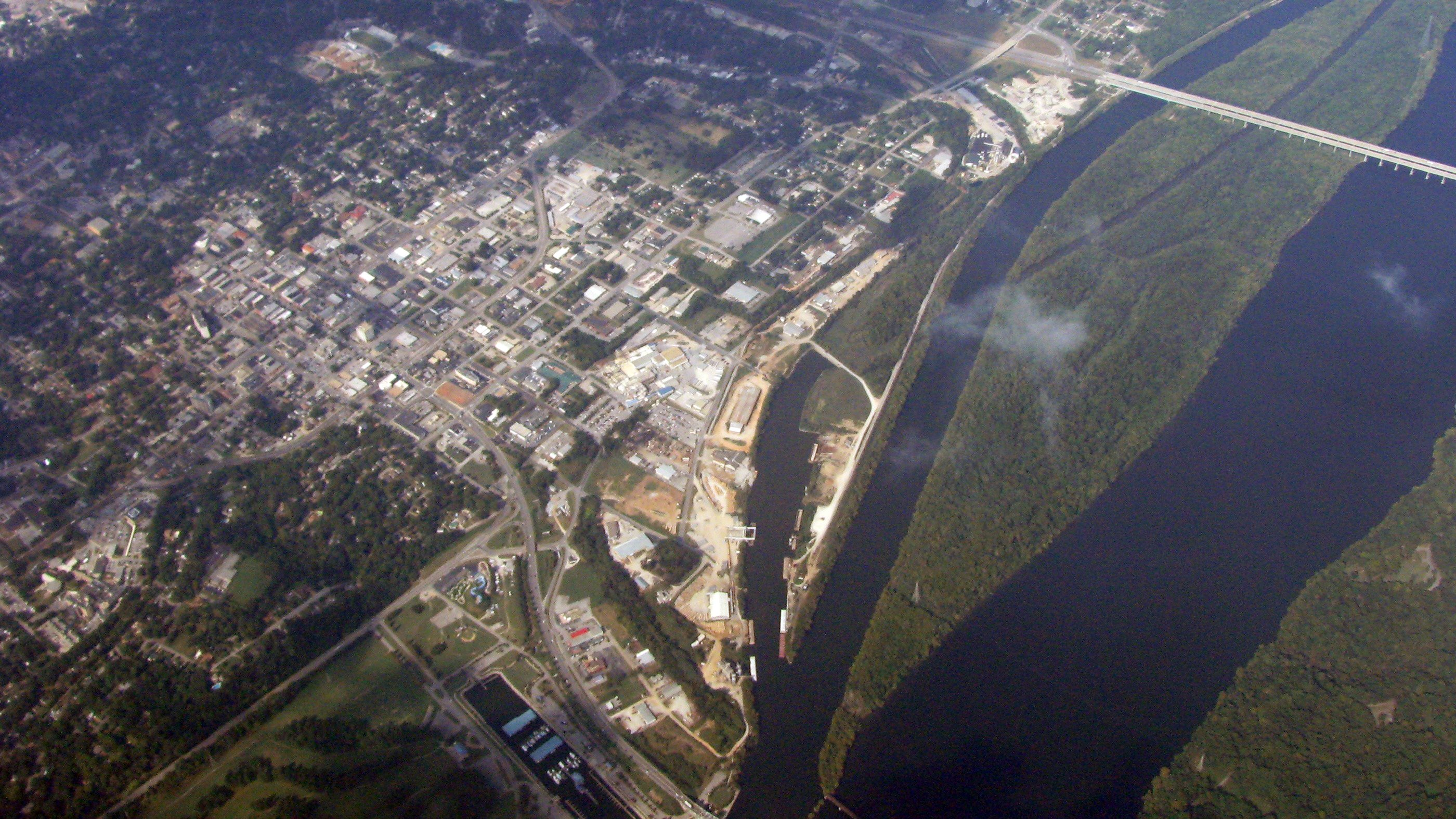
Aerial view of Florence

- Cox Creek Park is home to a children's playground, horseshoe pits, an indoor archery range, and twelve tennis courts. Recent additions have included the new Florence Skate Park, the only skateboard park in the area, and a new stadium for the University of North Alabama softball team. The Florence/Lauderdale Farmer's Market is also located at the park.
- Deibert Park was a former horse farm belonging to the Deibert family, the park now includes a playground, picnic shelters, and three ponds. The network of walking trails is enjoyed by walkers, joggers, and bikers. The Children's Museum of the Shoals is also on the park property.
- Florence Sportsplex has baseball, softball, and soccer fields. It is located at the corner of Alabama Highway 20 and Gunwaleford Road.
- Martin Park is the location for the city swimming facility, at the Royal Avenue Recreation Center. The park is also home to a playground, tennis courts, picnic shelters, and a 0.75 miles (1.21 km) fitness trail.
- McFarland Park is also the location of the Florence Harbor and Marina. While serving as host to several events throughout the year, the park is also equipped with a playground, numerous picnic shelters, campgrounds, soccer fields, baseball fields, a disc golf course, a golf driving range, and lighted walking trails. Situated along Pickwick Lake, the park is also used by fishermen, boaters, and swimmers.
- River Heritage Park is located at the base of the Renaissance Tower and adjacent to the Renaissance Shoals Resort & Spa and Conference Center. The park contains scenic overlooks of the Tennessee River and Wilson Dam. Also included are picnic shelters, a playground, and an interactive fountain called the Splash Pad.
- Veterans Memorial Park contains a memorial to the war veterans of Florence and Lauderdale county. Twenty-two campsites, six lighted tennis courts, baseball and softball fields, playgrounds, and picnic shelters are also found at the park. Veterans Park is also home to one of the oldest disc golf courses in the state, established in 1983.
- Wildwood Park is located adjacent to the University of North Alabama along Cypress Creek. It is the most secluded and serene of the city parks. The park has a pavilion, picnic tables, nature trails, and bicycle trails. Swimming, fishing and canoeing are some of the park's recreational activities.
- Wilson Park is located in the heart of downtown, across from the Florence-Lauderdale Public Library. Its grounds are used for numerous festivals and events. The original Plan of Florence in 1818 showed the area as a Public Walk. In 1924, the park was renamed in honor of former U.S. President Woodrow Wilson, shortly after his death.

=== Other recreation ===
- Blackberry Trail Golf Course – a municipal golf course
- Broadway Recreation Center
- Florence Harbor – a full-service marina on Tennessee River (Pickwick Lake) mile marker 256
- Handy Recreation Center
- Royal Avenue Recreation Center

== Transportation ==
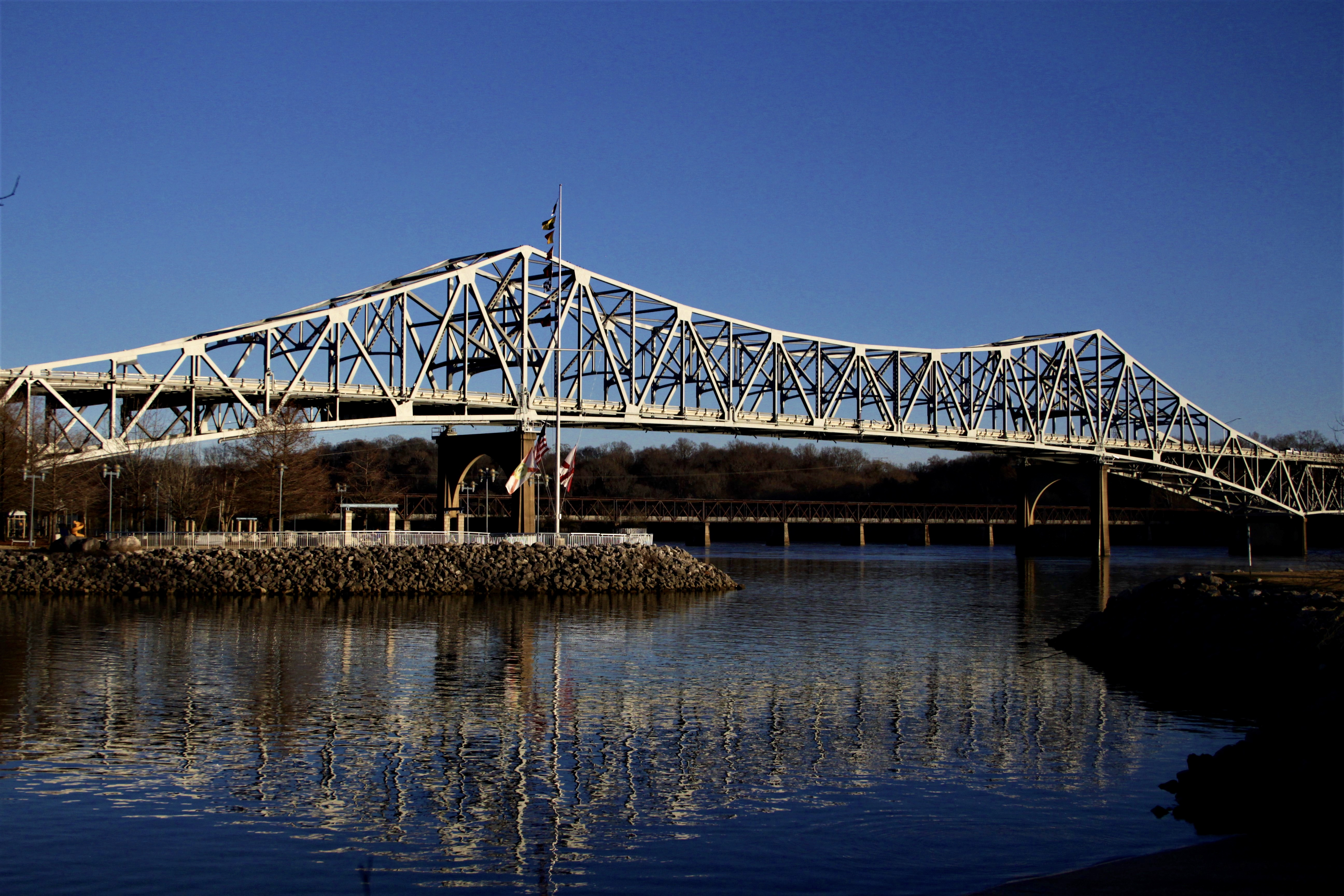
O'Neal Bridge over the Tennessee River

Florence is the merger point for two major U.S. Highways, as well as several Alabama Highways. Both U.S. Highway 43 and U.S. Highway 72 merge just east of the city limits in Killen, and are co-signed their entire length through the city. Highway 43, running north and south, helps connect the city to Lawrenceburg and Columbia to the north in Tennessee, as well as Tuscaloosa and Mobile to the south. Highway 72 helps connect the city to Huntsville and Chattanooga, Tennessee to the east and Memphis, Tennessee to the west. Interstate 65 is accessible about forty-five minutes east on Highway 72. Both of these roads cross the Tennessee River on O'Neal Bridge, connecting Florence to Sheffield.

Alabama state highways that serve the city include State Route 13, State Route 17, State Route 20, State Route 133, and State Route 157. Alabama 133 connected Florence and Muscle Shoals via Wilson Dam until 2002, when the new six-lane "Patton Island Bridge" finished construction. The bridge is part of a new corridor that eventually saw the widening of Wilson Dam Road in Muscle Shoals to Alabama 20 (Phase 1 widening to six lanes to Avalon Avenue, Phase 2 widening to 4 lanes to Alabama 157/72 alt), and the construction of a new road from the bridge to Florence Blvd, eventually becoming part of Helton, Dr. in Florence. State Route 157, a road to Florence and the Shoals area, serves as a four-lane link to Interstate 65 in Cullman. The project was completed in the summer of 2007. The road is known as the "University of North Alabama Highway".

Florence and the Shoals area does not have a direct link to an Interstate highway. One solution discussed has been the Memphis to Atlanta Highway, proposed to connect the two cities via a freeway through north Alabama. However, in recent years Mississippi has concentrated its funding on U.S. 78 (Interstate 22), also known as "Corridor X". Though U.S. 72 through Mississippi is four lanes, there are no plans to upgrade it to freeway status. The state of Georgia has also not committed to the necessary work to connect the freeway from the Alabama state line to Atlanta. The highway remains in the planning stages with the Alabama Department of Transportation.

Another plan recently discussed is extending Interstate 565 west from its current terminus just outside Decatur, along Alabama 20/Alternate U.S. 72. The plan has received support from Decatur officials.

There is no fixed-route transit service in Florence. However, the Northwest Alabama Council of Local Governments operates a dial-a-ride transit service known as NACOLG Transit.

Florence is served by the Northwest Alabama Regional Airport in Muscle Shoals. The airport is used for commercial and general aviation, It is served commercially by Contour Airlines which provides several daily flights to Charlotte Douglas International Airport, an American Airlines hub, giving the city access to hundreds of domestic and international destinations. Huntsville International Airport, another option for Florence residents, offers service to eleven domestic destinations, and is an hour's drive from Florence.

Local industry is served by the Tennessee Southern Railroad (TSRR), which runs from Florence to Columbia, Tennessee, and the Port of Florence on Pickwick Lake.

== Media ==
- TimesDaily, a daily newspaper
- Courier Journal, a direct-mail, weekly newspaper; founded in 1884 as the Florence Herald and renamed in 1982

Numerous radio, television and low-power FM radio stations and translators serve Florence and the greater area, all of which are in the greater Florence MSA. Among them are:

=== AM radio ===
- WSBM (1340 AM; 1 kW; Florence, AL; owner: Big River Broadcasting Corporation)

=== FM radio ===
- W280DA (103.9 FM; Florence, AL; owner: Bible Broadcasting Network, Inc.)
- WQLT-FM (107.3 FM; Florence, AL; owner: Big River Broadcasting Corporation)
- W258AE (99.5 FM; Florence, AL; owner: WAY-FM Media Group, Inc.)
- WWFA-FM (102.7 FM; Florence, AL; owner: Flinn Broadcasting)
- WFIX (91.3 FM; Florence, AL; owner: Tri-State Inspirational B/C Corp.)
- WXFL (96.1 FM; Florence, AL; owner: Big River Broadcasting Corporation)
- W253AH (98.5 FM; Florence, AL; owner: Big River Broadcasting Corporation)
- W276AM (103.1 FM; Florence, ETC., AL; owner: J AND J Broadcasting)
- W225AB (92.9 FM; Florence, AL; owner: William P. Rogers)

=== Television ===
- WHDF (Channel 15; Florence, AL; owner: Valley Television, LLC)
- WFIQ (Channel 36; Florence, AL; owner: Alabama Educational Television Commission)
- WAFF-TV (NBC)
- WHNT-TV (CBS)
- WAAY-TV (ABC)
- WZDX-TV (FOX)
- WHDF-TV (The CW)

Past television stations

- WYLE (Channel 26; Florence, AL; owner: ETC Communications Inc.)
- WOWL (Channel 15; Florence, AL)
- W57BV (Channel 57; Florence, AL; owner: Trinity Broadcasting Network)

Cable providers
Florence is served by Comcast and AT&T. Their services include television, internet, home phone, and home security services. Comcast has been a provider of television and other services in the Florence area since the early 1960s. AT&T has provided services to Florence since the early 2000s, when they acquired Bell South. Florence is also served by major satellite television providers, including DirecTV and Dish Network.

== Notable people ==
- Walt Aldridge, songwriter and record producer
- Malcolm Armstead, professional basketball player
- Ron Billingsley, former professional football player
- Whitney Boddie, professional basketball player in the Women's National Basketball Association (WNBA)
- Sterling Bose, jazz trumpeter
- Jeff Brantley, former Major League Baseball pitcher
- Jeff Briggs, video game developer and CEO of Firaxis Games
- Roger Briggs, composer
- Greg Burdine, member of the Alabama House of Representatives
- Thomas Burrows, professional baseball player
- The Butler Twins, Detroit blues musicians
- Jerry Carrigan, drummer and record producer
- Stewart Cink, PGA golfer, 2009 British Open Champion
- John Coffee, General during the War of 1812
- Dennis Condrey, professional wrestler and member of The Midnight Express
- Oscar De Priest, the first African American to be elected to Congress from outside the southern states
- Bud Dunn, horse trainer who won the Tennessee Walking Horse World Grand Championship twice
- Ronnie Flippo, U.S. representative for Alabama
- Byron Franklin, former National Football League (NFL) wide receiver
- Donnie Fritts, musician and songwriter
- Braxton Garrett, professional baseball player for the Miami Marlins
- Eric "Red Mouth" Gebhardt, singer-songwriter
- Donna Jean Godchaux, singer, the Grateful Dead
- Brett Guthrie, U.S. representative for Kentucky
- Elbert Bertram Haltom Jr., former United States federal judge
- W. C. Handy, blues musician, known as "father of the blues"
- Billy Hardwick, PBA bowler
- Kneeland Hibbett, University of Alabama football player
- Dorrit Hoffleit, astronomer
- Kelvin Holly, musician, guitarist for Little Richard, The Amazing Rhythm Aces
- John Hood, Rear admiral in the United States Navy during World War I
- Patterson Hood, guitarist, singer and songwriter for Drive-By Truckers
- Autry Inman, rockabilly musician
- Tammy Irons, member of the Alabama State Senate
- Jason Isbell, musician
- Thomas Jeter, fencer
- Jim Jones, football player
- Buddy Killen, former owner of Killen Music Group
- Julianne Kirchner, swimmer
- Hank Klibanoff, professor at Emory University
- Adam Lazzara, musician and lead singer of Taking Back Sunday
- Lenny LeBlanc, songwriter
- Jesse Marsh, comic book artist and animator
- Dewey Martin, actor
- Floyd Matthews, former member of the United States Navy
- Alison McCreary, Miss Alabama 1996
- Fran McKee, first female Rear Admiral in the United States Navy
- John McKinley, U.S. congressman, senator, and associate justice of the U.S. Supreme Court
- Don Leslie Michael, recipient of the Medal of Honor during the Vietnam War
- Tom Monroe, disc golfer
- Melba Montgomery, country music singer
- Charles Moore, civil rights photographer
- John Mortvedt, soil scientist at the Tennessee Valley Authority in Muscle Shoals
- Harryette Mullen, professor at the University of California, Los Angeles
- Emmet O'Neal, 34th Governor of Alabama
- Mary Phagan, 13-year-old girl murdered in Atlanta, Georgia, on April 26, 1913
- Sam Phillips, record producer, discovered Elvis Presley
- Norbert Putnam, record producer
- James T. Rapier, U.S. representative for Alabama
- Rob Rausch, reality tv contestant Love Island USA and The Traitors
- Billy Reid, fashion designer
- Milton P. Rice, former Attorney General of Tennessee and former Secretary of State of Tennessee
- Freddie Roach, American football player and coach
- Al Romine, former professional football player
- Jonathan Rosenbaum, film critic
- Wimp Sanderson, former college basketball coach
- Dred Scott, of the Dred Scott vs. Sanford case
- Oscar Streit, former professional baseball pitcher
- T. S. Stribling, 20th-century novelist
- Randy Tate, former Major League Baseball pitcher
- Grant Taylor, Major League Baseball pitcher
- Mark Thompson, radio personality and member of The Mark & Brian Show
- Chris Tompkins, musician and Grammy-winning songwriter
- Lamonte Turner, University of Tennessee Basketball player
- Frank R. Walker, rear admiral in the United States Navy during World War II
- Gary Weaver, former professional football linebacker
- Jessica Wesson, retired actress.
- White Dawg, crunk rapper
- John Paul White, guitarist, singer and songwriter for Grammy Award-winning duo The Civil Wars
- Josh Willingham, former Major League Baseball player
- S. A. M. Wood, Confederate States Army general
- Larry Woods, former professional football player
- Tom York, television and radio personality

== See also ==
- Cotton Gin Treaty
- Jackson and McMinn Treaty
- Treaty of the Chickasaw Council House (Chickasaw)
