= 2014 North American winter storm =

2014 North American winter storm can refer to

- January 2-4, 2014 North American blizzard
- January 20-22, 2014 North American blizzard
- January 2014 Gulf Coast winter storm
- February 2014 nor'easter
- March 2014 North American winter storm
- March 2014 nor'easter
- November 13-21, 2014 North American winter storm
- December 2014 North American storm complex
