= 2014 winter storm =

2014 winter storm may refer to:

- 2014 Gulf Coast winter storm
- 2014 North American cold wave (disambiguation)
