= January 2014 winter storm =

January 2014 winter storm may refer to:

- 2014 North American cold wave (disambiguation)
- 2014 Gulf Coast winter storm
- Winter storms of 2013-2014 in the United Kingdom
