= 2014 North American winter =

2014 North American winter may refer to:

- 2013–14 North American winter
- 2014–15 North American winter
