= Eisenhower Tree =

Loblolly pine formerly located on the Augusta National Golf Club in Augusta, GA, US

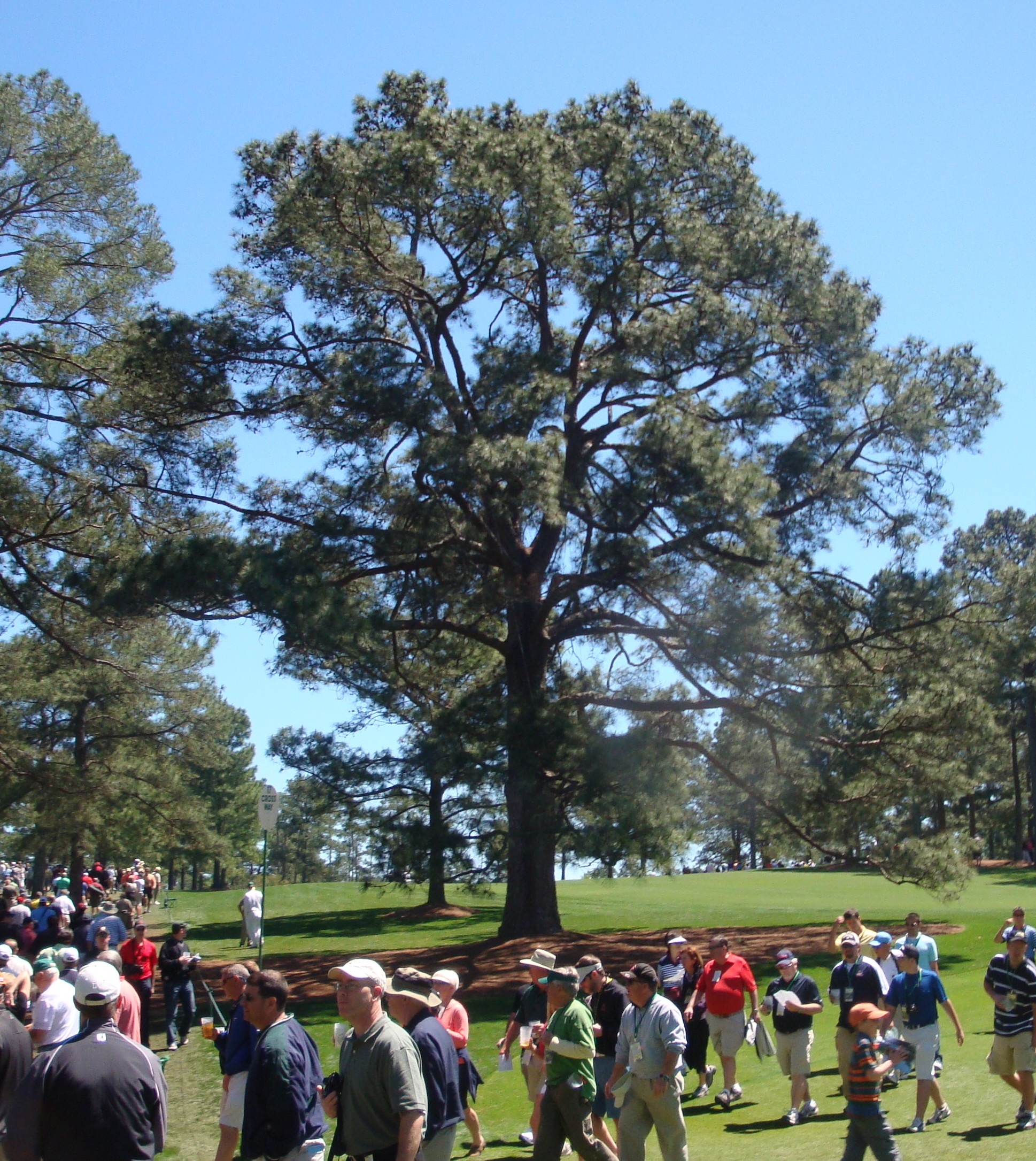
- The Eisenhower Tree in 2011

- Location within Georgia
- Species: Loblolly pine (Pinus taeda)
- Location: Augusta, Georgia
- Coordinates: 33.4993°N 82.0239°W
- Date seeded: c. 1889
- Date felled: February 2014
- Custodian: Augusta National Golf Club

The Eisenhower Tree was a loblolly pine located on the Augusta National Golf Club in Augusta, Georgia. In the 1950s it was named after U.S. President Dwight D. Eisenhower who unsuccessfully lobbied to have it taken down after it interfered with his golf game. Due to its size, history, and location on a prominent golf course, it is considered iconic of the Augusta golf course and is one of the most famous trees in American golf. It was called "among the most famous landmarks in golf" by Cindy Boren in The Washington Post and "arguably the most famous tree in golf" by Martin Dempster of The Scotsman. In February 2014, the tree was removed after suffering extensive damage from a major ice storm.

== Description and origins ==
The tree species was a native loblolly pine. It stood about 65 feet (20 m) tall and was wider than is typical. It was located on the 17th hole at the Augusta National Golf Club, approximately 210 yards (190 m) from the Masters tee on the left side of the fairway. It was estimated to be 100 to 125 years old at the time it died.

Eisenhower was an Augusta National member who spent considerable time at the club. Indeed, in November 1952 when President-elect Eisenhower needed to be briefed by an atomic energy official on highly classified nuclear matters, including that the first successful hydrogen bomb test had been held, a secret meeting was held in the manager's office within the clubhouse at Augusta National.

But as much as he liked Augusta National, Eisenhower hit the tree on the 17th fairway while playing golf so many times that, at a 1956 club meeting, he proposed that it be cut down. Not wanting to offend the president, the club's chairman, Clifford Roberts, immediately adjourned the meeting rather than reject the request. The tree was linked to Eisenhower ever since; when Eisenhower ran for president, there were bumper-stickers that read "Ben Hogan For President. If We're Going To Have A Golfer--Let's Have A Good One!"

== Golfing history ==
The Eisenhower Tree has played a prominent role in the annual Masters Tournament. One year, the Tree came into play as Tommy Aaron hit a shot off the 17th tee which became known as the "Lost Ball Incident". The ball could not be located and a drop was given. The next day according to Aaron, while playing on the 17th again, the ball apparently fell from its perch within the tree. Jack Nicklaus stated "I'm not sure I believe it."

When the course was redesigned in 1999 to be more challenging, there were concerns about the tree blocking players but it proved not to be a hindrance.

In 2011, Tiger Woods was playing a shot from underneath the Eisenhower and damaged his left knee and Achilles tendon when he slipped on some pine straw. The injuries sidelined him until August 2011 and his world ranking dropped to 58th.

== Damage and replacement ==
In February 2014, the Eisenhower Tree was removed after suffering extensive damage during a major ice storm. "The loss of the Eisenhower Tree is difficult news to accept", Augusta National chairman Billy Payne said. "We obtained opinions from the best arborists available and … were advised that no recovery was possible." The storm occurred two months before the Masters Tournament. A remnant of the tree was donated to the Eisenhower Presidential Library in Abilene, Kansas and is on display.

The loss of the tree brought tributes. Jack Nicklaus said, "The Eisenhower Tree is such an iconic fixture and symbol of tradition at Augusta National. It was such an integral part of the game and one that will be sorely missed."

There is another tree named after Eisenhower, located at Dalmeny Golf Club in Scotland, planted by the President during a visit to Edinburgh to receive the freedom of the city in 1946. On hearing of the death in Augusta, the club offered to provide an acorn to plant a new oak tree.

== See also ==
- List of individual trees
