= February 2014 nor'easter =

Major storm in the United States

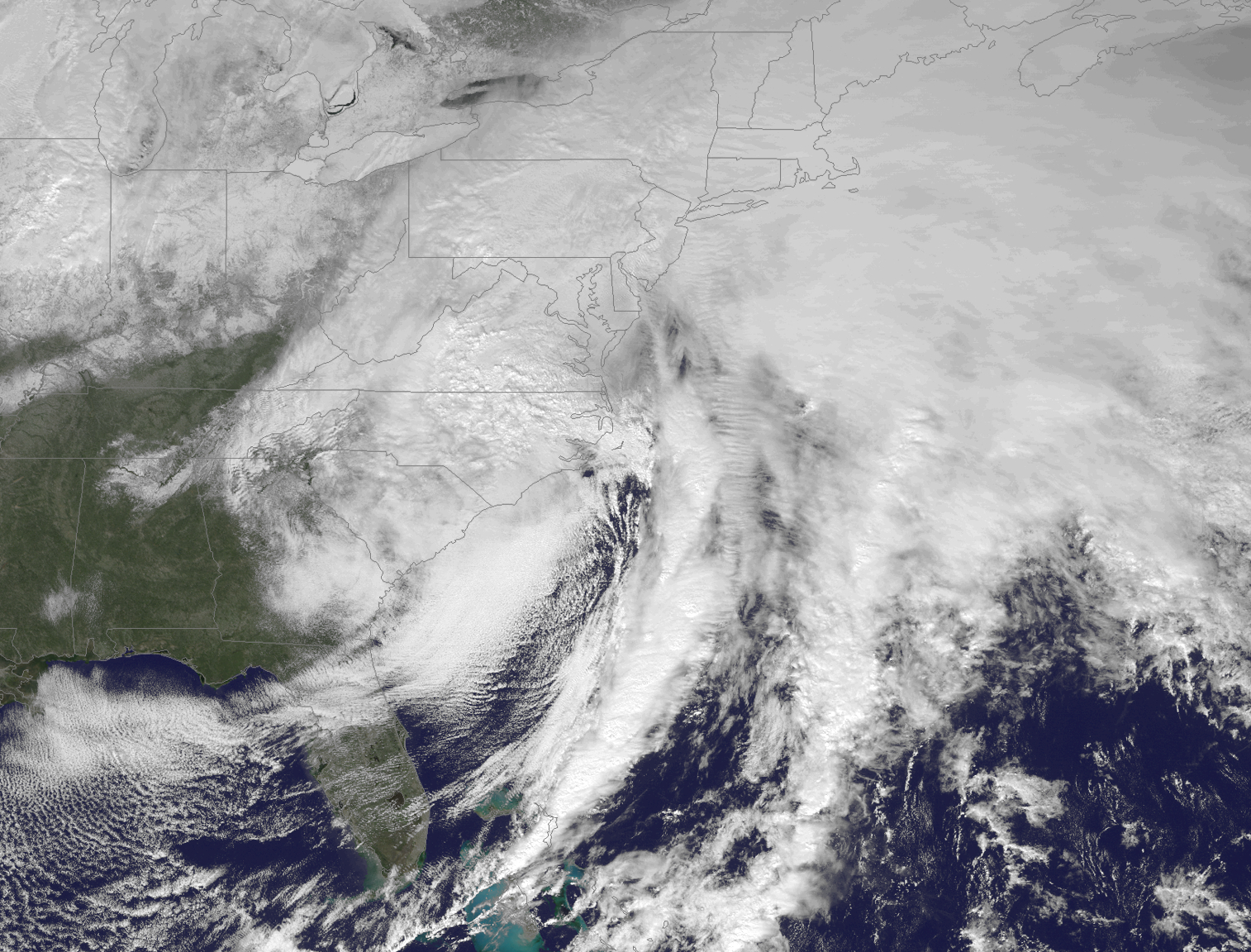
- The nor'easter tracking across the United States East Coast on February 13

Meteorological history
- Formed: February 11, 2014
- Exited land: February 15, 2014
- Dissipated: February 24, 2014

Category 4 "Crippling" winter storm
- Regional snowfall index: 10.66 (NOAA)
- Highest winds: 75 mph (120 km/h) (1-minute sustained winds)
- Highest gusts: 54 mph (87 km/h) in Rockport, Massachusetts
- Lowest pressure: 968 mbar (hPa); 28.59 inHg
- Max. snowfall: Snow – 28.5 in (72 cm) in Pilot, Virginia; Ice – 1 in (25 mm) in 5 different locations in South Carolina and Louisiana

Overall effects
- Fatalities: 22 total
- Damage: $750 million (2014 USD)
- Areas affected: Southern, Midwestern and Eastern United States, Eastern Canada, Europe, Central Russia
- Power outages: 1.2 million
- Part of the 2013–14 North American winter

From February 11–14, 2014, a major nor'easter, unofficially named Winter Storm Pax by The Weather Channel and other media, produced a damaging snow and ice storm that affected the Southern United States and East Coast of the United States, bringing with it up to a foot of snow and crippling ice across parts of the South. Thousands if not hundreds of thousands of people were left in the dark for days, possibly even up to 2 weeks without power. Areas from eastern Alabama, including Atlanta in Georgia to the Southeast coast and South Carolina experienced icy precipitation as the system moved east . A new area of low pressure developed off the South Carolina coast late on February 12, and began to intensify as it tracked to the north before impacting the Northeast as a nor'easter the following day, with snowfall rates of up to 1–2 inches (2.5–5.1 cm) per hour. The storm eventually passed into Canada on February 14 before moving out to sea, dissipating by February 24, ten days later. Snow totals in the heaviest affected regions ranged anywhere from 6–24 inches (15–61 cm) as a result.

Impacts from the storm were widespread and damaging, especially in the South which already faced a crippling winter storm two weeks prior. Delta Air Lines canceled over 2,000 flights, and it was reported by 8:00 p.m. Thursday, February 13, that as many as 6,500 flights originating in or destined for the United States had been canceled. On that day 70 percent of flights were cancelled at airports in Baltimore, Philadelphia, Washington, D.C., and Charlotte. Approximately 1.2 million homes and businesses lost power as the storm moved from the South through the Northeast. By the evening of Thursday, February 13, about 550,000 customers remained in the dark, mostly in South Carolina and Georgia. In total, the nor'easter killed 22 people and left at least $750 million in damages in its wake. Cleanup efforts were hampered in the Northeast as another winter storm affected the region only days later.

== Meteorological history ==
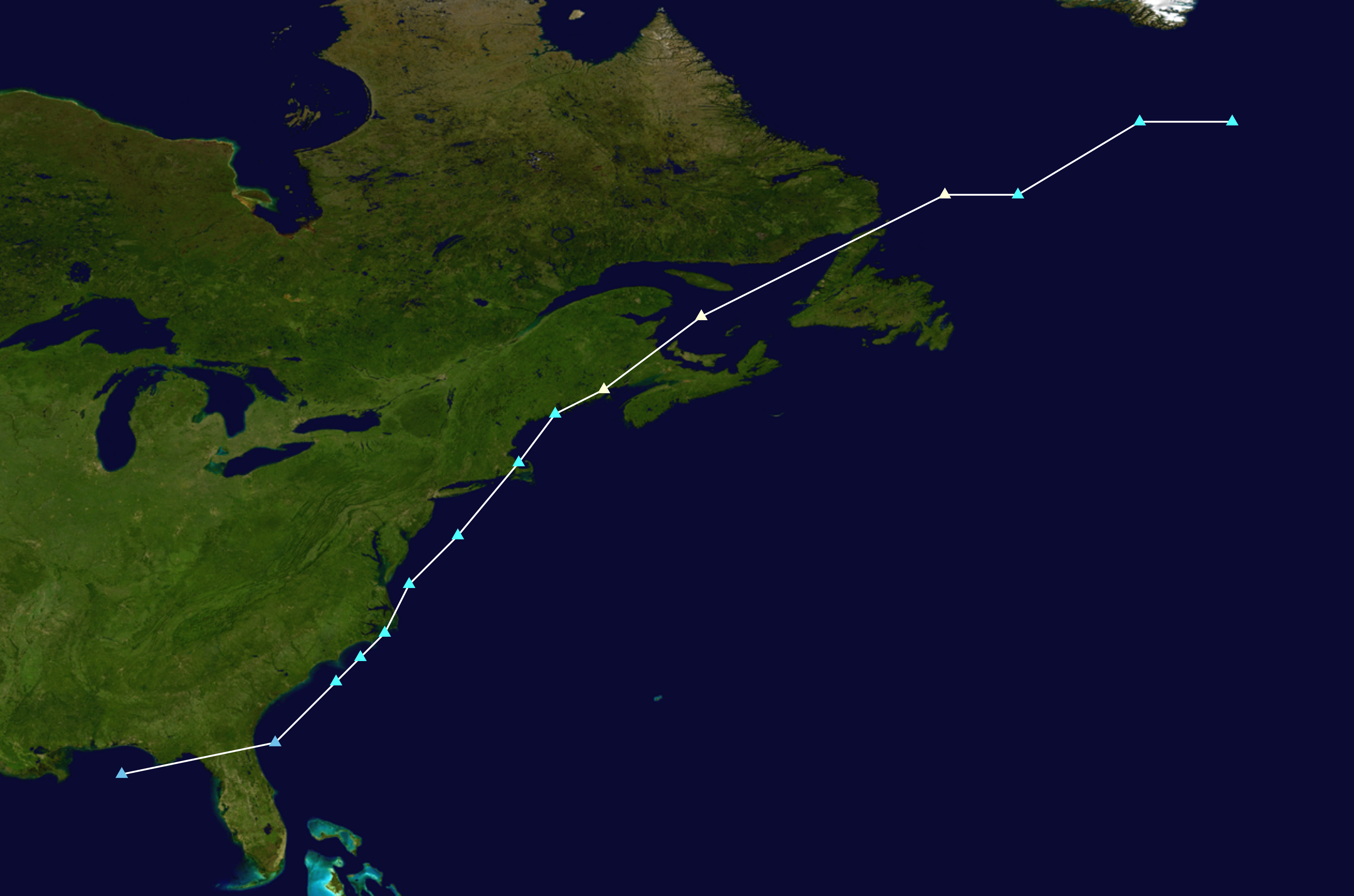
Map plotting the storm's track and intensity, according to the Saffir–Simpson scale Map key Saffir–Simpson scale Tropical depression (≤38 mph, ≤62 km/h) Tropical storm (39–73 mph, 63–118 km/h) Category 1 (74–95 mph, 119–153 km/h) Category 2 (96–110 mph, 154–177 km/h) Category 3 (111–129 mph, 178–208 km/h) Category 4 (130–156 mph, 209–251 km/h) Category 5 (≥157 mph, ≥252 km/h) Unknown Storm type Tropical cyclone Subtropical cyclone Extratropical cyclone, remnant low, tropical disturbance, or monsoon depression

Late on February 11, the Weather Prediction Center (WPC) began issuing storm summary bulletins on a weak area of low pressure that formed along a stationary front on the extreme southern edge of the Gulf Coast of the United States, bringing wintry precipitation to the coastline. Precipitation expanded as snow on the northern outskirts of the system as the disturbance moved eastwards towards the Florida Peninsula. By late on February 12, as it strengthened and moved ashore in western Florida, coastal redevelopment began as a new surface low formed off the coast of South Carolina. By this point, a large swath of freezing rain had spread over a good portion of the Southeast, with snow encroaching on and spreading into the Mid-Atlantic states. Early the next morning, after the two lows merged into one, heavy snowbands moved throughout the Mid-Atlantic and Northeast as the system started undergoing rapid deepening into a nor'easter as it paralleled the East Coast, spreading a large swath of 12–18 inches (30–46 cm) of snowfall along an axis right over the Interstate 95 corridor; with mixing issues closer to the coast as warmer air from the Atlantic filtering in.

By later that afternoon, when it had reached a pressure of 988 mbar (29.2 inHg), most precipitation in the Mid-Atlantic had ceased due to drier air infiltrating the system. Continued rapid deepening occurred into the night into early on February 14 as another round of snow moved into the Northeast on the back-end of the nor'easter, increasing the pressure gradient and causing gusty winds along the coast. The system peaked with a pressure of 968 mb (28.6 inHg) later that morning as it moved into Canada, as the WPC terminated storm summary bulletins at the same time as the overall event concluded across the Northeast U.S. The system then continued to depart from the East Coast, before finally dissipating on February 24 near Europe.

== Preparations and impact ==
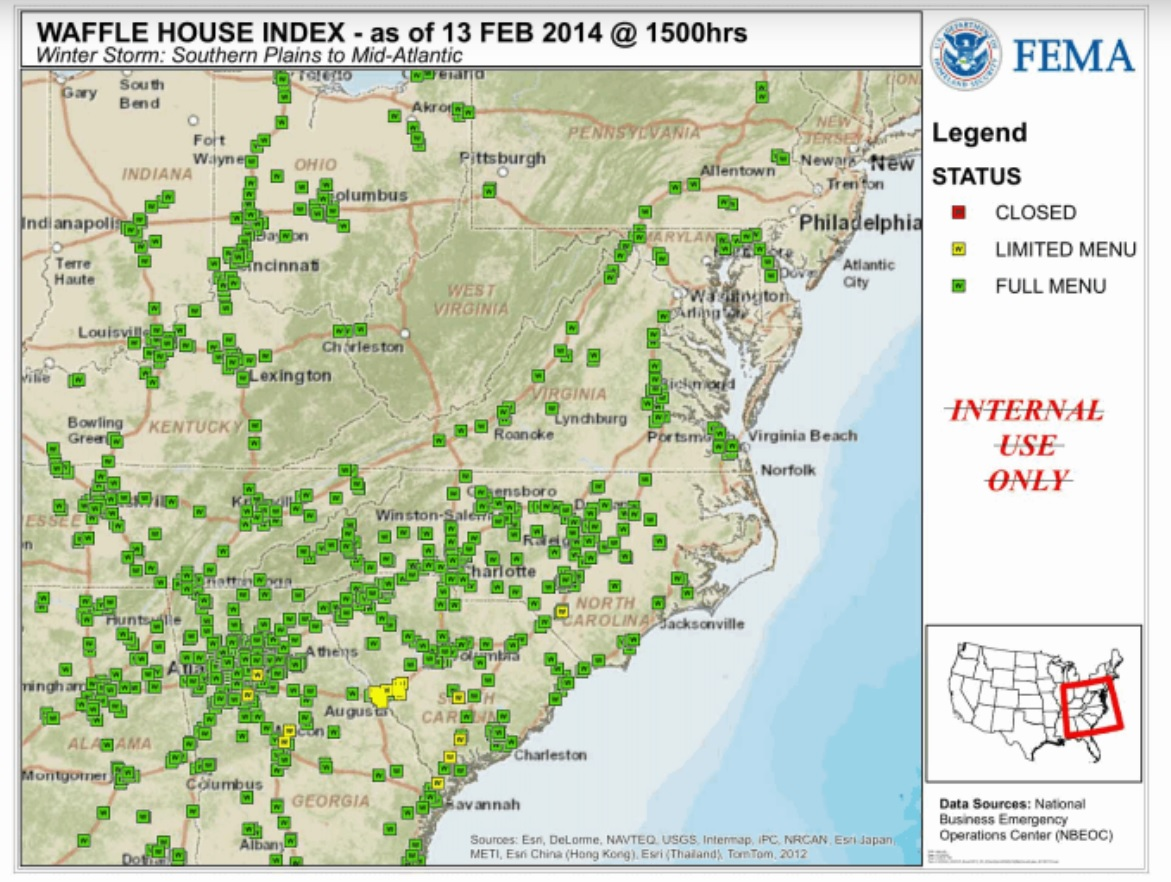
The Waffle House Index on February 13, showing ongoing disruption in Georgia and South Carolina.

=== Southern United States ===
==== Texas to Alabama ====
Four people died in traffic accidents in Texas due to ice, and in Round Rock on February 11, a single accident resulting from ice on a bridge affected 20 vehicles. Mississippi had two deaths attributed to the weather. Several tractor-trailers jackknifed on Interstate 65 in northeast Alabama.

==== Georgia ====
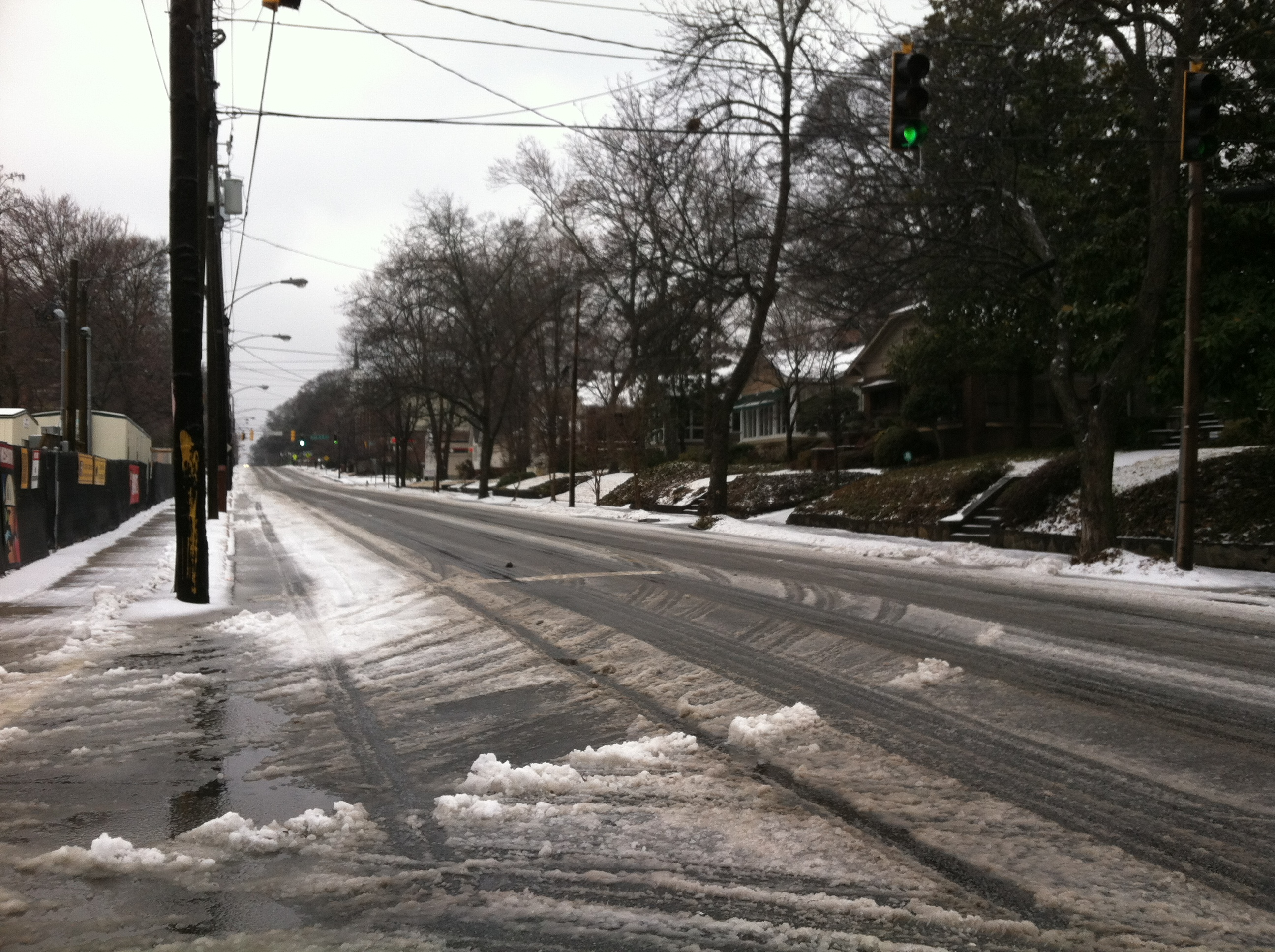
Atlanta during the winter storm

After being caught unprepared by another storm two weeks earlier, officials in metro Atlanta were much better prepared for this storm, having put down so much sand and gravel that by the weekend residents were asking for street sweeping to clean up the dust and potentially windshield-cracking stones it left behind. Most businesses and all schools were closed, and few people were on the roads. Governor Nathan Deal declared a state of emergency, which he did not do two weeks earlier.

The forecast was for freezing rain comparable to the January 2000 ice storms, which caused 500,000 to lose power and resulted in $35 million in damage, while areas of further-north Georgia received unusually heavy snows. Precipitation started as light rain late on the 10th, with significant snow by the following morning while still above freezing, turning back to light rain before ending by mid-day. More light rain began after midnight, changing to snow as temperatures fell, then to sleet, freezing rain, back to sleet again before another significant snow by the morning of the 13th.

Areas north of the city generally got mostly snow and sleet, while a large swath from the south metro area eastward got the heaviest ice accumulations, though a dry slot at mid-day proved to be much more of a factor in limiting accumulations than had previously been forecast. The worst damages occurred in east Georgia, where over 80% of Augusta was left in the dark, and the Augusta National Golf Club was left littered with branches and other damaged landscaping just a few weeks before the Masters Tournament, in addition to a leaking water tower. The historic Eisenhower Tree, located on the 17th hole of the golf course, suffered irreversible damage and had to be removed. The storm damaged $65 million worth of timber. Further concerning residents was a magnitude 4.1 earthquake two days later, followed by a 3.2 aftershock two days later, at which time most power had been restored, after the storm.

Several people were injured in sledding accidents. One being taken to a hospital near Holly Springs was in an ambulance that was hit by a skidding car, which then hit a Georgia National Guard vehicle that was escorting the ambulance. The GNG vehicle then took the young child the rest of the way to get medical attention for the original injuries (none were incurred by anyone during the accident). One woman died of hypothermia without heat in her home. The Oconee County Sheriff's Office jokingly canceled Valentine's Day, while many florists were late for deliveries to customers after their own incoming flower shipments were delayed.

By late February 16, only a few hundred were still without power in east Georgia.

==== Carolinas ====
In parts of North Carolina, the forecast ice storm, which would follow snow, was expected to be the worst since December 2002. Around 6–12 inches (15–30 cm) of snow was dropped in some areas, along with accumulating ice. Governor Pat McCrory, declaring a state of emergency, warned people to be prepared. Early on February 12, 6,500 Duke Energy Progress customers in the Wilmington area had lost power. Winston-Salem had 8 inches (200 mm) of snow, the most in 15 years, but areas to the north and west had over twice that. Three people died in North Carolina. Two of those died in car accidents, one in Chatham County and one in Moore County. The other died from a falling branch in Pender County. 100,000 lost power in the state. On February 13, President Barack Obama declared South Carolina a disaster area after a petition from Governor Nikki Haley, making the state eligible for Federal Emergency Management Agency aid. Two and a half years, or 11 percent, of the state's timber was lost. The $360 million in damage was the worst for a storm since Hurricane Hugo in 1989. 15 percent of the damaged timber was salvaged, with 10 percent of value recovered.

=== Mid-Atlantic states ===
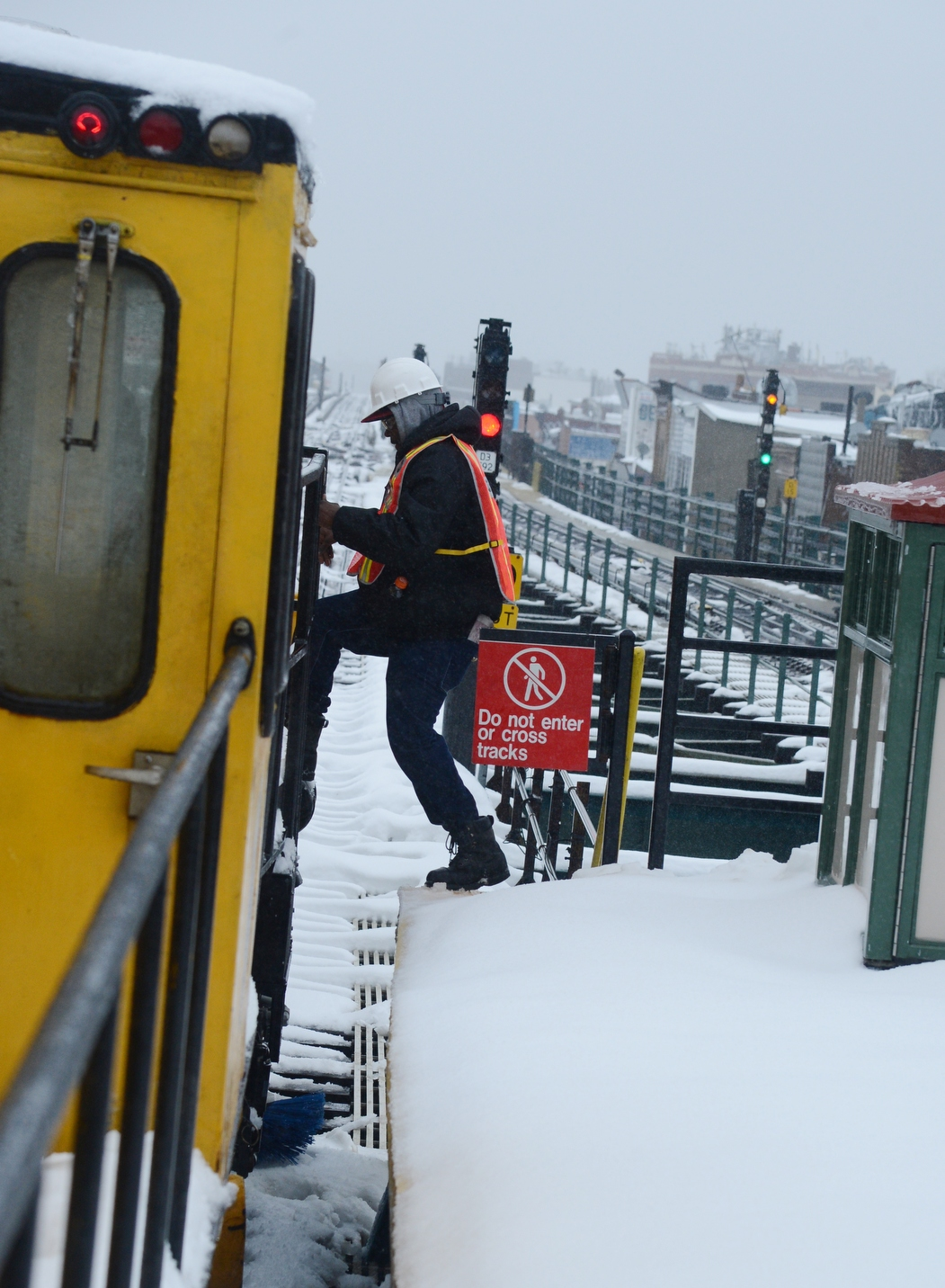
An MTA Supervisor boards a snow thrower on an elevated subway line in Brooklyn on February 13.

==== Virginia and Maryland ====
Baltimore had 15 inches (38 cm) of snow, and parts of Washington, D.C. recorded 15 inches, with nearby areas in Maryland reporting 19 inches (48 cm) or more, resulting in the shutdown of the federal government and the capital's two airports.

The fishing pier in Ocean City, Maryland, which had seen extensive damage from Hurricane Sandy, was damaged again in the storm. Strong waves and wind snapped seven pilings at the end of the pier.

The heavy snow from the storm contributed to roof collapses in several states. The roof caved in at a BP gas station in Roanoke, Virginia, and at a Shell gas station in Richmond, Virginia.

==== Pennsylvania, New Jersey and New York ====
Following a partial collapse, 100 people had to be evacuated from the studios of NBC Lancaster, Pennsylvania affiliate WGAL, and the station was unable to transmit live for an undetermined length of time. The event set a record in the Philadelphia region, where 9 inches (23 cm) of snow fell, as it marked the fourth snowstorm resulting in 6 inches (15 cm) of snow or greater in one winter. On the morning of February 14, up to 100 vehicles were involved in multiple accidents on the eastbound lanes of the Pennsylvania Turnpike between Willow Grove and Bensalem from icy conditions. One accident involved about 75 vehicles, while another incident further east involved about 30 vehicles. There were a total of 30 injuries.

The roof and walls of a ShopRite supermarket in New Milford, New Jersey, collapsed under the weight of several feet of snow. Also in New Jersey, an elementary school in Wallington, a department store in Woodland Park, and a sports complex in Waldwick, were among at least a dozen buildings across Bergen and Passaic counties that partially collapsed on February 14. No major injuries were reported in any of the incidents.

New York City recorded 13 inches (33 cm). Many flights were delayed or outright cancelled and multiple road closures were reported in the city. The snow added to what was one of the top snowiest winters in New York City on record.

== Snowfall accumulation totals ==
Note: Click "Show" to view table

State	City/location	Amount (inches)
WV	Grant County	27.5
NY	Albany County	27.0
MD	Glyndon	26.0
NY	Columbia County	25.0
WV	Pendleton County	25.0
MD	Westminster	24.8
PA	Somerset	22.5
MD	Frostburg	22.0
MD	Damascus	21.3
MA	Becket	21.0
VA	Roanoke	21.0
MD	Frederick	20.5
VT	Stamford	20.8
VA	Warren County	20.5
PA	York County	20.0
VA	Winchester	20.0
NY	Greene County	19.5
PA	Allentown	19.2
VA	Leesburg	18.2
VA	Charlottesville	18.0
WV	Harpers Ferry	18.0
NJ	Morris County	17.3
MD	Baltimore	17.1
MD	Laurel	16.6
CT	Fairfield	16.2
MD	Hagerstown	16.2
PA	Hazleton	16.0
WV	Martinsburg	16.0
NJ	East Rutherford	15.5
DE	Newark	14.5
VA	Dulles International Airport	13.3
NC	Asheville	12.5
NY	Central Park	12.5
NJ	Camden County	12.1
DE	New Castle Airport	12.5
PA	Huntingdon	12.0
PA	Philadelphia International Airport	11.5
GA	Catoosa County	11.0
DC	Washington	8.6
ME	Lewiston	10.0
PA	Scranton	8.3
NC	Winston-Salem	8.0
NC	Greensboro	7.0
NH	Portsmouth	7.0
NH	Concord	6.6
TN	Cumberland County	6.0
NY	Syracuse	5.4
AL	Huntsville International Airport	3.9

Source: National Weather Service (Unofficial Totals as of 2/15/2014)

== See also ==
- Blizzard
- Nor'easter
- List of Regional Snowfall Index Category 4 winter storms
- 2013–14 North American winter
- Early 2014 North American cold wave
- November 13–21, 2014 North American winter storm
- February 2007 North America blizzard
