= 2014 North American cold wave =

2014 North American cold wave may refer to:

- Early 2014 North American cold wave - Persistent cold wave throughout the first three months of 2014, bringing extended cold into the Eastern and Central United States
- November 2014 North American cold wave - Cold wave that brought record cold November temperatures across parts of the nation
