= 2013–14 North American winter =

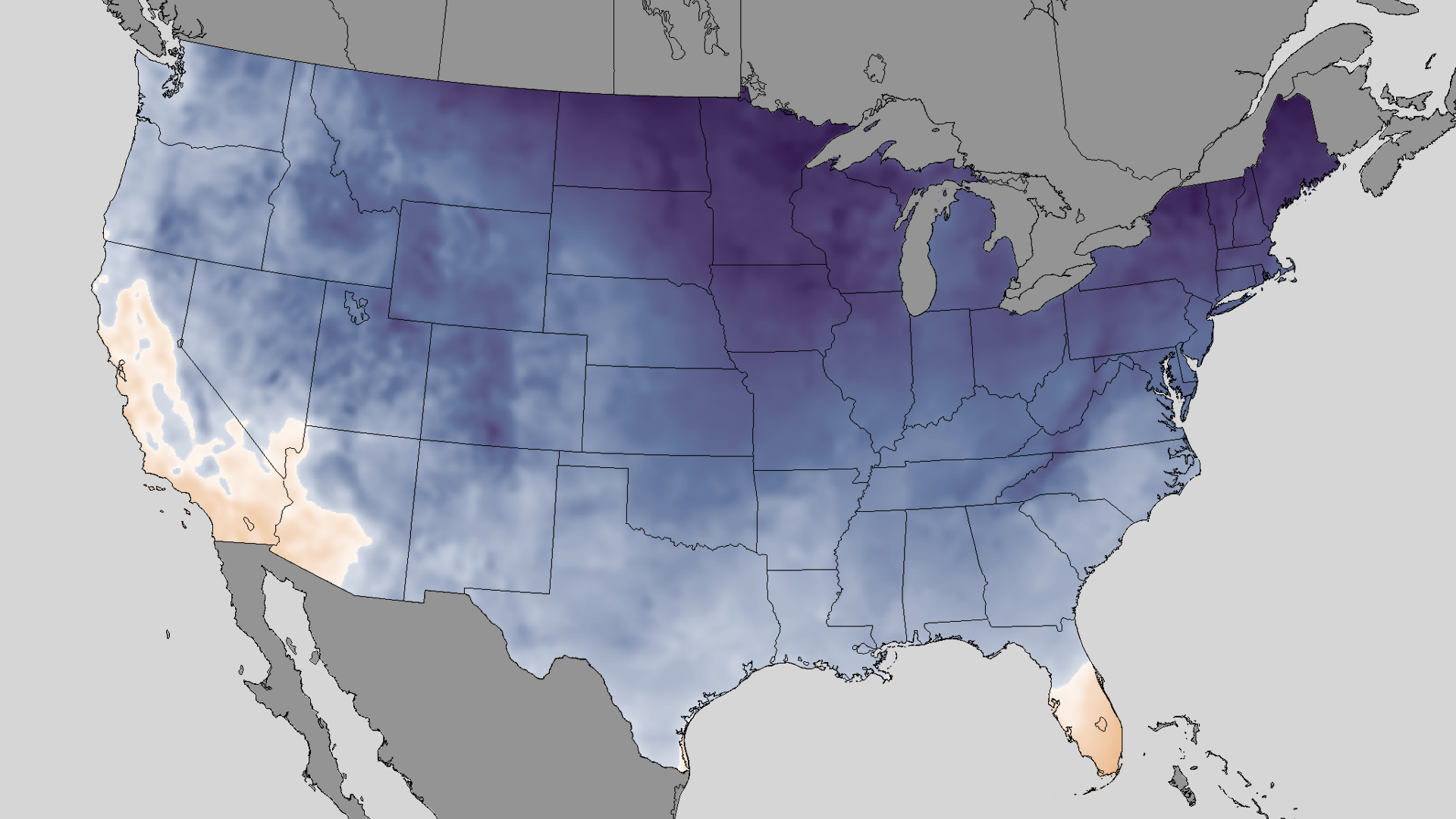
- A temperature map of the frigid conditions in the United States on January 2–4, 2014

Seasonal boundaries
- Meteorological winter: December 1 – February 28
- Astronomical winter: December 21 – March 20
- First event started: October 3, 2013
- Last event concluded: May 13, 2014

Most notable event
- Name: February 2014 nor'easter
  - Duration: February 11–24, 2014
  - Lowest pressure: 968 mb (28.59 inHg)
  - Fatalities: 22 total
  - Damage: >$750 million (2014 USD)

Seasonal statistics
- Total WPC-issued storms: 27 total (record high)
- Rated storms (RSI) (Cat. 1+): 11 total
- Major storms (RSI) (Cat. 3+): 2 total
- Maximum snowfall accumulation: 58 in (150 cm) in Lead, South Dakota (October 3–7, 2013)
- Maximum ice accretion: 1.2 in (30 mm) near Toronto, Canada (December 19–23, 2013)
- Total fatalities: 134 total
- Total damage: >$5.119–5.315 billion (2014 USD)

Related articles
- 2013–14 Atlantic winter storms in Europe

The 2013–14 North American winter was extremely active, deadly, record-breaking and bitterly cold for the United States and North America as a whole, due in part to the collapse of the polar vortex in November 2013, which allowed very cold air to travel down into the United States, leading to an extended period of very cold temperatures. The pattern continued mostly uninterrupted throughout the winter and numerous significant winter storms affected the Eastern United States. The Weather Prediction Center (WPC) tracked a total of 27 significant winter storms from November to May, underlining the hyperactivity during the winter months. Several of these events included a massive storm complex that affected most of the country and Canada before Christmas, two separate blizzards that affected the Northeast during the month of January with up to 1 foot (12 in; 30 cm) of snow, and a rare Gulf Coast winter storm. The most notable of these events ended up being a powerful winter storm and nor’easter that dumped ice and snow in the Southeastern United States and the Northeastern United States in mid-February. Most of the cold weather abated by the end of March, though a few winter storms did affect the Western United States towards the end of the winter.

Due to the polar vortex phenomenon, a majority of the United States had one of their coldest and snowiest years on record, particularly in cities east of the Mississippi River, as a result of several storms taking a favorable path through the Northeast and along the coastline, supplied by plentiful cold air. The city of Detroit ended up having its snowiest winter on record. Additionally, arctic air plunged south enough that areas along the Gulf Coast of the United States experienced wintry precipitation, which is a rarity and left many citizens unprepared there as a result. Collectively, the wintry weather resulted in approximately 134 deaths in total across the continent, with damage estimated to be over US$5 billion (2014 USD).

While there is no well-agreed-upon date used to indicate the start of winter in the Northern Hemisphere, there are two definitions of winter which may be used. Based on the astronomical definition, winter begins at the winter solstice, which in 2013 occurred on December 21, and ends at the March equinox, which in 2014 occurred on March 20. Based on the meteorological definition, the first day of winter is December 1 and the last day February 28. Both definitions involve a period of approximately three months, with some variability.

== Seasonal forecasts ==
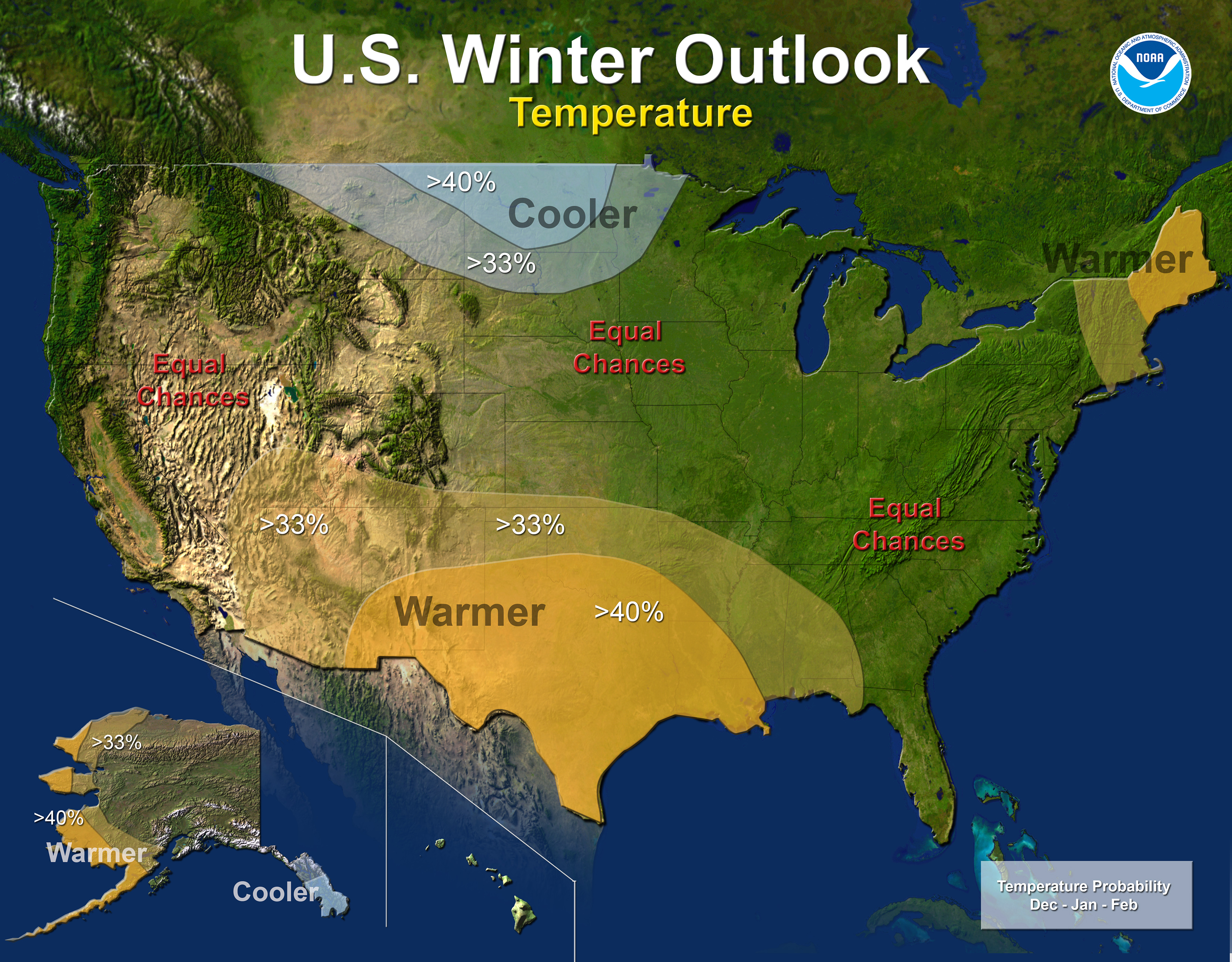
Temperature outlook

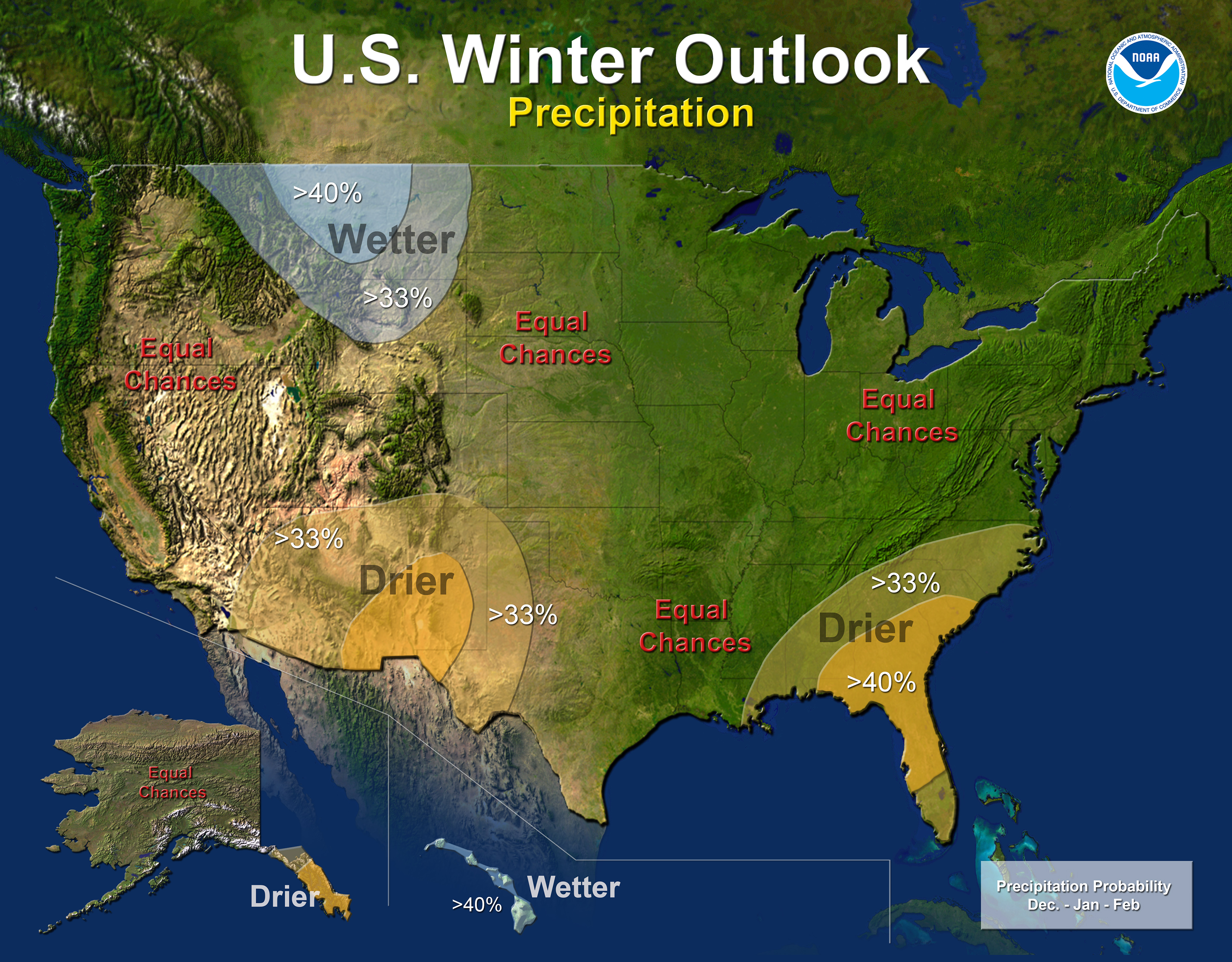
Precipitation outlook

On November 21, 2013, the National Oceanic and Atmospheric Administration's Climate Prediction Center issued its U.S. Winter Outlook. Sea surface temperatures had been near average since spring 2012, and forecasters expected these conditions to continue through winter 2013–14, with neither El Niño nor La Niña conditions expected to affect the season's climate. In the outlook, little rainfall was anticipated in the Southwestern United States, and the development of drought was expected in the Southeastern United States. Below-average levels of precipitation and below-average temperatures were expected in the Alaskan panhandle. Below-average temperatures were also favored in the Northern Plains, while above-average temperatures were favored in New England, the South-Central, Southeastern, and Southwestern United States, and western Alaska. The remainder of the country fell into the outlook's "equal chance" category, with an equal chance of above-average, below-average, and near-average temperatures and/or precipitation.

== Seasonal summary ==
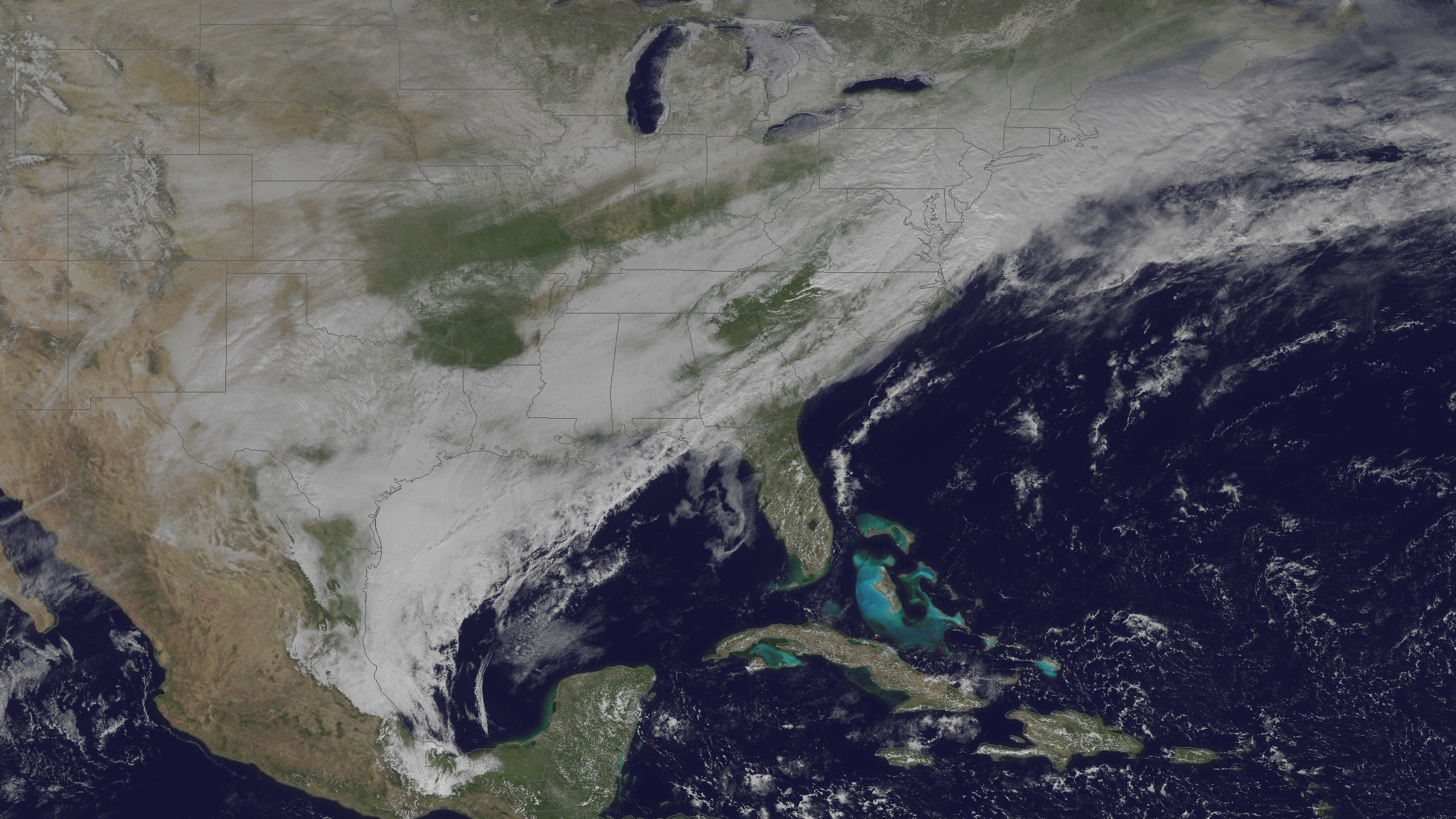
A winter storm impacts the Northeastern United States on February 3

The 2013–14 winter season was characterized by prolonged periods of extremely cold temperatures across the eastern half of United States, as well as numerous high-impact winter storms, caused by a persistent pattern of strong mid-level ridging over the western half of the continent and mid-level troughiness over the eastern half – due in part to the weakening of the phenomenon known as the polar vortex. Many areas saw some of their coldest temperatures in decades or broke said records. Additionally, notable events and below-average temperatures continued well into March and past the official end of winter, with total damages as a result of the winter weather and cold temperatures exceeding $5 billion. Significant winter weather events began early, with a major storm system affecting the Great Plains and Deep South in early October. Some of the mountainous areas received nearly 4 feet (48 in; 120 cm) of snow along with gusty winds creating blizzard conditions, while a significant tornado outbreak occurred further southeast in the warm sector. The system was followed by the dissipating Tropical Storm Karen, whose remnants went on to develop into a nor'easter along the Northeastern U.S. coastline. Afterwards, little activity occurred until mid-November, where an arctic front brought the first snowfall and cold temperatures to much of the Northeastern United States. Shortly before and throughout the Thanksgiving holiday, a widespread and large winter storm caused numerous impacts in areas ranging from the Texas panhandle to the interior Northeastern U.S., with heavy snow totals and ice accumulations occurring in the state; the same storm would then bring mostly rain to the Northeast. December would begin with two winter storms impacting the contiguous U.S., accompanied with another arctic front that ushered in frigid air and led to record low temperatures for December in roughly half of the country. Snow cover reached from the Plains to the Ohio Valley, one of the most expansive for the month of December. Another winter storm on December 8 and 9 would bring moderate snowfall to more of the Mid-Atlantic states. The first significant winter storm for the Northeast occurred by mid-month, with a coastal low developing close to the Mid-Atlantic, bringing significant snowfall to parts of the Northeast and New England. Following a brief warm-up that occurred afterwards, from December 20–22, a massive winter storm developed in the central U.S. out of an upper-level low, bringing a trio of different weather conditions, with blizzard conditions from the Plains to Upper Midwest, a severe weather outbreak and flooding in the Southern states, and a crippling ice storm in Canada that was responsible for at least 29 deaths. Activity then quieted down until the end of the year.

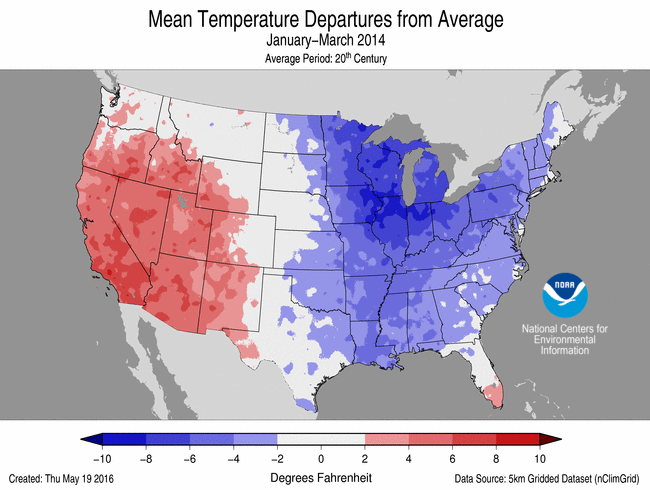
Average temperature anomaly for the months of January to March in the United States

January opened with a significant pattern change that would later go on to define the rest of the winter season. A significant blizzard struck the Ohio Valley, Mid-Atlantic and Northeast on January 2–3 as it re-developed off the coast as a strong nor'easter, bringing as much as 12–18 inches (30–46 cm) of snow across much of the affected regions, causing significant disruptions and at least 11 deaths. The storm also traveled along an arctic front that brought extremely cold temperatures across the eastern half of the United States in its aftermath. A second, more powerful winter storm followed days later on January 6 and ushered in the coldest temperatures of the winter season and breaking hundreds of records as a result. Business, school, and road closures were common, as well as mass flight cancellations across some airports in the Midwest. Altogether, more than 200 million people were affected, in an area ranging from the Rocky Mountains to the Atlantic Ocean and extending south to include roughly 187 million residents of the Continental United States. On January 21–22, another major blizzard struck the Mid-Atlantic and Northeast, with snowfall up to and over 1 foot (12 in) occurring in a corridor stretching from Philadelphia to Boston, in addition to blizzard conditions occurring in several regions, causing one death. Very cold temperatures followed the storm as well. Several days later, a strong arctic front pushed far south into the Deep South of the U.S., leading to the development of a winter storm along the Gulf Coast, bringing a combination of record-breaking cold temperatures to cities not usually acquainted to them and wintry precipitation that caused gridlock in cities like Atlanta, Georgia due to the unprecedented nature of the system. 13 deaths occurred as a result of the rare winter storm.

== Events ==
There were several winter weather events during the 2013–14 North American winter. Significant events include cold waves, snowstorms, and other notable events outside the conventional limits of winter.

=== Early October blizzard ===
- Category 3 "Major" (RSI/NOAA: 9.78)
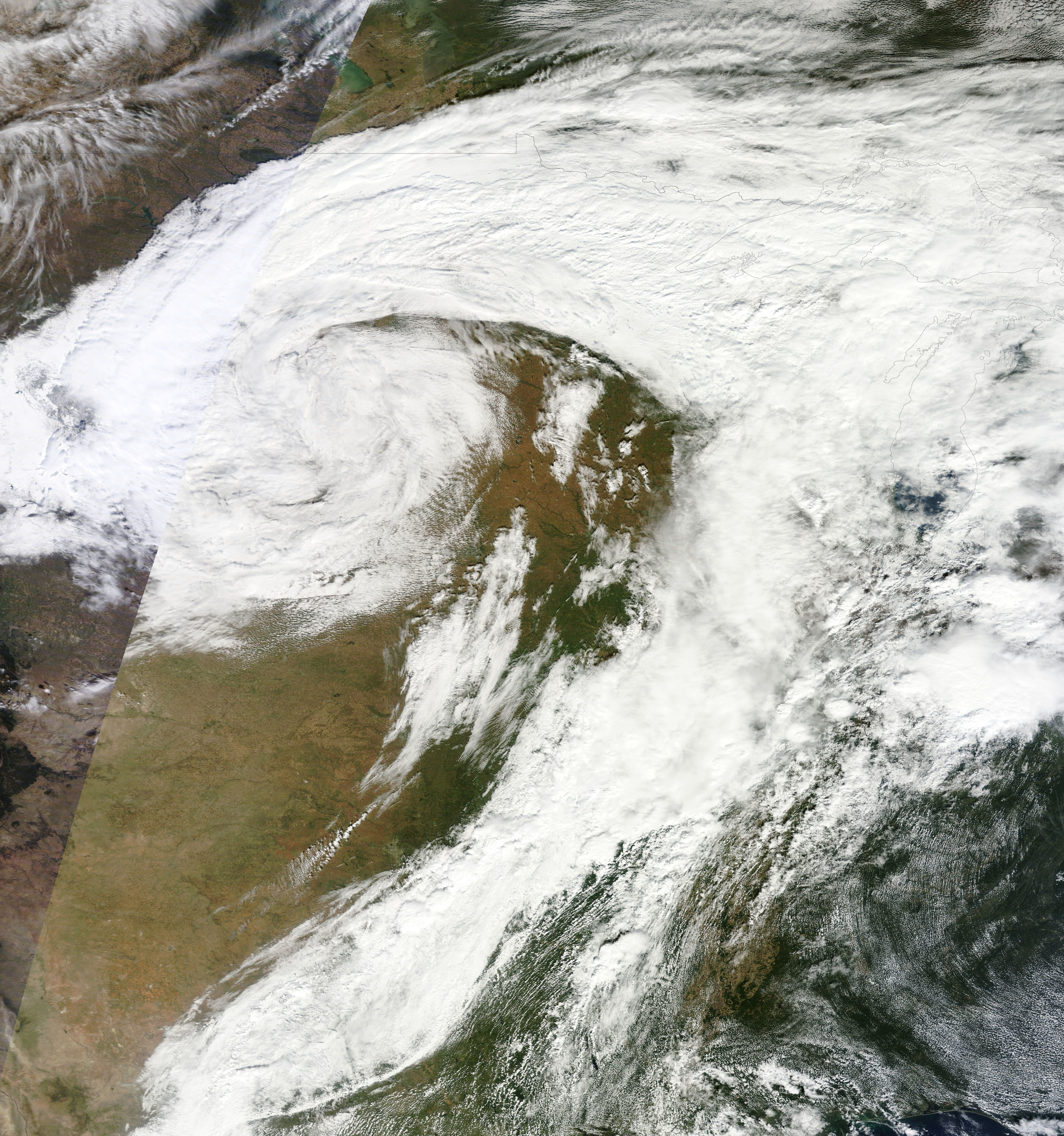
- Duration: October 3 – October 8, 2013
- Lowest pressure: 1000 mb (29.53 inHg)
- Maximum snow: 58 in (150 cm)
- Fatalities: 3 fatalities
- Damage: $100 million (2013 USD)

The first winter storm of the season, a significant system, was forecast by the National Weather Service, which issued a blizzard warning on October 3 preceding the storm. The storm occurred as an early season blizzard, and, according to the Weather Prediction Center, was an event of a magnitude unseen for the past decade. Many locations in Colorado, Nebraska, Montana, Wyoming, North Dakota, and South Dakota received near or over 10 inches (25 cm) of snow. Some areas in South Dakota received nearly 4 feet (1.2 m) of snow, with Silver City receiving 47 inches (120 cm). In many locations, there were high winds of over 50 miles per hour (80 km/h), with some locations reporting winds of nearly hurricane force, being 74 miles per hour (119 km/h).

=== Post-Tropical Cyclone Karen ===
- Category 0 "Nuisance" (RSI/NOAA: N/A)
- Duration: October 8 – October 15, 2013
- Fatalities: 3 fatalities
- Damage: $5,000 (2013 USD)

The remnants of Tropical Storm Karen developed into a nor'easter that ended up affecting the Northeastern United States. The nor'easter generated high wind gusts, heavy rain, and coastal flooding in New Jersey. In Ocean County, minor flooding associated with high tides was reported on Long Beach Boulevard in Beach Haven, along with Long Beach Island. Seaside Park and Lacey Township also experienced minor tidal flooding. At Harvey Cedars, wind gusts of at least 30 mph (48 km/h) were recorded for a record 79 consecutive hours, beginning at 3:00 a.m. EDT on October 9 and ending at 10:00 a.m. EDT on October 12.

In neighboring Delaware, similar coastal flooding and strong wind gusts affected coastal parts of all three counties. Delaware State University cancelled some outdoor activities scheduled for the October 11 and 12. In Sussex County, Long Neck, and the surrounding areas experienced tidal flooding. Roadway tidal flooding occurred in and around Angola and Oak Orchard. Strong waves pushed water over bulkheads. In Milton, minor tidal flooding closed Prime Hook Road for several days. The Delaware Department of Transportation helped residents living along the road reach or exit their homes. Peak gusts were all located in Sussex County: 50 mph (80 km/h) at Dewey Beach, 49 mph (79 km/h) in Lewes, and 39 mph (63 km/h) in Indian River. The strong winds blew sand into the left lane of northbound Delaware Route 1, near the Indian River Inlet Bridge.

=== US Thanksgiving Week storm complex ===
- Category 1 "Notable" (RSI/NOAA: 1.466)
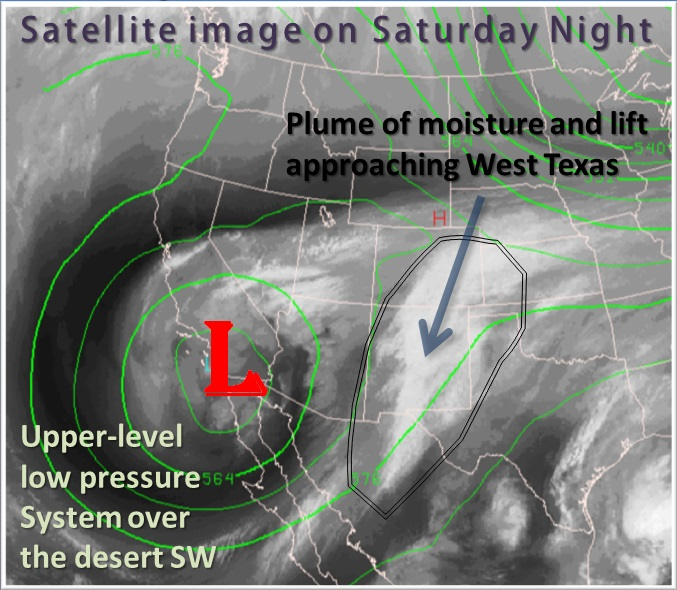
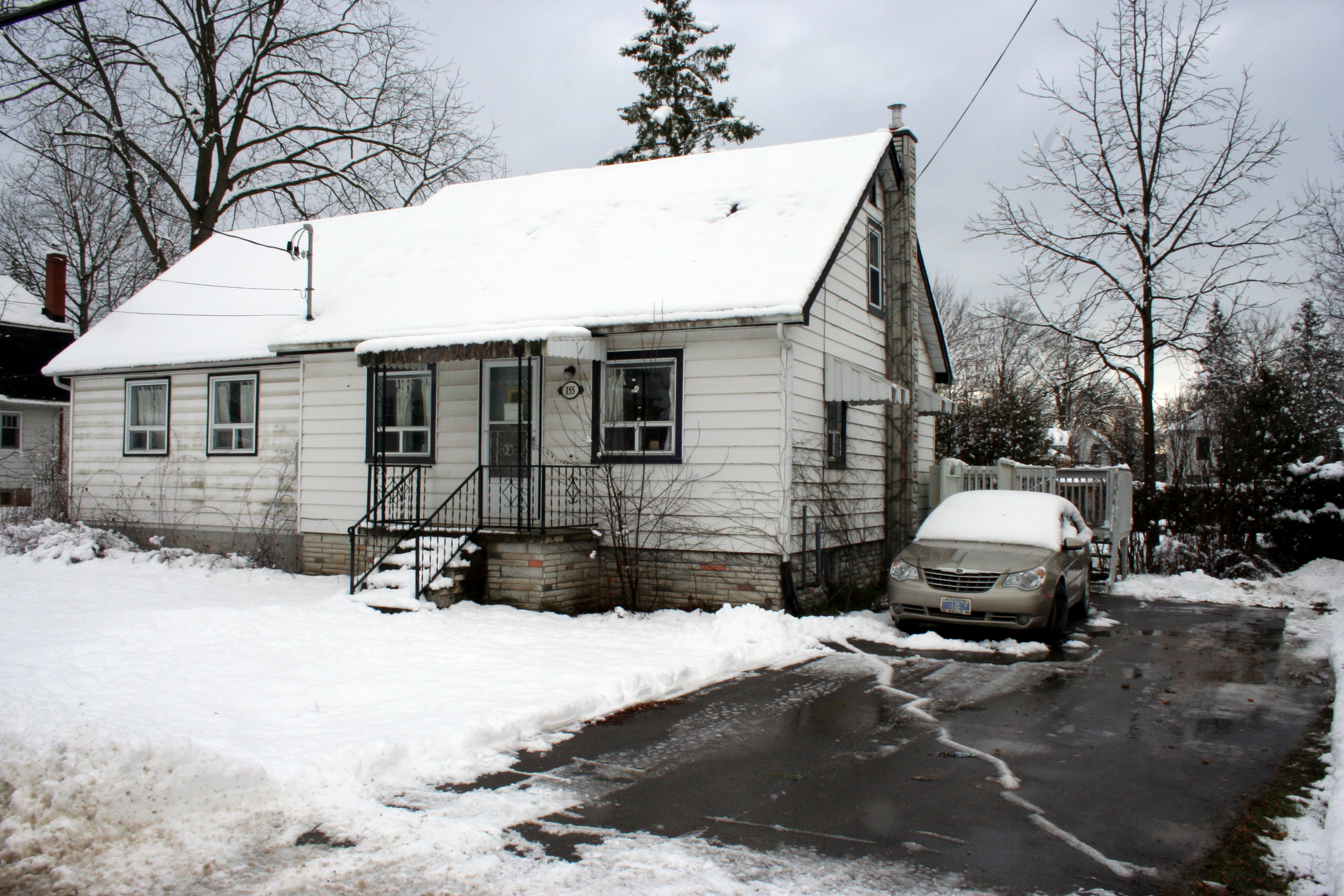
- Duration: November 22 – November 27, 2013
- Lowest pressure: 968 mb (28.59 inHg)
- Maximum snow: 48 in (120 cm)
- Fatalities: 13 (+3 indirect) fatalities
- Damage: $10.6 million (2013 USD)

On November 22, an upper-level trough located over northern California moved southward offshore the southern California coast, with its pressure deepening to a closed low-pressure area and also was cut off from the main upper-level jet. Mixed precipitation developed ahead of an occluded front that was attached to the low, causing impacts across the Western United States. The low-pressure area initially remained nearly stationary; however the low weakened and moved eastward across California and Arizona, while producing snow across southern portions of California and Nevada. The low then dissipated along a surface front, though an upper-level vortex produced mixed precipitation ahead of the vortex across areas from Arizona to Texas. The upper-level low-pressure area then ejected into the southern Great Plains on November 25, as the precipitation associated with the upper-level low began to organize into a linear structure. A low-pressure area then formed in the Gulf of Mexico on November 26 and began interacting with the upper-level low, as, at the same time, a phase began between the upper-level low and a northern stream system. As a result, a broad area of ascent developed across the Eastern United States. A southerly low-level jet across the Southeastern United States pulled moisture into the East Coast of the United States, and, with the combination of the phased upper-level low and the moisture drawn from the southerly low-level jet, broadened a precipitation shield northeastward. Snow fell across the Northeastern United States and southeastern Canada on November 27 and 28.

The winter storm was responsible for at least 14 deaths. The Weather Channel meteorologist Jonathan Erdman described the storm as "about as expansive a winter storm as it get," On November 24, 2013, 300 flights were cancelled at Dallas/Fort Worth International Airport. Flagstaff, Arizona recorded 11 inches (28 cm) of snow, and near the Four Corners as much as 48 inches (120 cm) fell. As much as 12 inches (30 cm) of snow fell in Colorado and Utah, and 13 people had died as of November 25. The serious winter storm that was expected did not materialize. As of November 27, 2013, 475 flights had been cancelled, with 3,600 delays, many in the New York City and Philadelphia areas. Snow turned to rain in Pittsburgh despite an ominous forecast, but 9 inches (23 cm) fell in Mercer County, Pennsylvania, and 4.5 inches (11 cm) in Buffalo. Atlanta had less than an inch of snow, but it was the third November snow since 1930. Morehead City, North Carolina had serious damage, and damage was also reported in Atlantic Beach, North Carolina, from an EF2 tornado.

=== December cold wave ===
On December 1, 2013, the weakening of the polar vortex led to the beginning of an abnormally cold trend in the Eastern and Central United States. On December 6, the continued deterioration of the polar vortex led to the jet stream pushing southward, bringing record cold temperatures across the Eastern U.S. During the cold wave, which extended from December 6–10, over 150 daily precipitation records and close to 100 daily snowfall records were broken across the northeastern, southeastern and south central United States. Jordan, Montana dipped down to −42 °F (−41 °C) on the morning of December 7, and Great Falls, Montana dipped down to −33 °F (−36 °C), the coldest so early in the season. Eugene, Oregon had their second snowiest December day on record. Several cities had 3+ days of record lows. On December 4, the record low on December 4 in Denver of −13 °F (−25 °C) broke the record by 8 °F (4 °C). Burns, Oregon saw an all-time record low of −30 °F (−34 °C). Numerous airline flights were canceled and there were reports of power outages. The cold blast led to a monthly average temperature of only 7.5 °F (−13.6 °C) in Rhinelander, Wisconsin, the 8th coldest December for the site on record.

=== Early December winter storm ===
- Category 2 "Significant" (RSI/NOAA: 3.83)
- Duration: December 2 – December 4, 2013
- Lowest pressure: 994 mb (29.35 inHg)
- Maximum snow: 33.2 in (84 cm)

On December 2, a Pacific storm system entered the Western United States, and it spread heavy rain and snow from the Pacific coast to the Rocky Mountains. As the storm continued to move east, high snow totals fell in its wake. Maximum reported snowfall totals in this area were found to have occurred in Idaho, Wyoming, and Montana, where 30 inches (76 cm) or greater were reported. High winds were widespread as well, with multiple locations in the mountainous regions of the western US reporting winds of greater than 60 miles per hour (97 km/h). As reported by the National Weather Service's Weather Prediction Center, the surface low reached its peak strength at approximately 6:00 UTC on December 3 while it was over western Wyoming, where a central pressure of 994 hectopascals (994 mbar; 29.4 inHg) was observed.

=== Pre-Christmas storm complex ===
- Category 0 "Nuisance" (RSI/NOAA: N/A)
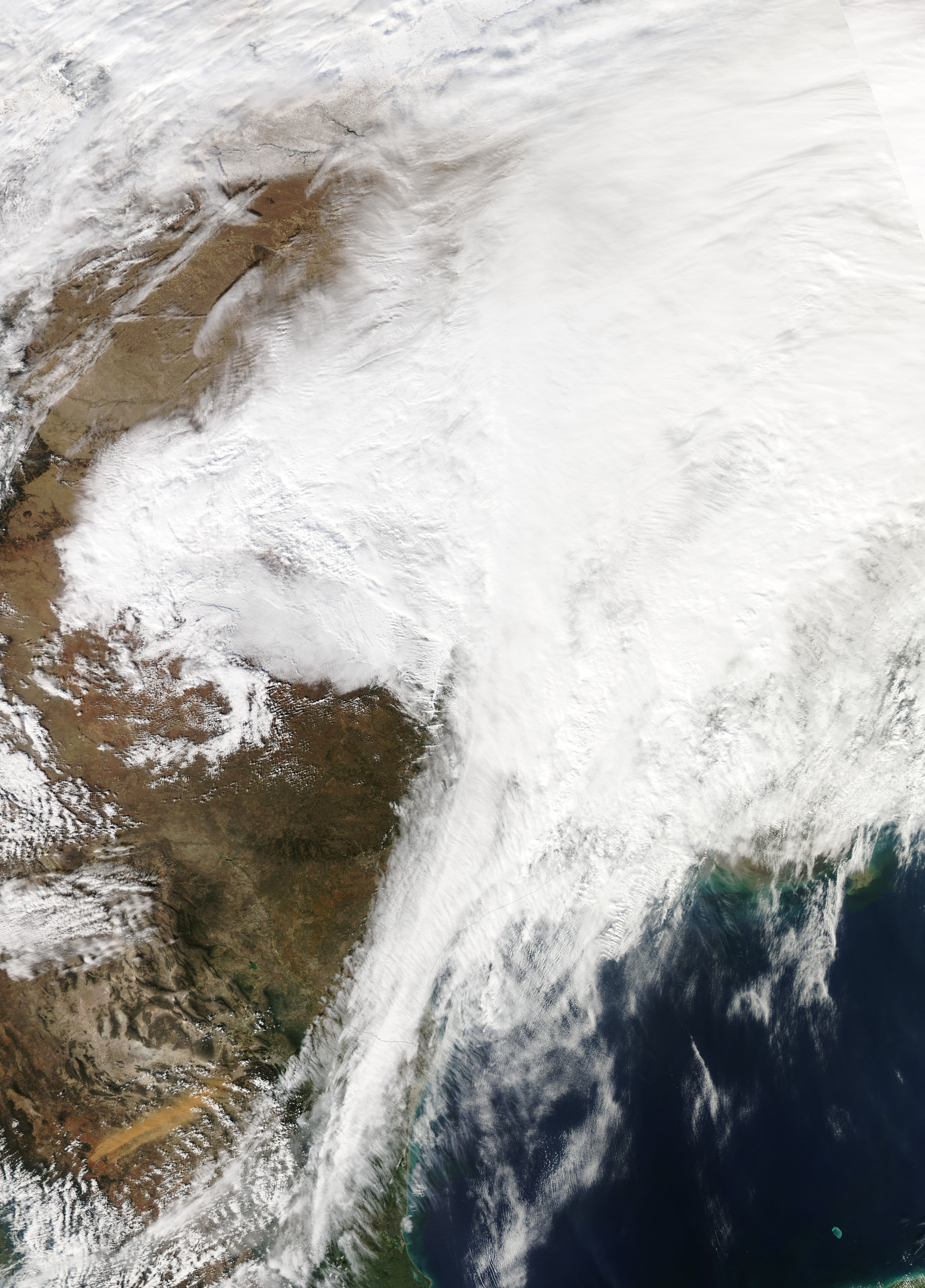
- Duration: December 19 – December 23, 2013
- Lowest pressure: 997 mb (29.44 inHg)
- Maximum snow: 25.2 in (64 cm)
- Fatalities: 29 fatalities

On December 19, a strong cold front moved southward across much of the Great Plains. By daybreak on December 20, temperatures in many parts of Oklahoma had dropped to mostly between 10 and 30 °F (−12 and −1 °C). However, despite the freezing temperatures, the depth of the cold air was rather shallow, with a depth of generally no more than 1,500 feet (460 m). As a result of the shallow depth of the front, once the front reached parts of the higher terrain in northwestern Arkansas, the front stalled, leaving areas just ahead of the front significantly colder than areas behind it. While temperatures in much of the Plains remained at or below freezing, an upper low was forming over the Southwestern United States. As the low pushed eastward and northeastward across parts of eastern New Mexico and West Texas, it interacted with moisture over the Southern Plains; there was an unusually high amount of moisture across the area for December, and the low drew much of it over the cold air-mass near the surface. With the moisture in place, light rain began to fall in some locations prior to sunset. The rain persisted and spread from southwest to northeast overnight, with moderate rain beginning to fall across much of Southwest, Central, and northeastern Oklahoma and Southeast Kansas. By late morning on December 21, much of the rain had ended in Southwest and Central Oklahoma, where many areas had received over 0.25 inches (0.64 cm) of ice accumulation with some locations receiving over 0.50 inches (1.3 cm) or even, in localized areas, 0.75 inches (1.9 cm) of ice; isolated power outages occurred, and multiple trees and tree limbs were broken and/or pulled down by the weight of the ice. Heavy icing continued along the Interstate 44 corridor and parts of Osage County in Oklahoma; in these areas, there were reports of 0.50–0.75 inches (1.3–1.9 cm) of ice, and in southeastern Oklahoma and extreme northwestern Arkansas, there were lesser reports of 0.25–0.50 inches (0.64–1.27 cm) of ice. Additional ice totals occurred in Southeast Kansas, where there were isolated locations which received ice accumulations of as high as 0.75 inches (1.9 cm).

=== Early January blizzard ===
- Category 2 "Significant" (RSI/NOAA: 3.22)
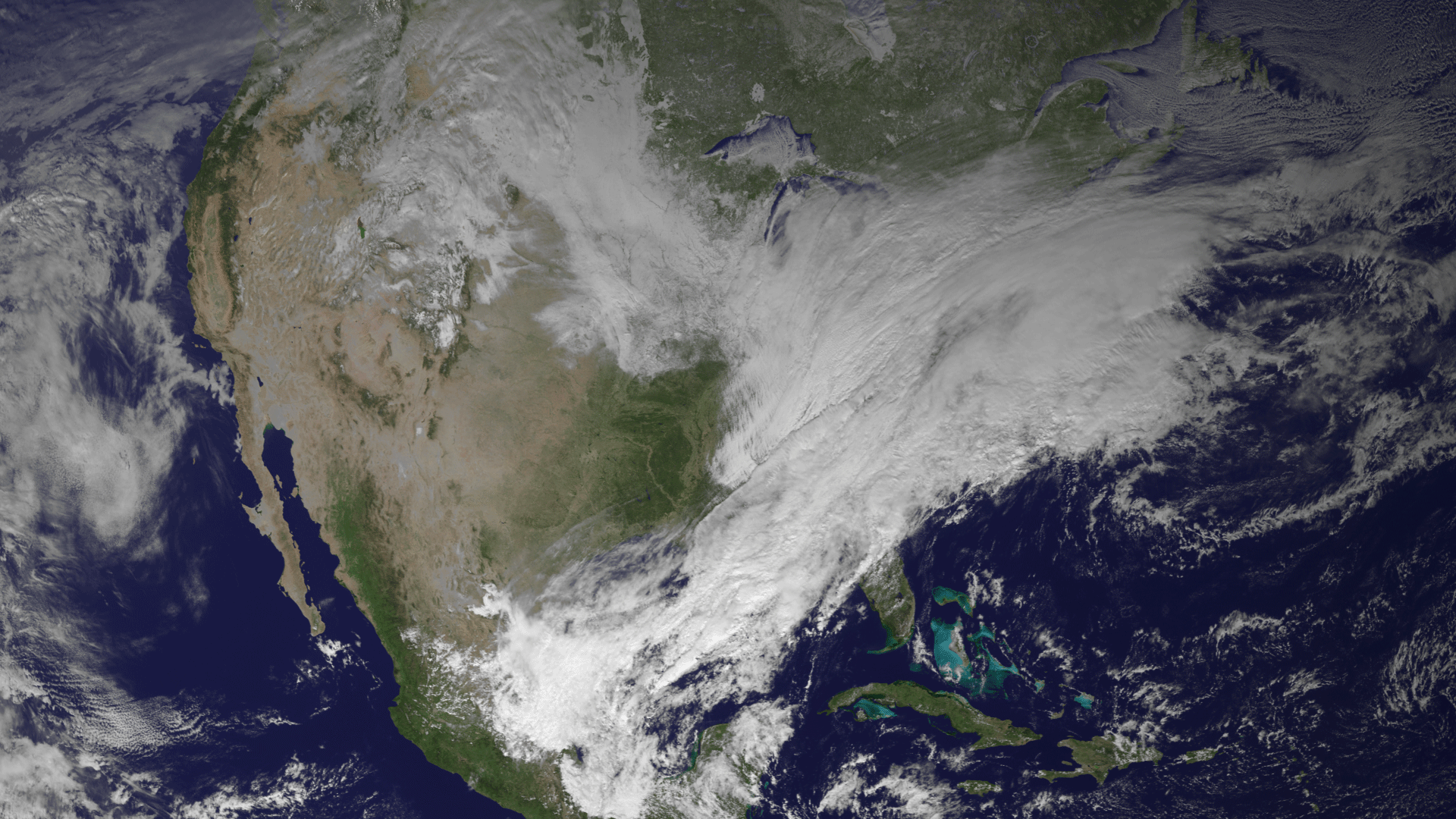
- Duration: December 30, 2013 – January 4, 2014
- Lowest pressure: 936 mb (27.64 inHg)
- Maximum snow: 23.8 in (60 cm)
- Fatalities: 1 fatalities
- Damage: $75 million (2014 USD)

On January 3, Boston had a temperature of 2 °F (−17 °C) with a −20 °F (−29 °C) wind chill, and over 7 inches (18 cm) of snow. Boxford, Massachusetts recorded 23.8 inches (60 cm). Fort Wayne, Indiana had a record low of −10 °F (−23 °C). In Michigan, over 11 inches (28 cm) of snow fell outside Detroit and temperatures around the state were near or below 0 °F (−18 °C). New Jersey had over 10 inches (25 cm) of snow, and schools and government offices closed. Over a dozen deaths were attributed to the cold wave, with dangerous roadway conditions and extreme cold cited as causes.

=== Early January Great Lakes winter storm ===
2014 began on an active note, with another major winter storm affecting much of the United States on January 6–7, days after the previous blizzard. Between 6 and 12 inches (150 and 300 mm) of snow fell with this system across a wide area spreading from central Missouri across Illinois and Indiana to Lower Michigan. Snowfall totals of near 18 inches (460 mm) were recorded across northern Indiana, and additional accumulations occurred downwind from the major Great Lakes. This storm was accompanied by some of the coldest temperatures to affect the Central and Eastern United States in 20 years. Upper flow which was meridional all the way up to the Arctic Circle provided a direct path for cold air advection to occur southward to the United States. The average temperature of the contiguous United States was 17.9 °F (−7.8 °C), the coldest day since January 12–13, 1997 and the 40th-coldest day in the United States since 1900. During the event, wind chills dropped as low as the -60s °F (-50s °C) across the Northern High Plains. The event was short-lived, with the portion of the polar vortex that had traveled across the Great Lakes lifting northeastward into Quebec soon after.

=== January–March cold wave ===
Following the initial cold blast in early January, multiple periods of extended cold, some with record-low temperatures, continued throughout much of the remaining winter into early to late March. The NOAA's National Climatic Data Center found that since modern records began in 1895, the period from December 2013 through February 2014 was the 34th-coldest such period for the contiguous 48 states as a whole. They also found 91% of the Great Lakes were iced over, the second highest percentage on record. Ice on the Great Lakes did not fully melt until early June. That was the latest date of ice on the Great Lakes ever.

The average temperature for the contiguous U.S. during the winter season was 31.3 °F (−0.4 °C), one degree below the 20th-century average, and the number of daily record-low temperatures outnumbered the number of record-high temperatures nationally in early 2014.

=== Late January blizzard ===
- Category 1 "Notable" (RSI/NOAA: 1.29)
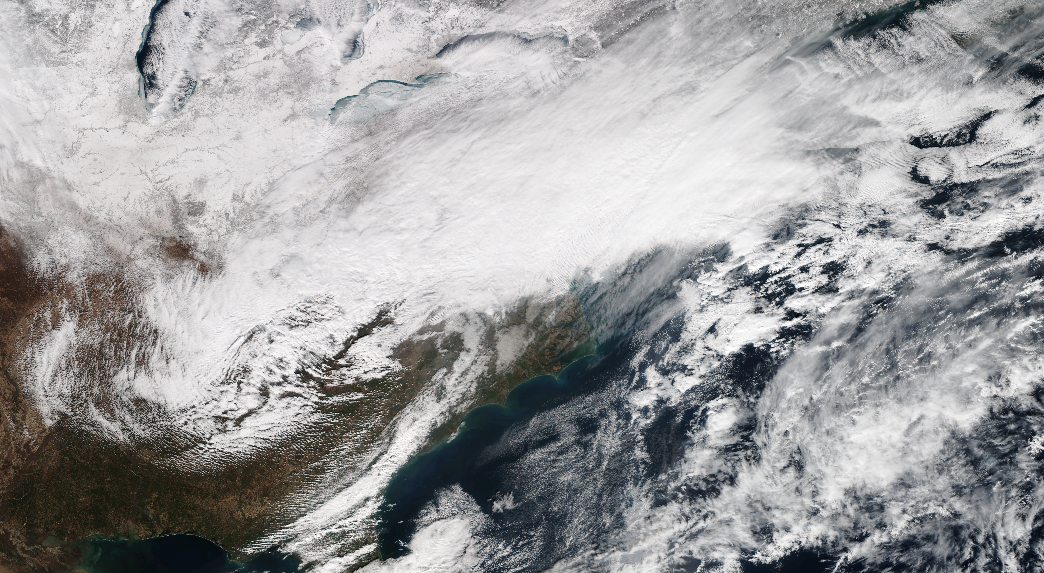
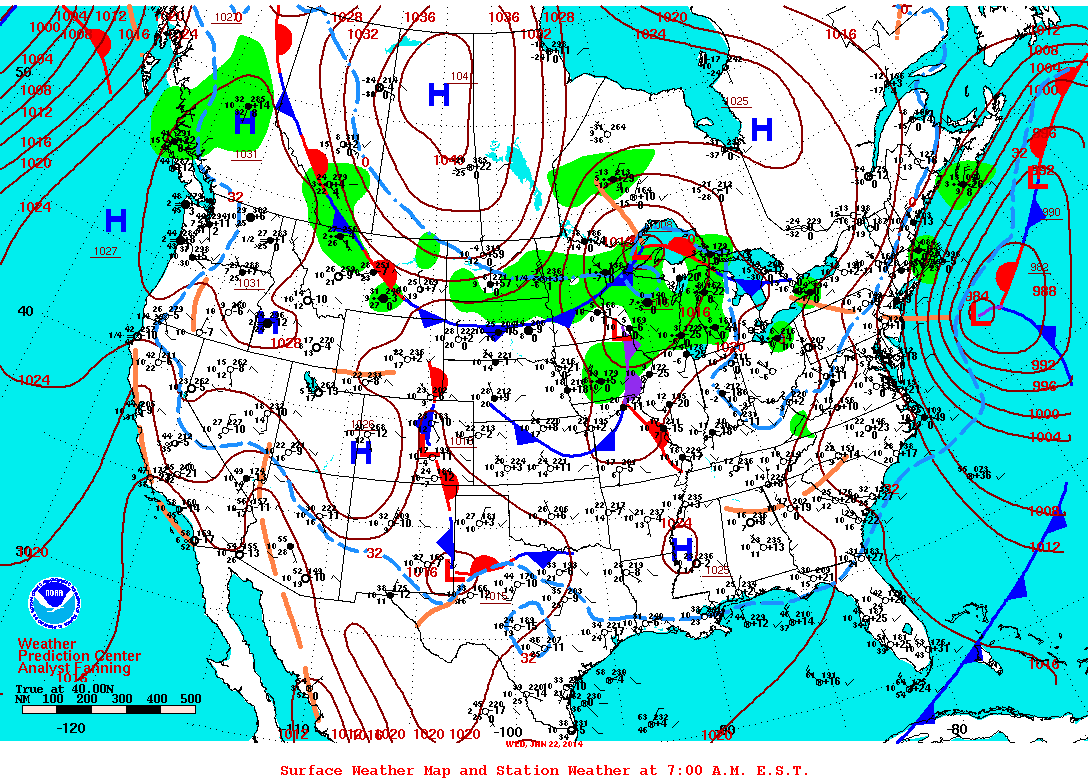
- Duration: January 20 – January 22, 2014
- Lowest pressure: 962 mb (28.41 inHg)
- Maximum snow: 18.3 in (46 cm)
- Fatalities: 1 fatalities

On January 19, a weak Alberta clipper exited out of Canada, and quickly moved through the Upper Midwest on January 20, dropping little to no accumulations of snowfall. As it moved eastward early on January 21, frontogenesis occurred, and precipitation expanded from Indiana to western Pennsylvania. Then, as it neared the coast, a new area of low pressure developed off the Outer Banks and began to move northwards, as snowfall expanded into parts of the Mid-Atlantic; consequently, by 15:00 UTC on January 21, the Weather Prediction Center (WPC) initiated storm summary bulletins for the developing winter storm. A heavy band of precipitation set up from the cities of Philadelphia to New York City as a result of rapid deepening, leading to high snowfall rates along this corridor and the heaviest accumulations of the event.

Near-blizzard conditions occurred up and down the Interstate 95 corridor, with blizzard warnings issued for southeastern New England. The system, which was not well-forecast in advance and was stronger than anticipated by many, also struck at or near rush hour, which created hazardous conditions and impacts from Washington, D.C. to Boston. States of emergencies were declared in the states of New Jersey, Maryland and more due to the blizzard, which also caused thousands of flights nationwide to be either cancelled or delayed. At least one death was confirmed due to the storm, in Maryland. In the wake of the storm, bitterly cold temperatures pushed into the Northeast once again, causing dangerously low wind-chills.

=== Late January U.S. Gulf Coast winter storm ===
- Category 1 "Notable" (RSI/NOAA: 1.39)
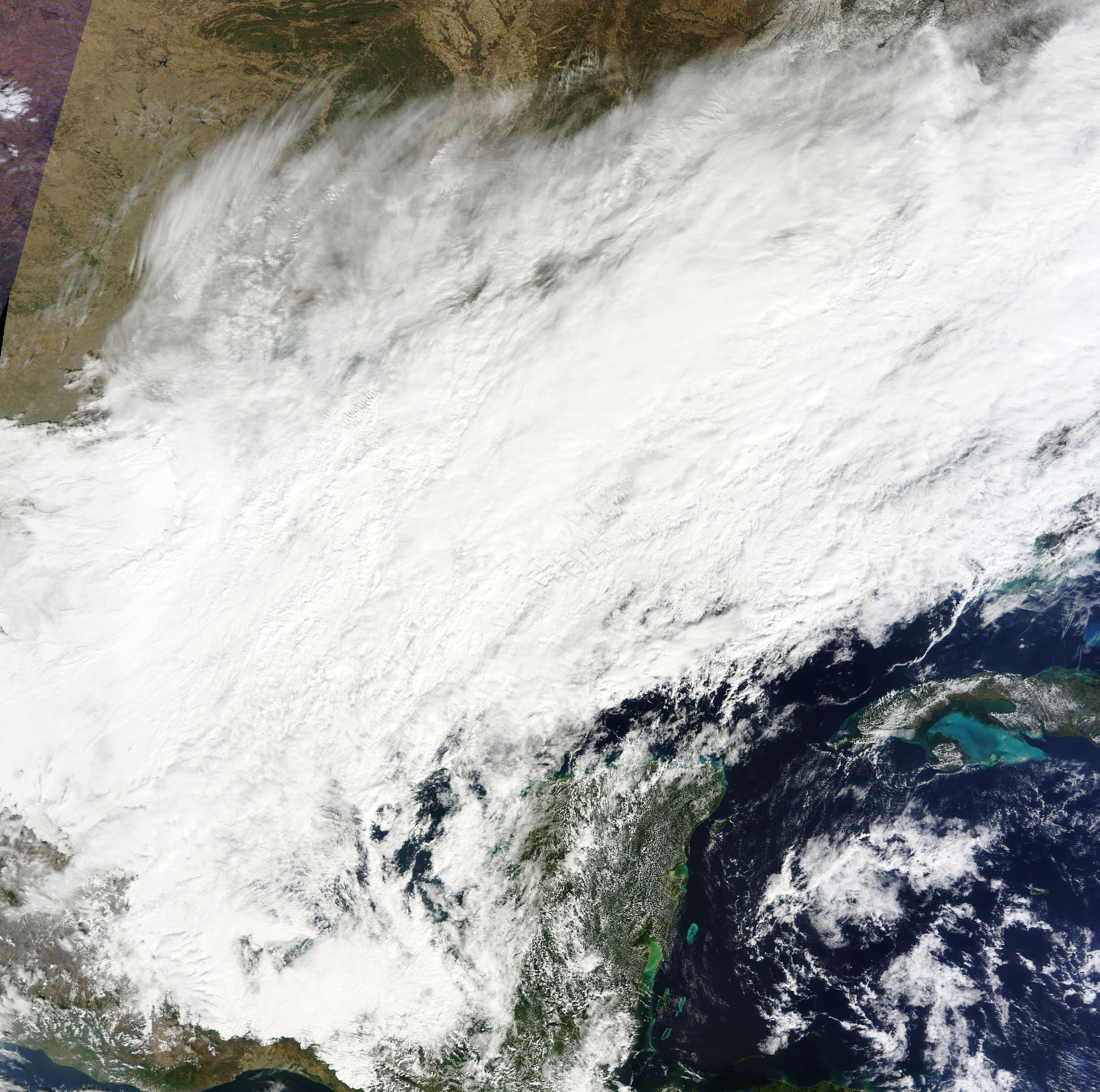
- Duration: January 27 – January 29, 2014
- Lowest pressure: 1008 mb (29.77 inHg)
- Maximum snow: 10 in (25 cm)
- Fatalities: 13 fatalities

Early on January 27, a cold front crossed into the Gulf of Mexico, with temperatures ahead of the front in Texas and Louisiana in the 60s °F (10s °C) dropping to below freezing only one day later. As this occurred, a southern stream upper-level trough translated in an eastward direction across northern parts of Mexico. This also coincided with the backing of low-level winds along the western Gulf Coast. Relatively warm and humid air overrode the colder air near the surface, resulting in precipitation falling in Texas, Louisiana, and parts of the Southeastern U.S. as a mixture of rain, freezing rain, and snow. Late in the day, a broad northern stream upper-level trough containing a trough axis was located over the Central and Eastern United States, and the storm began to develop as this trough axis, initially reaching from the Upper Midwest to the northern Rocky Mountains, sharpened and moved in a southeastward direction during the following 24-hour period. This activity coincided with the movement of additional cold air at the surface. Many areas experiencing liquid precipitation falling at the surface saw rain switch over to freezing rain by 12:00 UTC January 28 as temperatures dropped. A mixture of frozen to partly frozen precipitation spread eastward over the following period into the early hours of January 29, impacting much of the Deep South. Widespread ice accumulations in excess of .25 inches (6.4 mm) occurred as a result of the event. As the southern stream trough axis weakened while it moved eastward across the western Gulf of Mexico, a northern stream trough amplified as it headed toward the Southeastern U.S. Overrunning wintry precipitation affected the area as a weak surface low traveled along the front and crossed into the Atlantic.

=== Early February winter storms ===
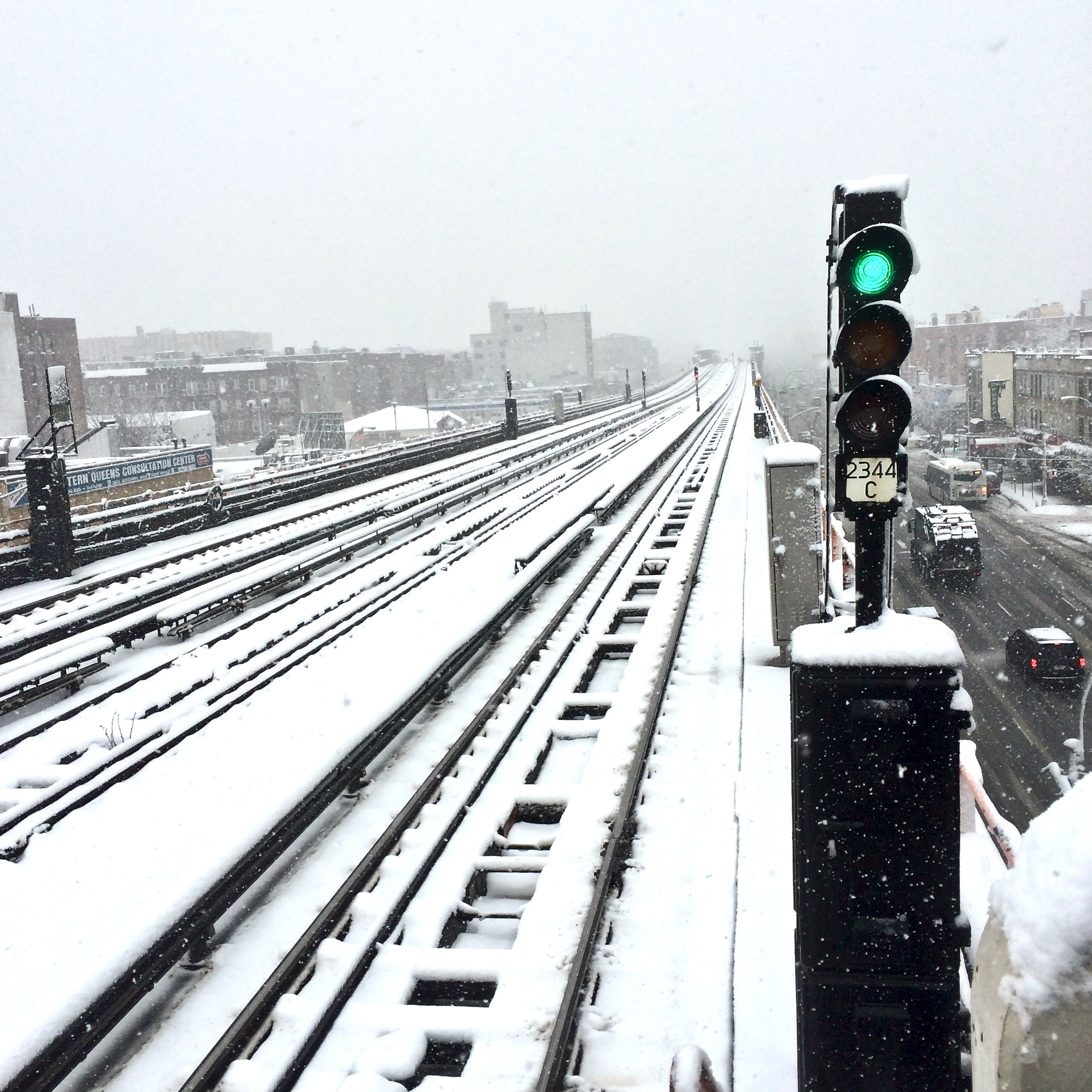
View facing west from 46th Street–Bliss Street station in Sunnyside on February 3, 2014. The Manhattan skyline, ordinarily visible, is obscured by whiteout conditions.

From January 29 to February 3, a storm system affected a large area from the West Coast to the Northeast. The initial storm dropped heavy snow in the western states (mostly in the mountains), before affecting the Plains, Midwest, and the Great Lakes with snow, sleet, and freezing rain on February 1. Accumulations were generally light to moderate, with localized amounts over 6 inches (15 cm). On February 2–3, a secondary system developed along the frontal boundary leftover by the first system in the Southern Plains, and moved along the Ohio Valley into the Northeast. Snowfall amounts were generally 3-6 inches (8-15 cm), but reached 8 inches (20 cm) in New York City and 9.3 inches (24 cm) in Allentown, Pennsylvania.

From February 4 to 7, a much larger and more potent storm emerged from the West and tracked from the Midwest into the Northeast, with heavy wintry precipitation along the way. A large swath of over 6 inches (15 cm) of snow occurred from the Central Plains into the Interior Northeast, with significant freezing rain just to the south. Snow accumulations reached 8.5 inches (22 cm) in Indianapolis, Indiana, 9 inches (23 cm) in Toronto, 9.2 inches (23 cm) in Kansas City, Missouri, 10.7 inches (27 cm) in Columbus, Ohio, and 13.2 inches (33 cm) in Topeka, Kansas. New York City saw 4 inches (10 cm) of snow followed by 0.25" (7 mm) of ice. Parts of Interstate 55 through Arkansas was rendered impassable by freezing rain.

=== Mid-February nor'easter ===
- Category 4 "Crippling" (RSI/NOAA: 14.66)
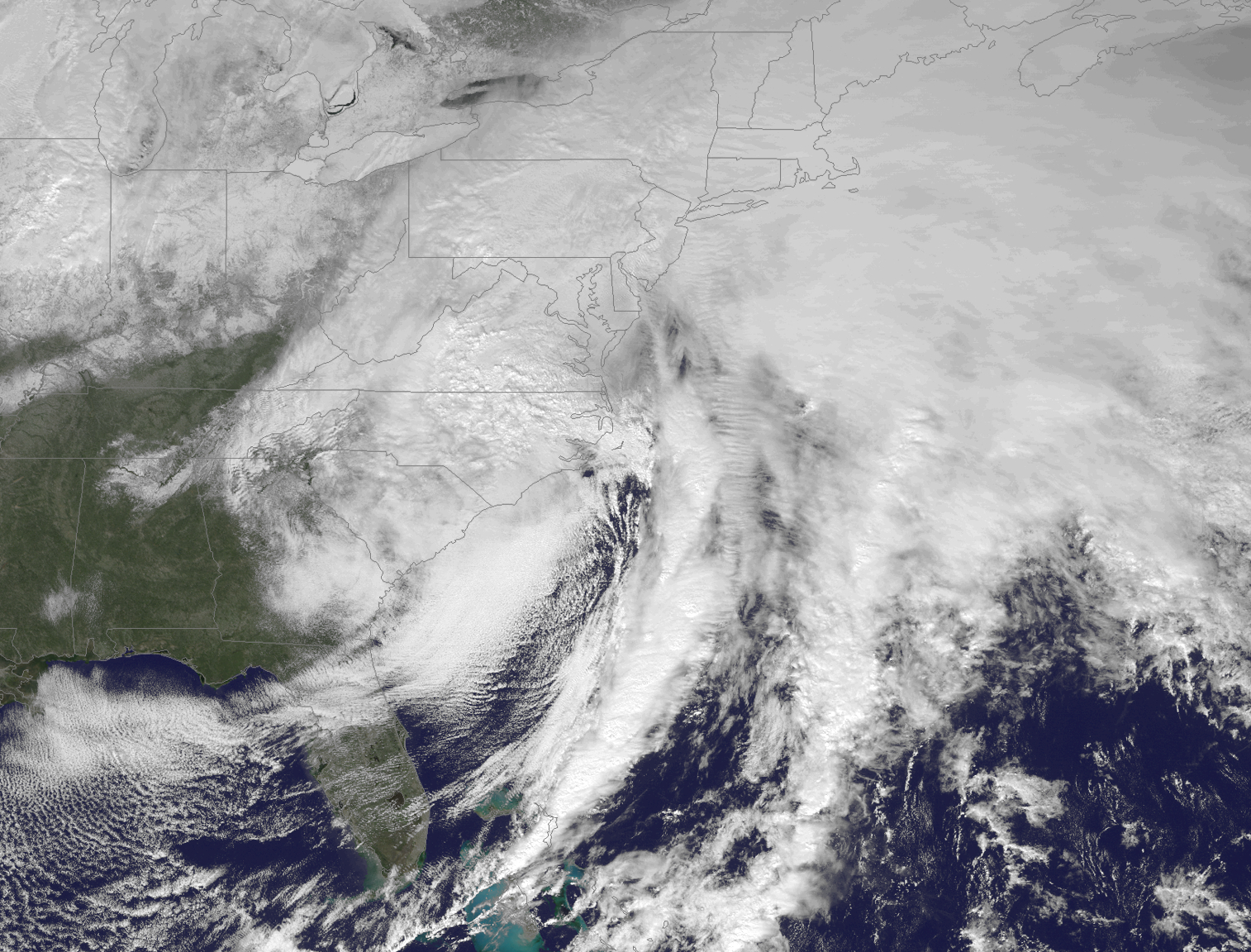
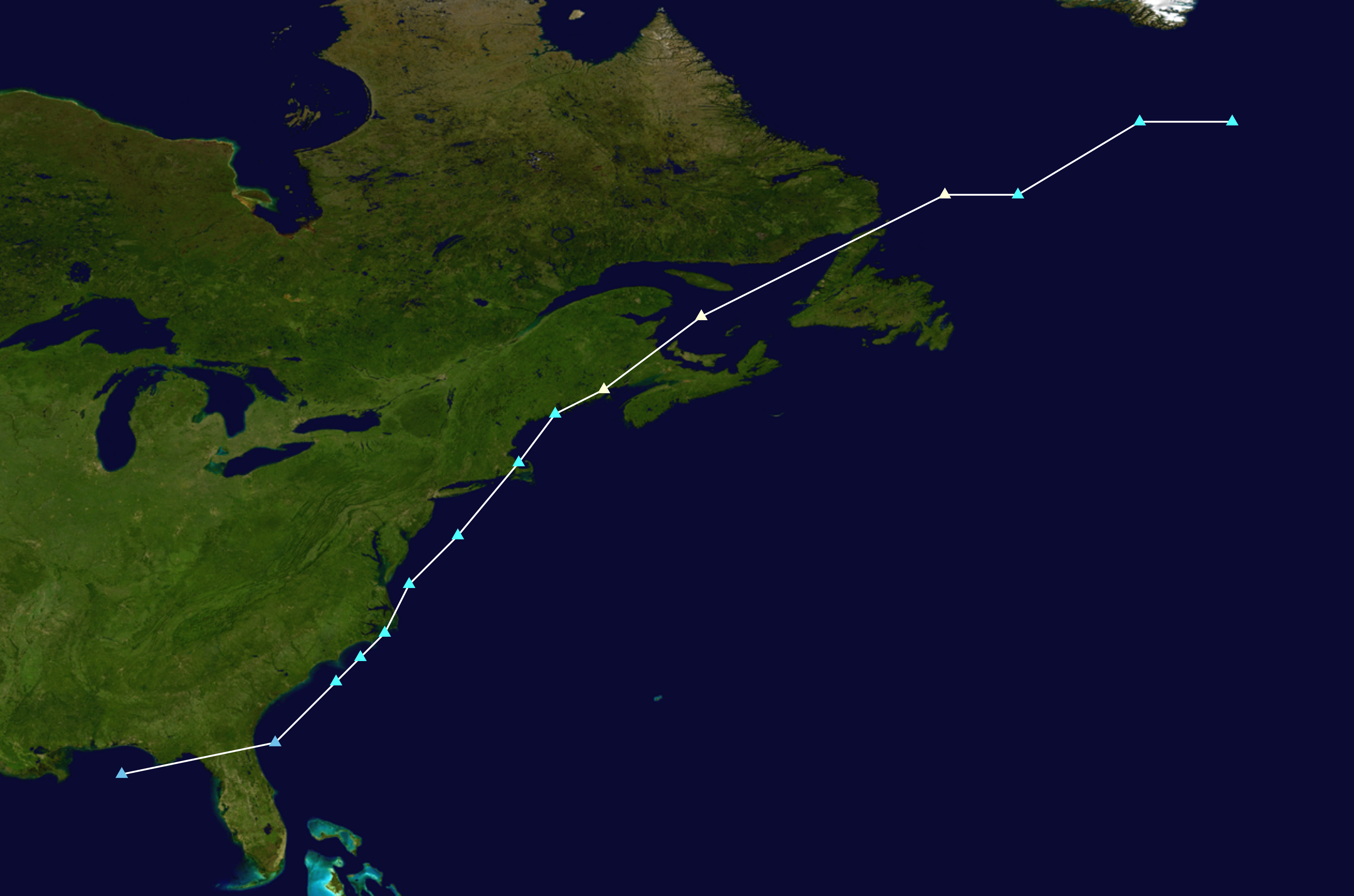
- Duration: February 11 – February 14, 2014
- Lowest pressure: 968 mb (28.59 inHg)
- Maximum snow: 27.5 in (70 cm)
- Fatalities: 22 fatalities
- Damage: $750 million (2014 USD)

A major nor'easter produced a damaging snow and ice storm that affected the Southern United States and East Coast of the United States in mid-February, bringing with it up to a foot of snow and crippling ice across parts of the South. Areas from eastern Alabama, including Atlanta in Georgia to the Southeast coast and South Carolina experienced icy precipitation. A new area of low pressure developed off the South Carolina coast late on February 12, and began to intensify as it tracked to the north before impacting the Northeast. Continued rapid deepening occurred into the night into early on February 14 as another round of snow moved into the Northeast on the back-end of the nor'easter, increasing the pressure gradient and causing gusty winds along the coast. The system peaked with a pressure of 968 mb (28.6 inHg) later that morning as it moved into Canada, as the WPC ceased monitoring at the same time as the overall event concluded across the Northeast U.S. The storm eventually passed into Canada on February 14 before moving out to sea, dissipating by February 24, ten days later. Snow totals in the heaviest affected regions ranged anywhere from 6–24 inches (15–61 cm) as a result.

Impacts from the storm were widespread and damaging. Thousands if not hundreds of thousands of people were left in the dark for days, possibly even up to 2 weeks without power. Delta Air Lines canceled over 2,000 flights, and it was reported by 8:00 p.m. Thursday, February 13, that as many as 6,500 flights originating in or destined for the United States had been canceled. On that day 70 percent of flights were cancelled at airports in Baltimore, Philadelphia, Washington, D.C., and Charlotte. Approximately 1.2 million homes and businesses lost power as the storm moved from the South through the Northeast. By the evening of Thursday, February 13, about 550,000 customers remained in the dark, mostly in South Carolina and Georgia.

=== Late February storm complex ===
On February 19, an area of low pressure moved out the High Plains into the Midwest. Originally devoid of moisture, it began to track to the north. Drawing moisture from the Gulf of Mexico, it began to intensify. This was thrown back into cold air that was situated over parts of the Midwest at the time. As a result, an intense swath of snow developed from northern parts of Nebraska to western Iowa near Omaha early on February 20. As the storm system continued to move northwards, the winds began to pick up, setting the stage for blizzard conditions. Thundersnow was also observed in parts of the affected areas, due to the instability in the atmosphere. Wind gusts of up to 60 mph (97 km/h) and 12–24 inches (30–61 cm) of snow were reported from this system.

=== Late February–early March winter storm ===
- Category 1 "Notable" (RSI/NOAA: 1.466)
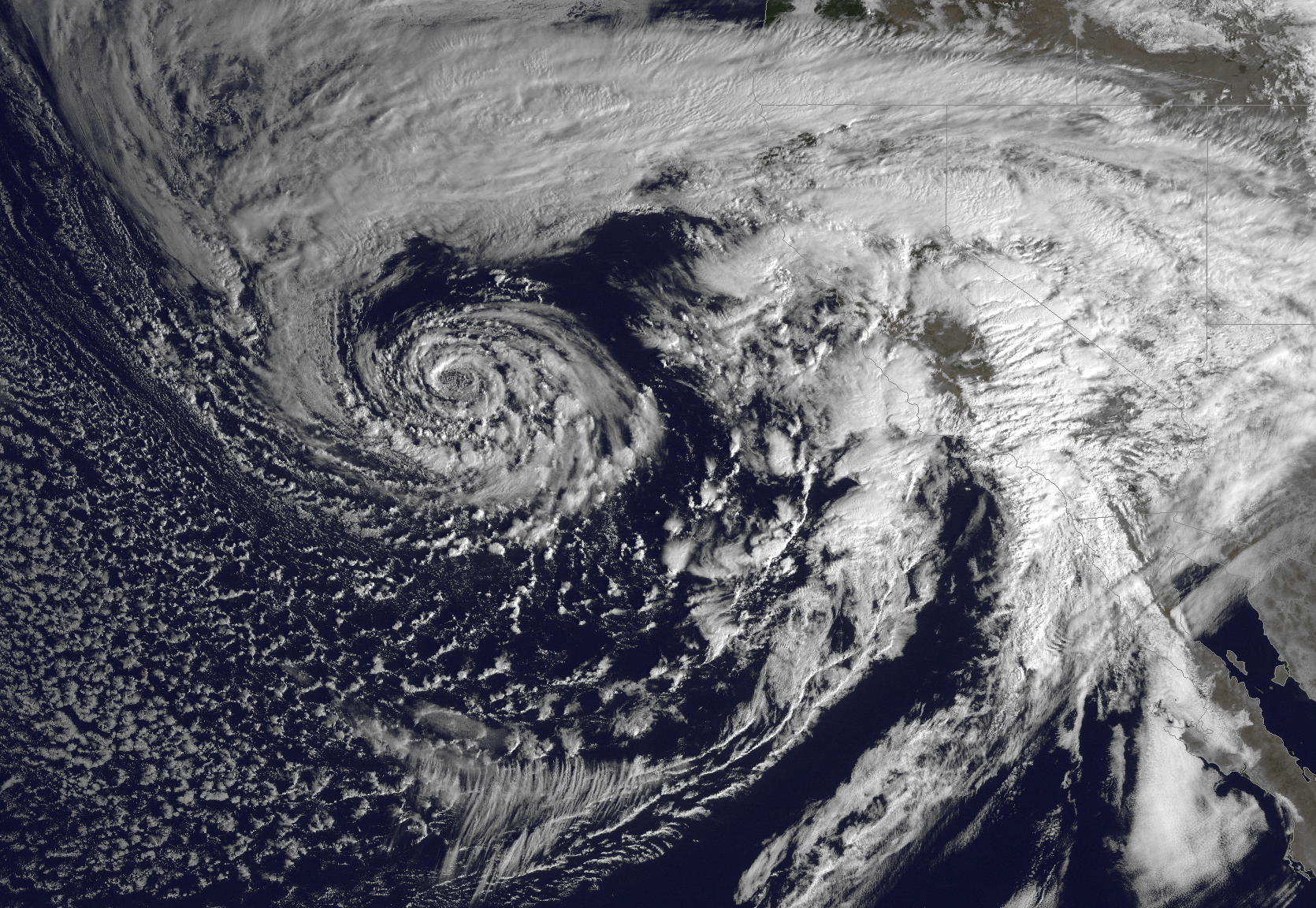
- Duration: February 27 – March 4, 2014
- Lowest pressure: 968 mb (28.59 inHg)
- Maximum snow: 40 in (100 cm)
- Fatalities: 16 fatalities

On February 28, an extratropical cyclone moved near California, intensifying as it did so. Showers and thunderstorms began spreading into California early on March 1 which is the atmospheric river with heavy snowfall in the mountains, torrential rainfall, triggering numerous flash floods, and even spawning two EF0 tornadoes in Arizona and California The storm weakened somewhat as it began to pass through the southwestern United States, but maintained its structure as it began to move towards the central part of the country.

At the same time, an Alberta clipper was moving through the Upper Midwest, dropping relatively light to moderate snow through the areas. The energy between the clipper system and the remains of the extratropical cyclone combined to produce energy for a long tracked winter storm. Late on March 2, snow and ice began to develop along a weak area of low pressure near Texas and Oklahoma. Numerous locations reported thunderstorms with sleet and freezing rain due to the intense upper-air dynamics and Arctic air at the surface. A small squall line began to set up ahead of the cold front. Snow and ice began to reach into the Mid-Atlantic near midnight, which eventually started to sag southwards, keeping most of the heaviest snow accumulations to the south of the Northeast. The system then moved off by evening on March 3. Snowfall accumulations ranged from 3–7 inches (7.6–17.8 cm) from the winter storm. At least 16 fatalities were reported.

=== March ice storm ===
A gulf low moved inland over the peninsula of Florida on March 5, bringing abundant moisture into the Southeast. An area of high pressure settled in over the Northeast, which pushed cold air down into the Southeast. This set the stage for an ice storm in those areas. On March 6, the northern edge of the system moved into the cold air, and ice began to break out in northern parts of the Carolinas. Ice accumulations totaled up to 1 inch (25 mm) in some of the hardest hit areas, which some did not have power for several days. On the colder side of the ice storm, snow accumulations ranged up to 16 inches (41 cm) in the higher elevations. The system then turned to the east and moved offshore near the North Carolina–South Carolina border late on March 7 and accelerated into the northern Atlantic Ocean.

=== Late March bomb cyclone ===
- Category 0 "Nuisance" (RSI/NOAA: N/A)
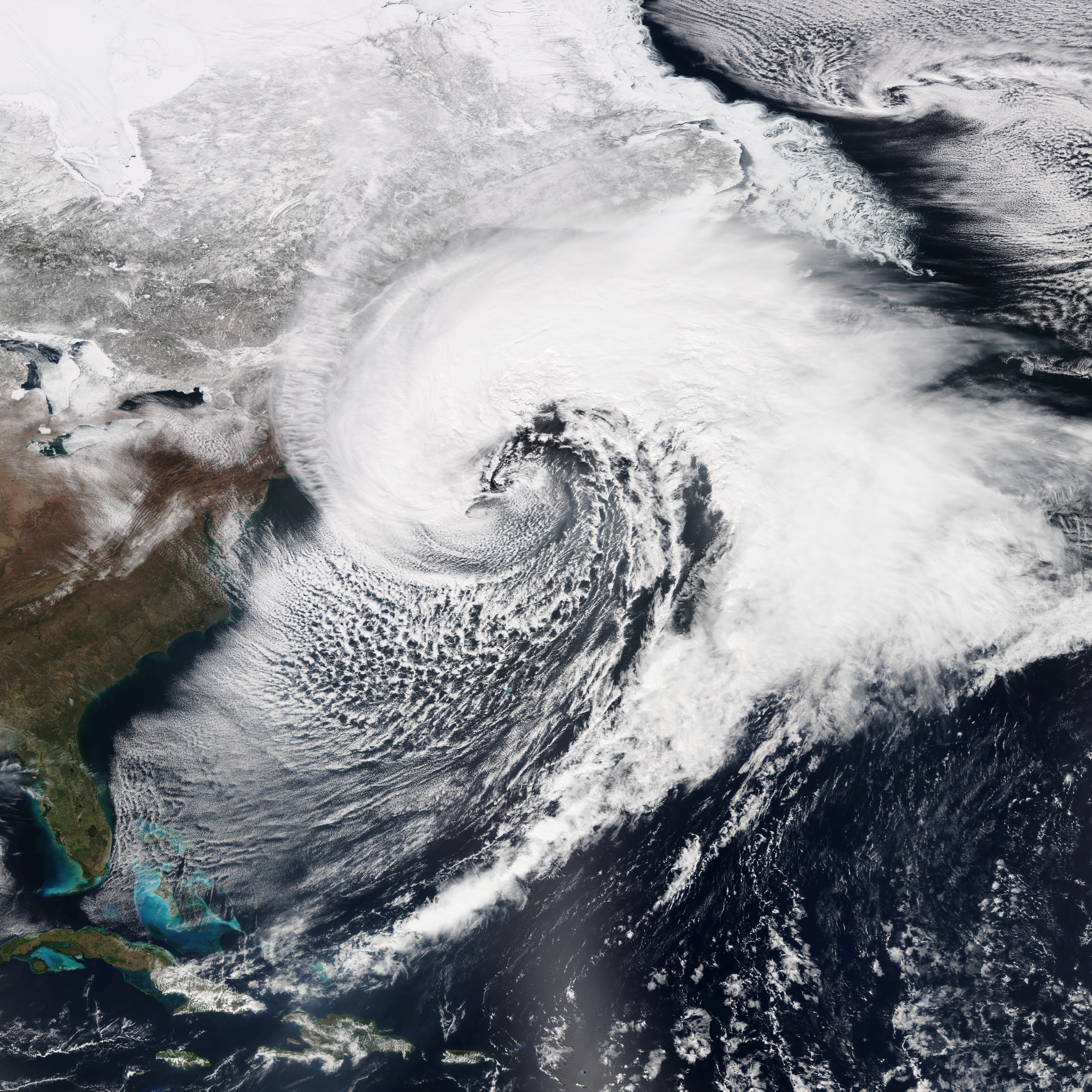
- Duration: March 24 – March 28, 2014
- Lowest pressure: 954 mb (28.17 inHg)
- Maximum snow: 12.2 in (31 cm)

Late on March 25, a winter storm emerged off the coast of the Southeastern United States and began to undergo explosive intensification, becoming a meteorological bomb by March 26. Powered by moisture coming from the Gulf of Mexico, the storm quickly became an unusually powerful nor'easter four times the size of Hurricane Sandy, and reached a maximum low pressure of 954 mbar (28.2 inHg; 95.4 kPa). The system produced powerful sustained winds up to 89 mph (143 km/h), and wind gusts up to 119 mph (192 km/h), with unofficial amounts reaching 129 mph (208 km/h). After making landfall on Nova Scotia, the system weakened to a 960 mbar (28 inHg; 96 kPa) nor'easter on March 27, before weakening further to a 975 mbar (28.8 inHg; 97.5 kPa) storm on March 28. On March 29, the system deteriorated into a weak winter storm over Greenland, where it would remain for the next few days while slowly dissipating.

=== Early May storm complex ===
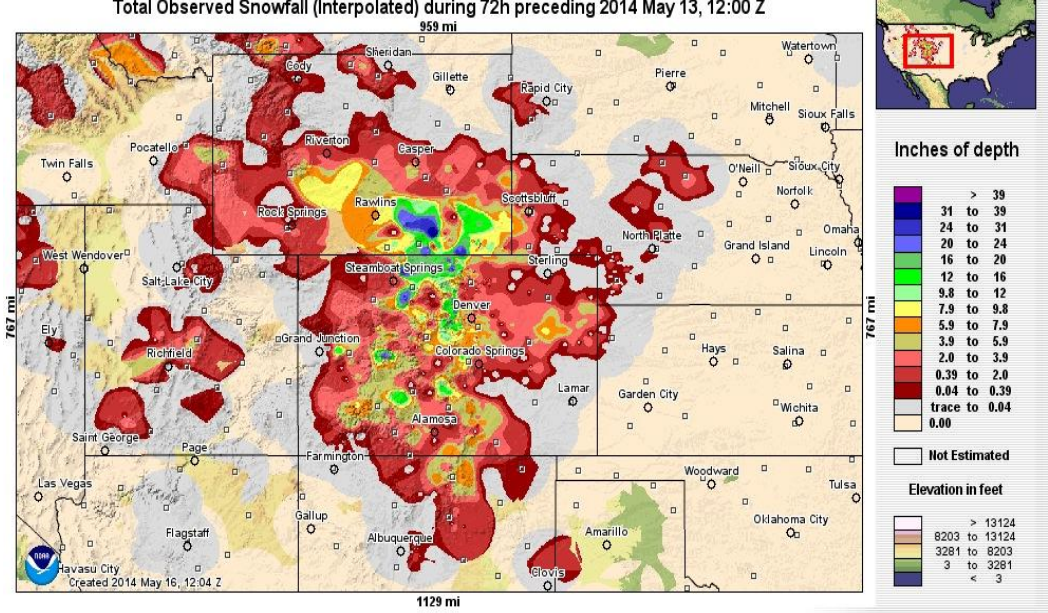
NOAA NOHRSC map of the Rocky Mountains with measured snowfall

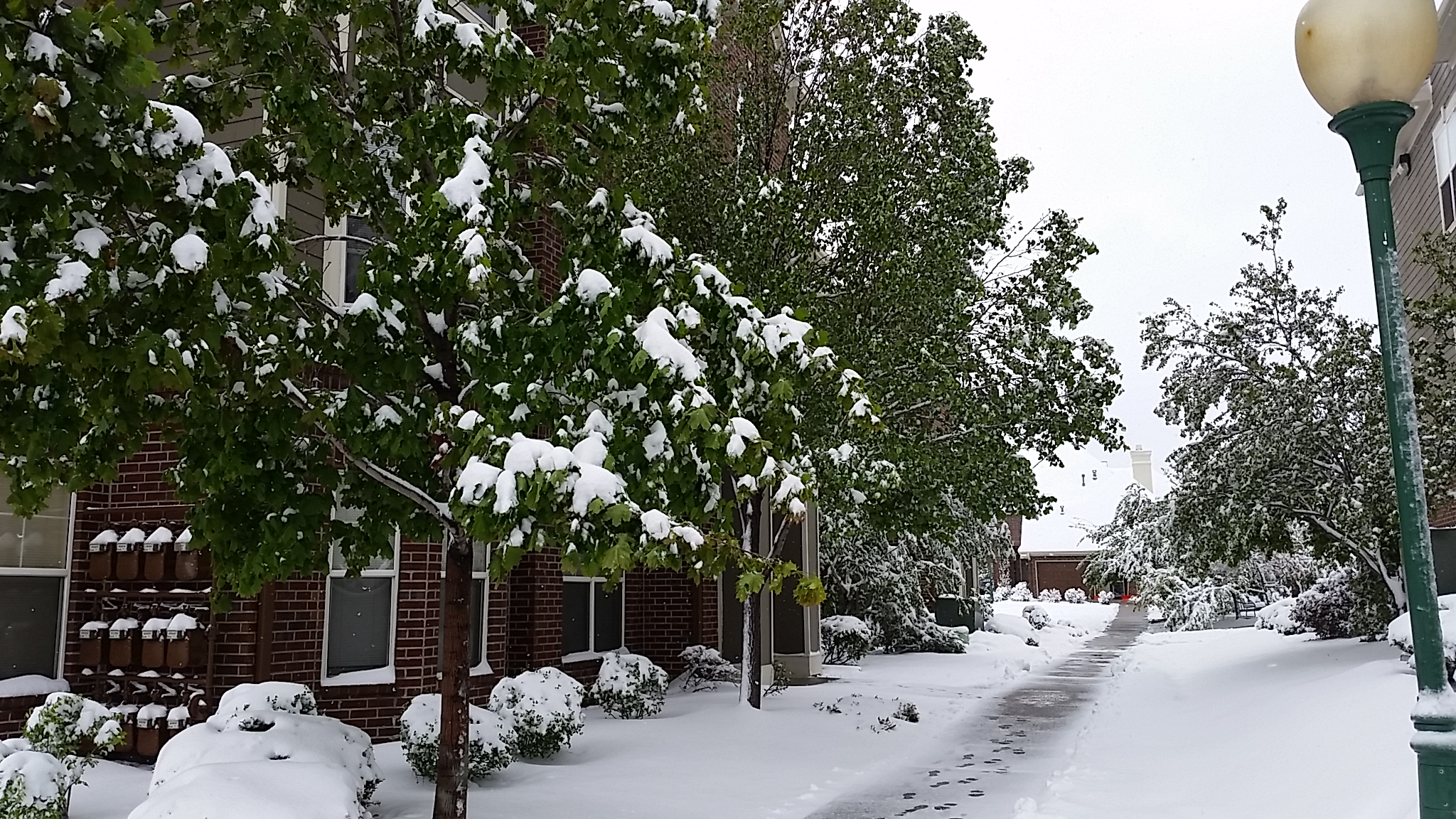
The winter storm bringing in snow to Colorado

From May 10 to 14, a rare late-season winter storm occurred over the central Rocky Mountains and High Plains. Areas in western Nebraska, Wyoming, Colorado and Utah were impacted by the snow storm. Over 1 ft (0.30 m) of snowfall across multiple locations. The highest measured was at Divide Peak, at the Sierra Madre mountain range in southern Wyoming, which saw 43 in (1.1 m) of snow. Other places with heavy measurements were near Pinecliffe, Colorado, a measurement of 30.1 in (0.76 m) of snow occurred. In Leadville, Colorado and Arlington, Wyoming; 22 in (0.56 m) of snow was recorded. Heavy wet snow damaged trees in Cedar City, Utah. According to Xcel Energy, up to 17.000 customers lost power during the morning hours of May 12. Denver International Airport was among the many that suffered from the power outages, but the impact was kept at minimum due to a backup generator. Travel and transportation across the Rockies were severely hampered and became dangerous throughout the duration of the storm. Flights at airports in the impacted regions saw delays or cancellations. One death occurred by winter storm on US 285, near Denver, Colorado. In Wyoming, I-80 was issued to be closed off. This prompt caused thousands of motorists to be stranded, and rest stops along the interstate were overcrowded.

== Records ==
=== Eastern United States ===
The NOAA's National Climatic Data Center found that since modern records began in 1895, the period from December 2013 through February 2014 was the 34th-coldest such period for the contiguous 48 states as a whole. They also found 91% of the Great Lakes were iced over, the second highest percentage on record. Ice on the Great Lakes did not fully melt until early June. That was the latest date of ice on the Great Lakes ever. The average temperature for the contiguous U.S. during the winter season was 31.3 °F (−0.4 °C), one degree below the 20th-century average, and the number of daily record-low temperatures outnumbered the number of record-high temperatures nationally in early 2014. In addition, while December through February was the ninth driest on record for the contiguous 48 states dating to 1895, chiefly due to extremely dry conditions in the West and Southwest, yet Winter snow cover areal extent was the 10th-largest on record for same 48 states, dating to 1966. New York City, Philadelphia, and Chicago all had one of their ten snowiest winters, while Detroit had its snowiest winter on record.

The first week of March 2014 also saw remarkably low temperatures in many places, with 18 states setting all-time records for cold. Among them was Flint, Michigan, which reached −16 °F (−27 °C) March 3, and Rockford, Illinois at −11 °F (−24 °C).

=== Western United States ===
In contrast, California had its warmest winter on record, being 4.4 °F (2.4 °C) above average, while the first two months of 2014 were the warmest on record in Fresno, Los Angeles, San Francisco, Las Vegas, Nevada, Phoenix and Tucson, Arizona.

=== Canada ===
As of February 27, Winnipeg was experiencing the second-coldest winter in 75 years, the coldest in 35 years and with snowfall total being 50 per cent more than normal. Saskatoon was experiencing the coldest winter in 18 years; Windsor, Ontario, the coldest winter in 35 years and snowiest winter on record; Toronto, the coldest winter in 20 years; St. John's, Newfoundland and Labrador, the coldest winter in 20 years, the snowiest winter in seven years and a record number of stormy days. Vancouver, which is known for its milder weather, was realizing one of its coldest and snowiest Februarys in 25 years. On February 28, Hamilton, Ontario set a record low of −22 °C (−8 °F).

In 2014 the U.S. winter period December – February had experienced its coldest in 25 years, while Canada had its warmest winter on record.

== Season effects ==
2013–14 North American winter season statistics
Event name	Dates active	RSI category	RSI value	Highest gust mph (km/h)	Minimum pressure (mbar)	Maximum snow in (cm)	Maximum ice in (mm)	Areas affected	Damage (2014 USD)	Deaths
Season aggregates
0 RSI storms	TBD – TBD				TBD	0	0		≥ $0	0

== See also ==
- Weather of 2010
- January–March 2014 North American cold wave
- November 2014 North American cold wave
- Cold wave
- Polar vortex
- Winter storm

Preceded by 2012–13	North American winters 2013–14	Succeeded by 2014–15
