= January 2014 Gulf Coast winter storm =

Winter storm in United States and Mexico

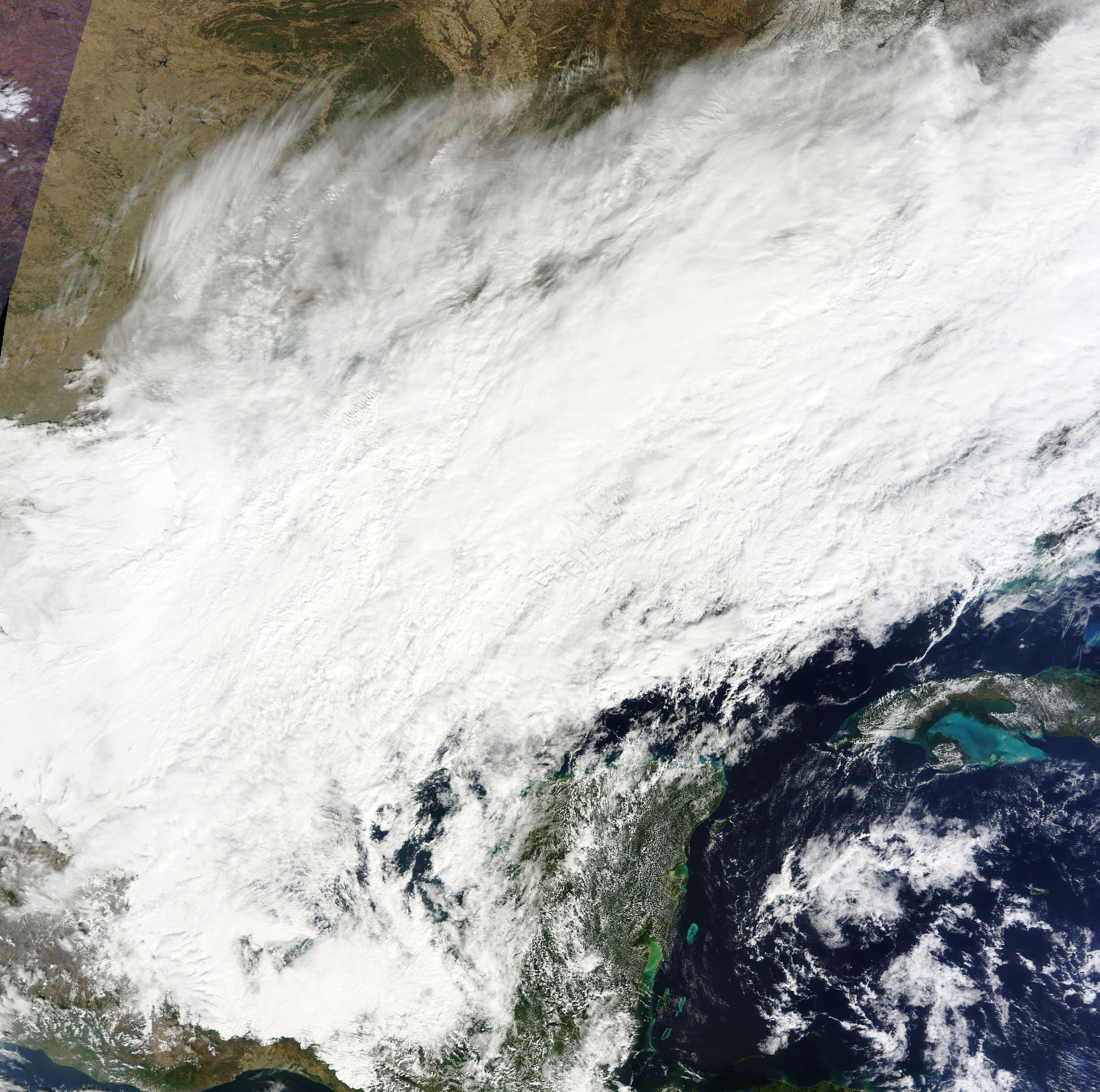
- The winter storm stalled over the Gulf Coast on January 29, 2014.

Meteorological history
- Formed: January 27, 2014
- Dissipated: January 31, 2014

Category 1 "Notable" winter storm
- Regional snowfall index: 1.39 (NOAA)
- Lowest pressure: 1008 mbar (hPa); 29.77 inHg
- Max. snowfall: 10 inches (25 cm) in several places in Virginia

Overall effects
- Casualties: 13 killed, 180 injured
- Areas affected: Southern United States, Eastern United States, Mexico
- Part of the 2013–14 North American winter

The January 2014 Gulf Coast winter storm was a somewhat rare winter storm that impacted the eastern and southeastern United States, as well as Mexico, most notably the Gulf Coast region, which rarely receives frozen precipitation, in late January 2014. The storm came during a period of very cold temperatures across much of the United States, bringing frigid temperatures as far south as the Gulf Coast. The Weather Channel unofficially named it Winter Storm Leon.

The winter storm caused major impacts and severe travel issues in the states of Alabama, Georgia and Mississippi as many people were caught outside unexpectedly in the hazardous conditions, which included snow, freezing rain and sleet. Many travelers were stuck on highways for hours, some even requiring medical assistance due to being stuck. 180 people were injured by the storm and at least two were confirmed to have died in the winter storm. The storm is remembered for the impact it had in Atlanta, Georgia, where the brunt of the damage occurred, and it is referred to as "Snowmageddon".

== Meteorological synopsis ==
As with most major winter storms in the American South, a low-pressure system formed near the western Gulf of Mexico, in this case, over Mexico on January 27, and eventually moved eastward. The breakdown of the normal polar vortex around the North Pole allowed an outbreak of frigid Arctic air to penetrate well into the South. The cold wave traveled much further south than normal, such that when the precipitation arrived from the Gulf Coast winter storm, freezing temperatures were occurring all of the way down to the coast.

Despite the unusually far southward incursion of cold air, the storm took a somewhat more northward track than initially expected, much to the relief of some areas that were spared, and much to the surprise of others further north that had not paid attention to later changes in weather forecasts and corresponding winter storm warnings. On January 31, the weakened winter storm was absorbed into the circulation of another more powerful extratropical cyclone over the North Atlantic, while situated off the coast of South Carolina.

== Preparations and impact ==
=== Gulf Coast ===
Freezing rain and sleet were recorded in coastal cities including Houston in southeast Texas, New Orleans in southeast Louisiana, Mobile in southwest Alabama, and Pensacola and Tallahassee in the Florida panhandle. Much of Interstate 10 was closed to east and west traffic, as well as others to and from inland areas. Bridges to barrier islands were also closed due to ice, and the almost total lack of deicing equipment and chemicals both for the Florida DOT and for local governments in all affected states, which had to rely entirely on sand spreaders retrofitted to dump trucks. Other states were able to move resources down from further up-state, however freeways and other state routes are generally the only roads which are treated by state governments.

On the Atlantic coast, Jacksonville was completely spared, and in coastal Georgia the ice storm warning was lowered, leaving Savannah with only some sleet. Further north, coastal South Carolina got some of the freezing rain, closing bridges around Charleston. The Outer Banks of North Carolina received significant snows, as did the Tidewater region of southeastern Virginia.

=== Southeast ===
Further north, significant snows fell. Earlier forecasts had the heaviest accumulations going through southern Alabama and middle Georgia, causing the Alabama DOT to send most of its snow removal to points around Montgomery and southward, and the Georgia DOT to bring its own resources down from north Georgia, whose mountain counties are the most likely of any in the deep South to get winter weather.

==== Georgia ====
The National Weather Service (NWS) had forecast the storm well in advance, as did meteorologists for local media and for national TV networks. For north and central Georgia, NWSFO Peachtree City first issued a winter storm watch well in advance of the storm, which included most of metro Atlanta except for the northernmost counties. On January 27, warnings were issued for the south metro area, while the central region (from east to west) was placed under a winter weather advisory. Some took this to be a "lowering" from a storm watch, although this was not the case, since there is no separate precursor to an advisory (which indicates less than 2 inches (5 cm) in the case of snow), other than the same watch used as a precursor to a potential warning. A source of some of the confusion was a tweet issued by the NWSFO in Peachtree City at 3:08 pm and repeated on the local news that read: "Winter precip will make travel risky across GA midday Tues into Weds. Not a bad idea to stay off the roads if you're able!". Many believed that the storm would not occur until midday and planned accordingly.

At 3:38 AM, on January 28, the winter storm warning was expanded northward, to include all except the northern exurbs. Despite this coming more than two hours before school systems' 6 am deadline to call off classes and notify local media, and the fact that the previous advisory predicted plenty enough snow to make driving dangerous, and that prior releases noted the northward trend may require expansion of the warning, many superintendents, including those of Douglas County Schools, Cobb County Schools, Marietta City Schools, Fulton County Schools, DeKalb County Schools, Decatur City Schools, Cherokee County Schools, Paulding County School District and Gwinnett County Schools, failed to cancel school until it was too late. Some superintendents apologized, including those for Douglas and Atlanta, while Cobb superintendent Hinojosa refused to acknowledge his failure, and even went so far as to claim that he "wouldn't have done anything different", despite students being stuck on school buses for hours, and some having to spend the night in schools.

Even more students were stuck in Cherokee, a northern exurban county to which the warning was not extended until later in the morning, but still well before students were actually released. Gwinnett schools failed to release students early at all, and was spared only by the fact that the snow and dropping temperatures arrived slightly later on the northeast side of the metro. DeKalb schools staged buses outside schools, and thus had very few students stuck. South-metro counties correctly called off classes before they began, avoiding issues entirely.

Buses became stuck not only due to slick roads, but even more so because traffic in metro Atlanta (except the east and southeast) quickly ground to a halt between noon and 1pm, as shown on TV by traffic-speed maps from GDOT's Georgia Navigator system. Complete gridlock ensued, preventing the area's few snowplows and other road-treatment vehicles from getting anywhere. Tractor-trailer trucks became stuck on the Perimeter (Interstate 285), essentially closing the bypass route around the city. Other trucks, normally banned from inside the Perimeter except for local deliveries and pickups, then went through town and became stuck along with other traffic. At least three babies were born on the roads, including one delivered on I-285 by a Sandy Springs police officer who was having his own birthday that day, and whose daughter was born when the Great Blizzard of 1993 hit Atlanta. Another was born with nobody other than the mother present.

Along with the Georgia State Patrol (GSP) and Highway Emergency Response Operator (HERO) units, the Georgia National Guard, and the Georgia State Defense Force (GSDF) were called out to deliver supplies and rescue stranded motorists. (One unit included Clark Howard, a GSDF Soldier who is well known as a consumer reporter for WSB-TV 2 and nationally for a daily radio show based at WSB AM 750.) Cars blocking lanes of travel were towed, with most jurisdictions paying for towing to the road shoulder, or to a location where cars could be retrieved later (for example, the state towed cars from the west side of I-285 and I-20 to the West Lake MARTA station parking lot). Cobb was the only county that was only offering reduced prices rather than free towing, despite being one of the counties that caused the problem by failing to pre-treat roads.

Only MARTA rail continued to run, while MARTA buses and other bus systems had to halt service.

As a result of the snowy and icy conditions around Atlanta, the National Basketball Association decided to postpone a game between the Detroit Pistons and Atlanta Hawks.

==== Alabama ====
Severe travel disruptions also resulted in Birmingham, and many schools in northern Alabama also encountered similar issues as in Georgia. Further east, in the Carolinas, schools closed for the following day in Charlotte and Columbia. A state of emergency was declared by governors in Louisiana, Mississippi, Alabama, Georgia, South Carolina, and North Carolina. At one point, a continuous string of winter storm warnings was draped across at least eight states from Texas to the Carolinas, a distance of over 1,000 miles (1,600 km).

The storm also forced several airports to cancel 3,000 U.S. flights, the hardest hit being Hartsfield–Jackson Atlanta International Airport, Chicago O'Hare and Houston Intercontinental.

== Aftermath ==
The governor of Georgia, Nathan Deal, and the mayor of Atlanta, Kasim Reed, both faced heavy local and national media criticism over their handling of the event, particularly after they and other local officials tried to wrongly blame official NWS forecasts. However, Atlanta city limits only encompass about 10% of the nearly five million people in metro Atlanta (which is in turn about half of all Georgians). The other 90% live in other cities or in unincorporated areas of counties. With more than a dozen counties, each with multiple cities, very little intergovernmental cooperation occurs due to local politics, and there is no metropolitan government except for a weak planning agency. Further complications are because commuting frequently occurs between suburbs rather than to the city and back, so that even if Atlanta were to act on its own, it would have little effect on the rest of the region.

Additionally, Georgia public schools are organized under the Georgia Department of Education, thus school districts are not under local government control. State freeways are also outside the jurisdiction of local authorities, and the state did not even permit snow removal or other treatment of surface state routes until January 2011, when Atlanta was forced to wait two days to treat the heavy snow and freezing rain that had frozen solid together on the city's main street, Peachtree Street, since it is also a state route (9 and 141). Therefore, the only thing that the mayor has legal or practical authority to do is to make sure that city streets are treated out to the city limits, and to encourage those businesses in the extended central business district to either let employees go earlier in a staggered and orderly fashion, or to keep them at home to begin with.

To avoid future snows from becoming disasters, Mayor Reed has decided to hire an emergency manager for the city, in hopes of coordinating a more regional response, although it is unclear if suburban counties with a long-time antipathy toward the city will accept such an outreach. Governor Deal is convening a Severe Weather Warning Task Force that includes local and state officials, as well as meteorologists from the National Weather Service, the locally headquartered Weather Channel, and from local TV stations, including Ken Cook with 40 years at WAGA-TV 5, and Chesley McNeil at WXIA-TV 11 since 2009, after coming from snowy Buffalo, New York.

=== Snowfall totals ===
Below is a list of selected snowfall totals from the storm.

Amount	City/location	State
10.0 inches (25 cm)	Jolliff	VA
10.0 inches (25 cm)	Park Manor	VA
10.0 inches (25 cm)	Stone Bridge	VA
10.0 inches (25 cm)	Willoughby Spit	VA
9.0 inches (23 cm)	Gliden	NC
7.3 inches (19 cm)	Pleasantville	NJ
6.7 inches (17 cm)	Ridge	MD
5.5 inches (14 cm)	East Sandwich	MA
5.4 inches (14 cm)	Ellendale	DE
5.4 inches (14 cm)	Harrington	DE
4.0 inches (10 cm)	Bennettsville	SC
4.0 inches (10 cm)	White	GA
4.0 inches (10 cm)	Jena	LA
4.0 inches (10 cm)	Southampton	NY
3.0 inches (7.6 cm)	Deatsville	AL
3.0 inches (7.6 cm)	Lomax	AL
3.0 inches (7.6 cm)	Marbury	AL
3.0 inches (7.6 cm)	Vida Junction	AL
3.0 inches (7.6 cm)	Wedowee	AL
3.0 inches (7.6 cm)	Cato	MS
3.0 inches (7.6 cm)	Enterprise	MS
3.0 inches (7.6 cm)	Increase	MS
3.0 inches (7.6 cm)	Magee	MS
3.0 inches (7.6 cm)	Wesson	MS
3.0 inches (7.6 cm)	Zero	MS
2.0 inches (5.1 cm)	Maryville	TN

== See also ==
- Winter storm naming in the United States
- February 2014 nor'easter
- 2025 Gulf Coast blizzard
