= Aleutian Low =

Semi-permanent low-pressure system located near the Aleutian Islands

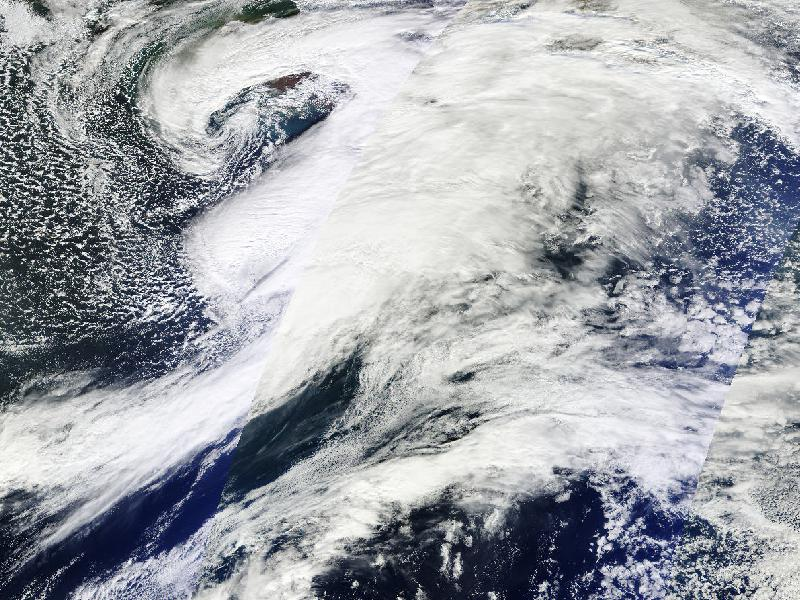
A large Aleutian Low in the Gulf of Alaska on October 24, 2011.

The Aleutian Low is a semi-permanent low-pressure system located near the Aleutian Islands in the Bering Sea during the Northern Hemisphere winter, driven by warm sea water compared to cooler land. It is a climatic feature centered near the Aleutian Islands measured based on mean sea-level pressure. It is one of the largest atmospheric circulation patterns in the Northern Hemisphere and represents one of the "main centers of action in atmospheric circulation."

== Classification ==
The Aleutian Low heavily influences the path and strength of cyclones. Extratropical cyclones which form in the sub-polar latitudes in the North Pacific typically slow down and reach maximum intensity in the area of the Aleutian Low.

Tropical cyclones that form in the tropical and equatorial regions of the Pacific can veer northward and get caught in the Aleutian Low. This is usually seen in the later summer months. Both the November 2011 Bering Sea cyclone and the November 2014 Bering Sea cyclone were extratropical cyclones that had dissipated and restrengthened when the systems entered the Aleutian Low region. The storms are remembered and marked as two of the strongest storms to impact the Bering Sea and Aleutian Islands with pressure dropping below 950 mb in each system.

The magnitude of the low pressure creates an extreme atmospheric disturbance, which can cause other significant shifts in weather. Following the November 2014 Bering Sea cyclone, a huge cold wave, November 2014 North American cold wave, hit the US bringing record breaking low temperatures to many states.

== Effects ==
The low serves as an atmospheric driver for low-pressure systems, post-tropical cyclones and their remnants and can generate strong storms that impact Alaska and Canada. Intensity of the low is strongest in the winter and almost completely dissipates in the summer. The circulation pattern is measured based on averages of synoptic features help mark the locations of cyclones and their paths over a given time period. However, there is significant variability in these measurements. The circulation pattern shifts during the Northern Hemisphere summer when the North Pacific High takes over and breaks apart the Aleutian Low. This high-pressure circulation pattern strongly influences tropical cyclone paths. The presence of the Eurasian and North American continents prevent a continuous belt of low pressure from developing in the Northern Hemisphere sub-polar latitudes, which would mirror the circumpolar belt of low pressure and frequent storms in the Southern Ocean.

However, the presence of the continents disrupts this motion, and the subpolar belt of low pressure is well developed only in the North Pacific (the Aleutian Low) and the North Atlantic (the Icelandic Low, which is located between Greenland and Iceland). The strength of the Aleutian Low has been proposed as a driving factor in determining primary production in the water column and, in turn, impacting the catch in the salmon fishery.
