= October 2022 Southern Ocean cyclone =

- The cyclone on 16 October, soon before record peak intensity

Meteorological history
- Formed: 9 October 2022 (ECMWF); 16 October 2022 (Geophysical Research Letters paper)
- Dissipated: 20 October 2022 (ECMWF); 22 October 2022 (Geophysical Research Letters paper)

Extratropical cyclone
- Lowest pressure: ≤900.7 hPa (mbar); ≤26.60 inHg

Overall effects
- Fatalities: None
- Damage: None

The October 2022 Southern Ocean cyclone, also referred to as the Peter I storm or EC2022 was the most intense extratropical cyclone on record. Forming as a weak depression near Tonga late on 9 October, the extratropical cyclone tracked slowly southeastward across the South Pacific, remaining weak. Starting on 14 October, the cyclone began rapid deepening as it moved towards Antarctica. Deepening rates peaked on 16 October, where the pressure fell as rapidly as 19 mbar (0.56 inHg) over a six-hour period. The storm peaked early on 17 October in the Bellingshausen Sea, with a minimum pressure of around 900 mbar (26.58 inHg). The cyclone moved slowly in a loop, rising in pressure over the next few days before dissipating on 20 October.

The cyclone's pressure has been estimated by the European Centre for Medium-Range Weather Forecasts (ECMWF) as 900.7 mbar (26.60 inHg) at 06:00 UTC on 17 October. An analysis paper published in Geophysical Research Letters in July 2023 got a minimum pressure of 899.91 mbar (26.574 inHg) at 03:00 UTC the same day. These pressures would make the extratropical cyclone the most intense since at least the start of the satellite era; for comparison, the most intense extratropical cyclone known over the North Atlantic was the Braer Storm in 1993, with a pressure of 914 mbar (27.0 inHg).

== Background ==
The Southern Ocean is defined as the body of water that surrounds Antarctica, generally below 60° degrees south. The status of the Southern Ocean is disputed, with it being an official ocean on the 2002 draft of Limits of Oceans and Seas by the International Hydrographic Organization. However, the draft has not been published due to several naming disputes of different bodies of water, primarily the Sea of Japan.

Extratropical cyclones in the Southern Ocean have been observed to be stronger than Northern Hemisphere cyclones at the same latitude. Cyclones in the Southern Ocean tend to have the lowest pressures in mid-late September, when Antarctic sea ice is at its maximum. The lower pressures are likely caused by less friction against sea ice rather than ocean waves. As there are limited weather stations in the region, pressures in the region are calculated using results from ECMWF models and ERA5 reanalysis data using 13 different variables including temperature, potential vorticity and 10 meter wind.

== Meteorological history ==
Map plotting the storm's track and intensity, according to the Saffir–Simpson scale Map key Saffir–Simpson scale Tropical depression (≤38 mph, ≤62 km/h) Tropical storm (39–73 mph, 63–118 km/h) Category 1 (74–95 mph, 119–153 km/h) Category 2 (96–110 mph, 154–177 km/h) Category 3 (111–129 mph, 178–208 km/h) Category 4 (130–156 mph, 209–251 km/h) Category 5 (≥157 mph, ≥252 km/h) Unknown Storm type Tropical cyclone Subtropical cyclone Extratropical cyclone, remnant low, tropical disturbance, or monsoon depression

The cyclone's origins can be traced back to 9 October, when a weak extratropical cyclone formed near Tonga. The cyclone spent around a day moving slowly near the island before moving southeastward on 11 October. The cyclone started to deepen on 13 October and rapidly move across the Southeast Pacific. During this time, the isobars along the southeastern side of the cyclone elongated with additional development taking place on the eastern side. This caused an accelerated movement of the cyclone between 06:00 UTC and 12:00 UTC on 13 October. At this time, the associated warm front with this extratropical cyclone started to deepen and turn poleward. Explosive cyclogenesis occurred on the 16th, with the storm's central pressure falling as rapidly as 19 mbar (0.56 inHg) over a six-hour period. A paper in Geophysical Research Letters first identified the cyclone at 03:00 UTC on this date. The cyclone's peak intensity occurred early on 17 October near Peter I Island in the Bellingshausen Sea. The cyclone then executed a clockwise loop in the Bellingshausen Sea for three days while rising in pressure. The ECMWF concluded that the cyclone lost its identity on 20 October while the Geophysical Research Letters paper called a dissipation two days later in the southwestern Atlantic Ocean.

The cyclone lasted roughly for ten days, much longer than typical cyclones in the North Pacific and North Atlantic, although some summer cyclones in the Arctic Ocean have been observed to last as long.

=== Pressure estimates ===
A weather station on Thurston Island recorded an elevated pressure of 897 mbar (26.5 inHg), a sea-level pressure of 923 mbar (27.3 inHg). The Servicio Meteorológico Nacional of Argentina marked the cyclone as having a pressure of 905 mbar (26.7 inHg) on 17 October at 12:00 UTC. The analysis of data from the ERA5 model by the ECMWF estimates that the cyclone's central pressure reached a minimum of 900.7 mbar (26.60 inHg) along the edge of the Bellingshausen Sea near Peter I Island at around 06:00 UTC on 17 October. They note that the storm originating in the tropics might have helped the pressure of the cyclone get so low. A subsequent analysis published in Geophysical Research Letters in July 2023 estimated a minimum central pressure of 899.91 mbar (26.574 inHg) at 03:00 UTC 17 October.

=== Forecasts ===
In the week preceding the event, ECMWF high-resolution forecast models were "remarkably consistent" in the forecast of a very deep low-pressure system in the Bellingshausen Sea. Minimum pressures were generally in the range of 895–910 mbar (26.4–26.9 inHg). Model runs from the Global Forecast System and various ensemble models also had a consensus of a sub 910 mbar (27 inHg) system.

== Records and findings ==
Most intense extratropical cyclones in the Southern Ocean
Rank	Date	Pressure	Location
1	October 2022	899.91 mbar (26.574 inHg)	69°S 98°W
2	September 2018	910.8 mbar (26.90 inHg)	70°S 115°W
3	September 2022	912.11 mbar (26.935 inHg)	71°S 169°W
4	August 1983	913.54 mbar (26.977 inHg)	70°S 151°W
5	March 2002	914.58 mbar (27.008 inHg)	70°S 127°W

At peak, the cyclone reached a minimum pressure of around 900 mbar (26.58 inHg), the lowest pressure of an extratropical cyclone since at least the start of the satellite era in 1980. The deepening rate of the cyclone was greater than 93.4% of other extreme cyclones. Research from the Geophysical Research Letters article shows that amount of extreme extratropical cyclones, especially in the Amundsen and Bellingshausen Seas, has significantly increased between 1980 and 2022. Additionally, the southwest Pacific Ocean and the South Atlantic has seen a decrease in extreme cyclones. At least five cyclones in the Southern Ocean have had pressure equal to or less than 914 mbar (27.0 inHg), the same pressure as the Braer Storm.

== See also ==
- Weather of 2022
- List of weather records
- List of notable non-tropical pressures over the North Atlantic
- Perfect storm
- Typhoon Tip – Strongest tropical cyclone on record with a pressure of 870 mbar (26 inHg)
- 1993 Storm of the Century – Extreme winter storm in March 1993
- January 2013 Northwest Pacific cyclone – 936 mbar (27.6 inHg) extratropical cyclone off the coast of Japan in January 2013
- November 2011 Bering Sea cyclone – Similar strength to the November 2014 cyclone
- November 2014 Bering Sea cyclone – Strongest extratropical cyclone in the Northern Pacific with a pressure of 920 mbar (27 inHg)
- Storm Dennis – 920 mbar (27 inHg) extratropical cyclone near Iceland in February 2020
- October 2021 Northeast Pacific bomb cyclone and November 2024 Northeast Pacific bomb cyclone – Strongest Pacific Northwest windstorms, both with pressures of 942 mbar (27.8 inHg)
