= January 2010 North American winter storms =

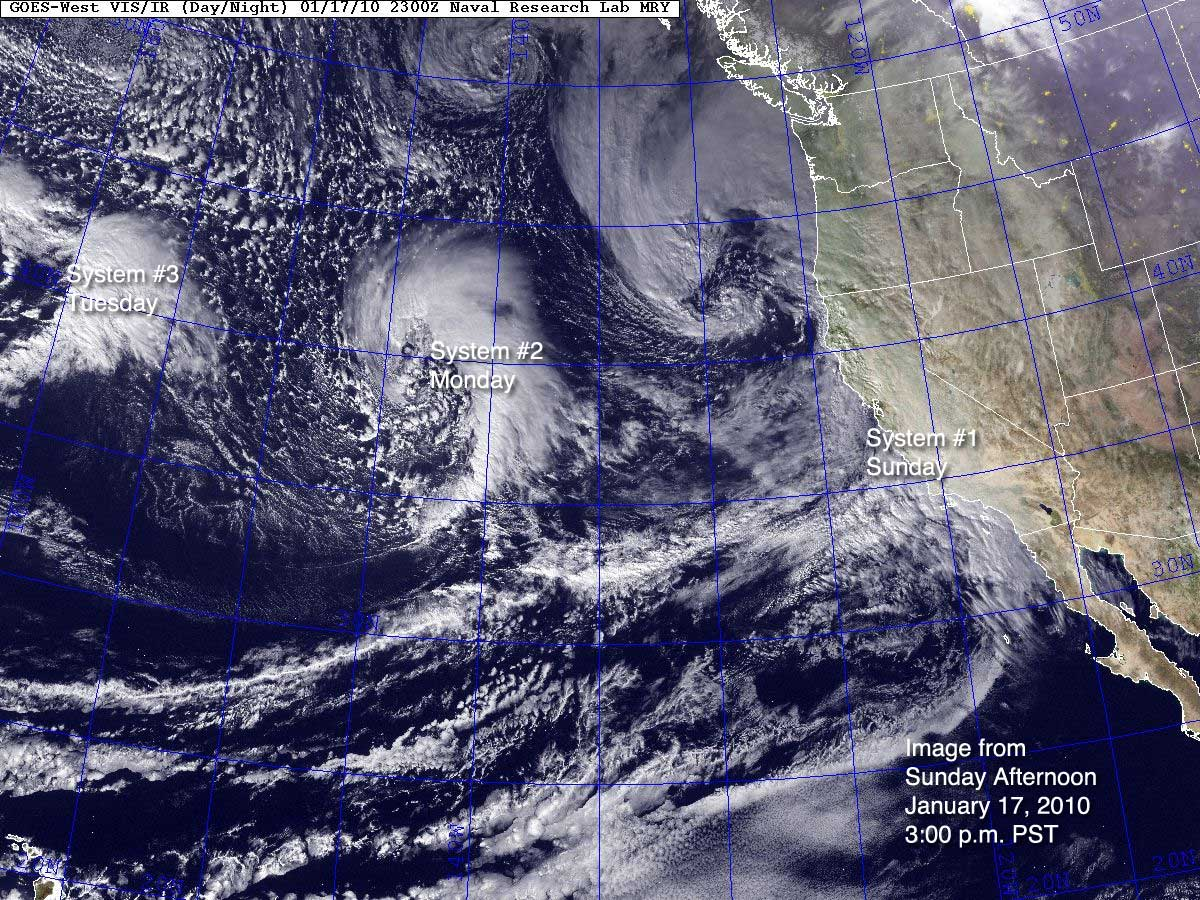
- The first wave of the January 2010 El Niño storms to affect California (Storms #2–4), on January 17.

Meteorological history
- Formed: January 14, 2010 (first storm formed)
- Dissipated: January 28, 2010 (sixth storm dissipated)

Tornado outbreak
- Tornadoes: 6 confirmed
- Max. rating: EF1 tornado

Winter storm
- Highest winds: 74 mph (119 km/h)
- Highest gusts: 94 mph (151 km/h)
- Lowest pressure: 964 mbar (28.5 inHg) (Storm #3)
- Max. rainfall: 20 inches (51 cm) at Sierra Nevada, California
- Max. snowfall: 90 inches (230 cm) at Mammoth Lakes, California.

Overall effects
- Fatalities: At least 10
- Damage: >$66.879 million (2010 USD)
- Areas affected: Japan; Alaska; Contiguous United States; Canada; northern Mexico; Greenland
- Part of the 2009–10 North American winter and tornado outbreaks of 2010

The January 2010 North American winter storms were a group of seven powerful winter storms that affected Canada and the Contiguous United States, particularly California. The storms developed from the combination of a strong El Niño episode, a powerful jet stream, and an atmospheric river that opened from the West Pacific Ocean into the Western Seaboard. The storms shattered multiple records across the Western United States, with the sixth storm breaking records for the lowest recorded air pressure in multiple parts of California, which was also the most powerful winter storm to strike the Southwestern United States in 140 years. The fourth, fifth, and sixth storms spawned several tornadoes across California, with at least 6 tornadoes confirmed in California (including two EF1 tornadoes); the storms also spawned multiple waterspouts off the coast of California. The storms dumped record amounts of rain and snow in the Western United States, and also brought hurricane-force winds to the U.S. West Coast, causing flooding and wind damage, as well as triggering blackouts across California that cut the power to more than 1.3 million customers. The storms killed at least 10 people, and caused more than $66.879 million (2010 USD) in damages.

== Meteorological History ==
Map plotting the track and intensity of the sixth and final winter storm of the storm train, according to the Saffir–Simpson scale Map key Saffir–Simpson scale Tropical depression (≤38 mph, ≤62 km/h) Tropical storm (39–73 mph, 63–118 km/h) Category 1 (74–95 mph, 119–153 km/h) Category 2 (96–110 mph, 154–177 km/h) Category 3 (111–129 mph, 178–208 km/h) Category 4 (130–156 mph, 209–251 km/h) Category 5 (≥157 mph, ≥252 km/h) Unknown Storm type Tropical cyclone Subtropical cyclone Extratropical cyclone, remnant low, tropical disturbance, or monsoon depression

From January 14 to 15, 2010, six extratropical disturbances developed over the north Pacific, within a large trough of low pressure, from the waters south of the Aleutian Islands to the east coast of Japan. Strengthened by an atmospheric river, a powerful jet stream with winds reaching 230 mph (370 km/h), and the most powerful El Niño event (the fourth-strongest one on record) since 1997–98, the storms quickly developed while accelerating eastward. On the afternoon of January 16, the first storm reached the Pacific Northwest. On the same day, a seventh, small cyclone developed to the northwest of the first storm, which looped northwestward into the Gulf of Alaska for a few days, before dissipating on January 19. The first storm moved ashore British Columbia on the afternoon of January 17, impacting the Pacific Northwest, before dissipating early on the next day, ending the first wave of storms.

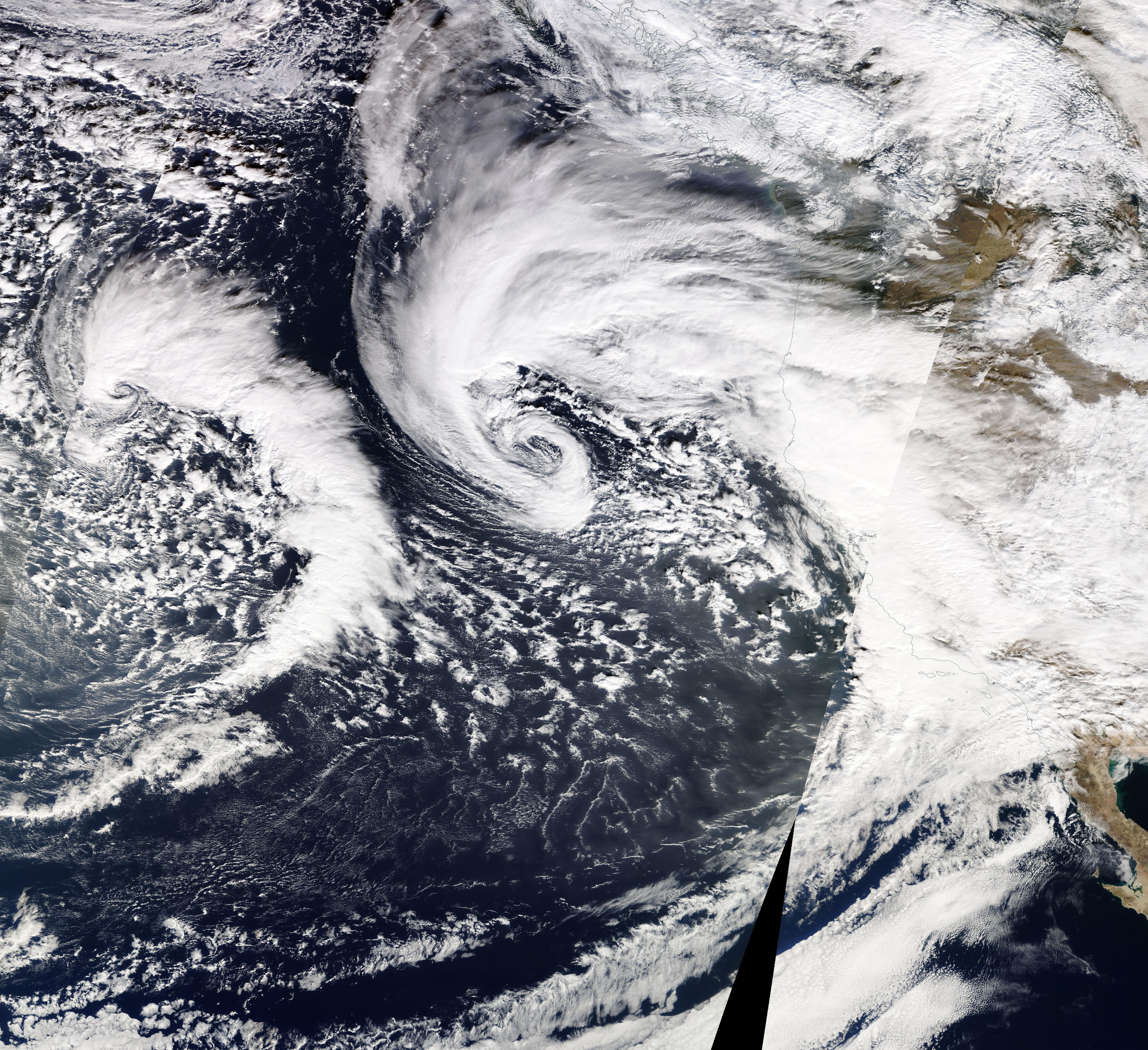
Satellite image of the third storm (the second storm to affect California) near peak intensity, on January 18

On the afternoon of January 17, the second storm, the first of five powerful storms to impact California, reached the West Coast of the United States, beginning a week of heavy rainfall and powerful gale-force winds. The storm was steered northeastward by a blocking ridge of high pressure over the Central United States, and made landfall on British Columbia on January 18, before dissipating late that day. As the second storm moved inland, the third storm arrived at the U.S. West Coast on January 18, bombing out and reaching a peak intensity of 964 millibars (28.5 inHg) at 18:00 UTC (10:00 a.m. PST) that day. Afterward, the third storm weakened and stalled of the coast of the Pacific Northwest while the fourth storm approached, which reached the U.S. West Coast on January 19. The fourth storm began a small tornado outbreak in California on January 19, which would last until January 21, and the fourth storm also spawned four waterspouts off the coast of Southern California. On the afternoon of January 19, the National Weather Service issued two tornado warnings for San Diego County within hours of each other. The third storm absorbed the fourth storm on January 20, restrengthening somewhat in the process. The third storm then moved into the Gulf of Alaska for another few days, before dissipating on January 23.

On January 20, the fifth storm, the fourth storm to affect California, reached the West Coast of the U.S., beginning the third and final wave of storms. The storm intensified as it neared the coast of Oregon, reaching a peak intensity of 970 millibars (29 inHg) as it approached the coast of Northern California. The fifth storm then moved northward and weakened, stalling over the northeast Pacific for another several days, before being absorbed into another approaching extratropical cyclone late on January 24.

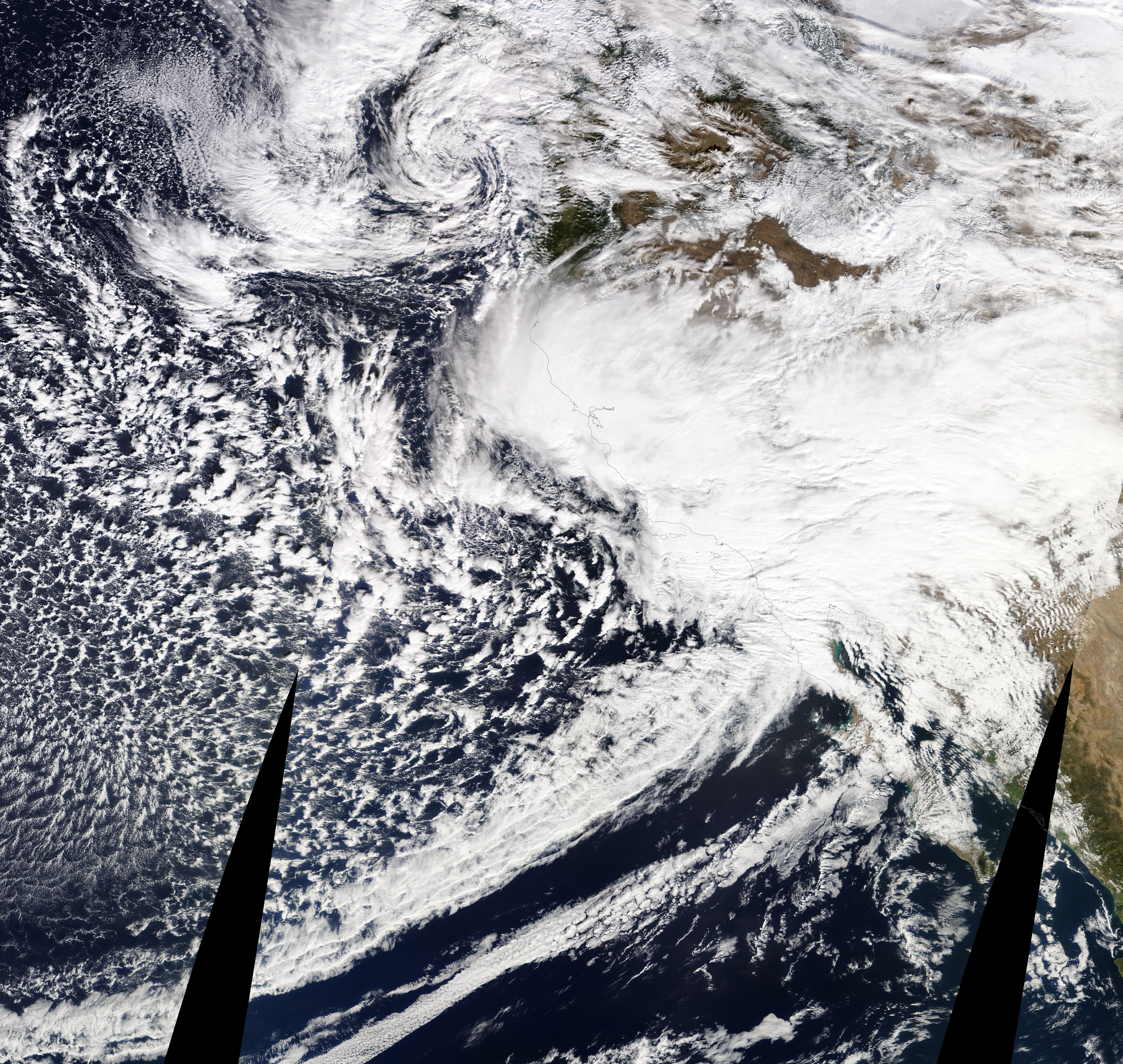
Satellite image of the sixth storm (the fifth storm to affect California) at peak intensity on January 21, shortly before landfall

On January 21, the sixth storm (the fifth and final storm to affect California) reached the West Coast of the U.S. The storm rapidly intensified as it approached California, reaching a peak intensity of 973 millibars (28.7 inHg) that afternoon, just prior to making landfall on California near San Francisco. This made the storm the most powerful winter storm to strike the Southwestern United States in 140 years. The storm also tapped into the Pineapple Express, boosting the amount of moisture in the storm. The storm broke low pressure records across California and Oregon as it moved inland, with a minimum pressure of 978 millibars (28.9 inHg) recorded in Eureka, California, and a minimum pressure of 987 millibars (29.1 inHg) recorded in San Diego County. The storm also produced an EF0 tornado in Ventura, California, as well as numerous waterspouts across Southern California. The powerful winter storm weakened as it moved inland, but continued to affect California until January 23. The ridge of high pressure previously stationed over the Central U.S. had broken down by then, allowing the powerful storm to move eastward across the mainland United States, with the storm expanding in size as it moved eastward. The sixth storm reached the Eastern United States on January 24, bringing rain and snow to the region. Over the next couple of days, the storm moved northeastward into Eastern Canada, becoming elongated during that time, with the southern part of the storm splitting off into a new winter storm. On January 27, the storm moved into the northern Hudson Bay and stalled, while gradually weakening. On January 28, the sixth storm was absorbed into another frontal storm approaching from the southwest.

== Impact ==
=== California ===
From Sunday, January 17 to Saturday, January 23, 2010, a series of five very powerful winter storms bore down on Southern California, before moving eastward on January 22. On January 18, 23,000 customers in Southern California lost power for a short time, due to the flooding caused by one of the storms. On January 19, a woman was killed by a tree that fell on her home. On January 19, the fourth storm impacted Southern California, bringing flooding and powerful winds to Santee in San Diego County. On the afternoon of January 19, the National Weather Service issued two tornado warnings for San Diego County within hours of each other, as potentially tornadic thunderstorms crossed the area.

As the fifth and second-strongest of the week's storms (impact-wise) slammed into California on January 20, officials predicted as much as four feet (1.2 meters) of snow would fall in Northern California. On the morning of January 20, more than 500 homes were evacuated as floods struck multiple regions in California, as up to 6 inches (15 centimeters) of rain fell in the storms that had impacted the state by that point. Rescue and flood prevention services soon brought the situation under control, but one man was killed when a tree fell onto his house. By then, flooding up to a feet deep had occurred in multiple areas, with Flash Flood Warnings remaining in effect for much of California. A sinkhole also opened up at an intersection in Ventura, which was expected to take days to fill in. Two horses also died after being hit by lightning in a Santa Barbara field. Rare tornado warnings were issued in parts of Southern California, including southern Los Angeles, Long Beach, San Diego County, and Anaheim. Flash flood watches covered Los Angeles, Santa Barbara, and Ventura Counties. On January 20, an EF0 tornado was reported in Southeastern San Diego County, which lasted for 1 minute, 30 seconds. On the same day, residents in Siskiyou County in Northern California lost power for 30 hours, due to wet, heavy snow taking down power lines. Jim Rouiller, the senior energy meteorologist at Planalytics Inc., said that the storms (particularly the sixth storm) were the worst series of storms the state had experienced since 1997 (when a series of powerful storms caused the New Year's Day 1997 Northern California Flood). On January 21, the sixth storm broke the record of the lowest pressure recorded in parts of California, as the sixth storm registered a minimum barometric pressure of 978 millibars (28.9 inHg) in Eureka, California, breaking the previous record set in 1891; the storm also registered a reading of 987 millibars (29.1 inHg) in San Diego County (the storm had a minimum central pressure of 973 millibars (28.7 inHg) while it was in the Pacific, at about this time). Rouiller expected that evening's storm to bring from 4 to 12 inches of rain, severe mudslides, a few tornadoes, and heavy mountain snow ranging from 6 to 15 feet across the Sierra Nevada mountain range.

California state water officials warned on January 21 that one week of heavy rain and snow was not enough to end the drought, which was entering its fourth year by 2010, though the precipitation from the storms had significantly reduced the severity of the drought. According to measurements on Thursday, January 21, the average water content of state's mountain ranges' snowpacks, considered the state's biggest de facto 'reservoir', was at 107% percent of normal capacity.

On January 22, the sixth storm caused heavy rainfall in parts of Los Angeles, leading to additional flooding. 500 people were evacuated from a small village in La Paz County, Arizona due to a flash flood. Freshly-fallen snow blanketed the north side of the San Gabriel Mountains on the morning of January 23, 2010, northwest of Wrightwood, California, after the sixth storm had left. Snow was also reported in many parts of California. During that week, the storms dropped 8 in (20 cm) to 10 in (25 cm) of rain in Los Angeles. By the end of that week, the storms had cut the power to more than 1.3 million customers in Southern California, due to the powerful winds downing power lines. The storms also left a mess of trash and debris on the beaches of Southern California. On January 25, Mayor Liz Harris of the City of Big Bear Lake issued a state of emergency, due to the damage caused by the storm.

In California, the storms dropped a maximum total of 20 inches (51 cm) of rain in the higher elevations of the Sierra Nevada, while a maximum total of 90 inches (230 cm) of snow was recorded at Mammoth Lakes. The sixth storm brought sustained winds of 74 mph (119 km/h) to the Western U.S., equivalent to a low-end Category 1 hurricane, with wind gusts up to 94 mph (151 km/h) recorded in Ajo, Arizona.

=== Elsewhere ===
In Arizona, the storms dropped a maximum total of 50.7 inches (129 cm) of snow at Flagstaff. In Yavapai County, floodwaters swept a child to his death. Near Wikieup, the Big Sandy River crested at 17.9 feet (5.5 m), breaking the previous record of 16.4 feet (5.0 m) previously set in Match 1978.

The sixth storm brought snow across the Great Plains, and even as far east as parts of both Pennsylvania and New Jersey.

Overall, the storms killed at least 10 people across the United States, and caused more than $66.879 million in damages, including $3.2 million in agricultural losses.

== Confirmed tornadoes ==
EFU	EF0	EF1	EF2	EF3	EF4	EF5
0	4	2	0	0	0	0

The storm systems triggered an outbreak of weak tornadoes between Santa Barbara and San Diego Counties in Southern California on January 19, which continued into January 21. EF1 damage was reported in the Huntington Beach harbor area in Orange County, and in Santa Barbara County, a local radio station reported that a sheriff's deputy had sighted a possible tornado, with roof damage near the Ocean Meadow Golf Course. A third tornado was reported by the public in Orange County, with cars overturned on the Pacific Coast Highway and roof damage in the area. Additional tornadoes and waterspouts were reported from another storm system on January 21, with damage reported in Blythe, California and Santa Barbara, California. Overall, six tornadoes were confirmed, which caused at least $3.52 million in damage.

=== January 18 event ===
List of confirmed tornadoes – Monday, January 18, 2010 (Note: All dates are based on the local time zone where the tornado touched down; however, all times are in Coordinated Universal Time for consistency.)
EF#	Location	County / Parish	State	Start Coord.	Time (UTC)	Path length	Max width	Damage (Note: All damage totals are in 2010 USD unless otherwise stated.)	Summary	Refs
EF0	West Fresno	Fresno	CA	36.73°N 119.86°W	2324 – 2330	0.53 mi (0.85 km)	15 yd (14 m)	$0	A trained storm spotter observed a tornado north of California State Route 180; no damage was reported.	

=== January 19 event ===
List of confirmed tornadoes – Tuesday, January 19, 2010
EF#	Location	County / Parish	State	Start Coord.	Time (UTC)	Path length	Max width	Damage	Summary	Refs
EF0	Isla Vista	Santa Barbara	CA	34.4248°N 119.877°W	1832 – 1836	0.14 mi (0.23 km)	10 yd (9.1 m)	$0	Law enforcement reported a small tornado; only minor damage was observed.	
EF1	S of Seal Beach	Orange	CA	33.716°N 118.125°W	2055 – 2059	4.62 mi (7.44 km)	25 yd (23 m)	$500,000	A parked Ford Explorer was flipped on its side. Two catamarans were lifted out of the water; one was tossed 50 ft (15 m) into the air, subsequently landing on another vessel and dock piling, and the second was flipped over, landing 30 ft (9.1 m) from its original position. A window to a residential building was blown in and multiple reports of roof damage were relayed. A mesonet station on the Huntington Beach Pier recorded a 92 mph (148 km/h) wind gust.	

=== January 21 event ===
List of confirmed tornadoes – Thursday, January 21, 2010
EF#	Location	County / Parish	State	Start Coord.	Time (UTC)	Path length	Max width	Damage	Summary	Refs
EF0	Ventura	Ventura	CA	34.2518°N 119.1949°W	2025 – 2028	1.51 mi (2.43 km)	67 yd (61 m)	$0	Several homes, a car, and an outbuilding were damaged.	
EF0	WSW of Ripley to NNE of Blythe	Riverside	CA	33.5105°N 114.7453°W	2310 – 2340	14.26 mi (22.95 km)	100 yd (91 m)	$3,000,000	Two semi-trucks were blown over, numerous power poles were downed, and several structures sustained considerable damage, including some houses that had their roofs blown off.	

=== January 23 event ===
List of confirmed tornadoes – Saturday, January 23, 2010
EF#	Location	County / Parish	State	Start Coord.	Time (UTC)	Path length	Max width	Damage	Summary	Refs
EF1	SW of Brentwood	Contra Costa	CA	37.9132°N 121.7658°W	2054 – 2055	1.64 mi (2.64 km)	2 yd (1.8 m)	$25,000	A utility pole was twisted, with the top portion of the pole splintered.	

== See also ==
- Columbus Day Storm of 1962
- Los Angeles County flood of 2005
- January 2008 North American storm complex
- October 2009 North American storm complex
- Global storm activity of 2010
- Tornadoes of 2010
- October 2010 North American storm complex
- December 2010 North American blizzard
- November 2011 Bering Sea cyclone
- January 2013 Northwest Pacific cyclone
- March 2014 North American winter storm
- November 2014 Bering Sea cyclone
- December 2014 North American storm complex
- January 2015 North American blizzard
- 2017 California floods
- 2022–2023 California floods
- El Niño
- La Niña
