= Great Arctic Cyclone of 2012 =

2012 Extratropical cyclone in Arctic

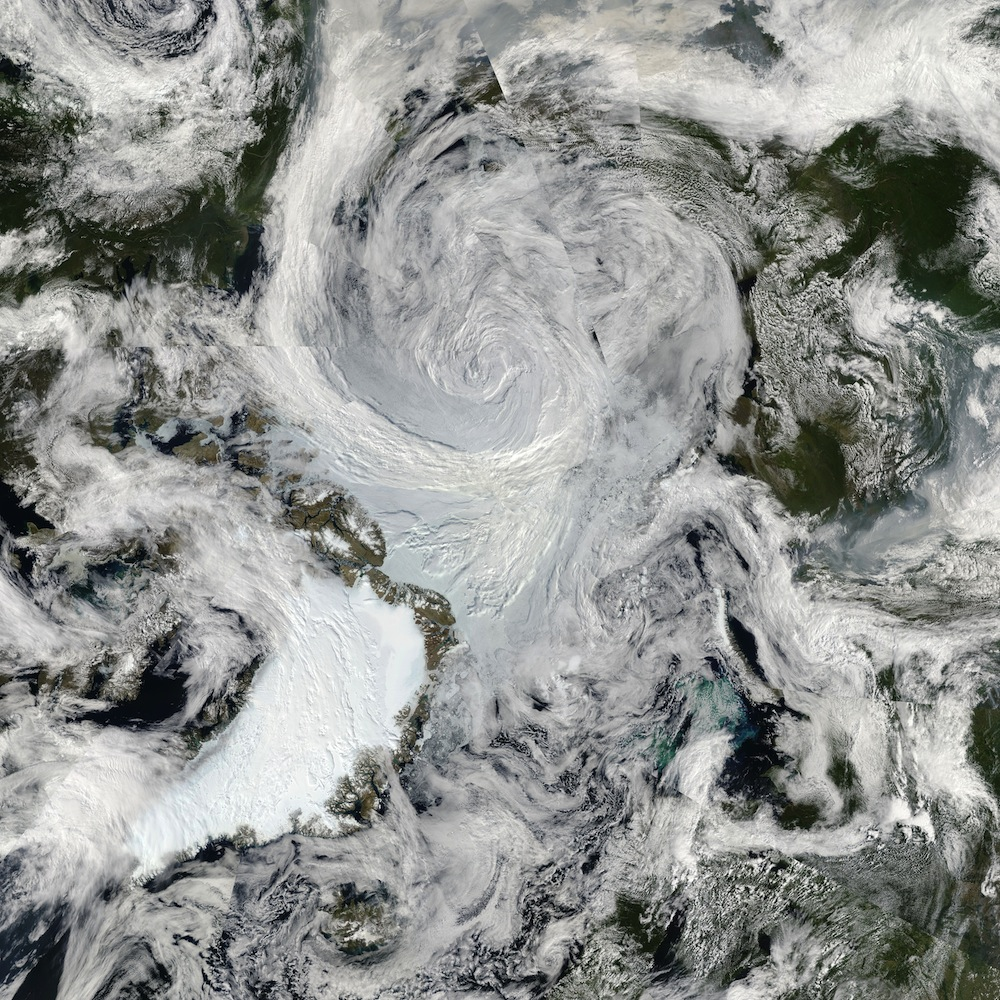
- Satellite image of Great Arctic Cyclone of 2012 (center) which was an unusually strong storm which formed over Siberia on August 2, 2012 and tracked into the center of the Arctic Ocean, where it slowly dissipated.

Meteorological history
- Formed: August 2, 2012
- Dissipated: August 14, 2012

Meteorological information
- Lowest pressure: 962 hPa (28.41 inHg)

Overall effects
- Areas affected: Siberia, Alaska, Arctic, Canadian Arctic Archipelago

The Great Arctic Cyclone, or "Great Arctic Cyclone of 2012", was a powerful extratropical cyclone that was centered on the Arctic Ocean in early August 2012. Cyclones of this magnitude are rare in the Arctic summer, although common in the winter. The Great Arctic Cyclone was the strongest summer storm in the Arctic and the 13th-strongest storm observed at any time in the Arctic, since satellite observations began in 1979.

Although the Great Arctic Cyclone did not cause the record melting of sea ice which occurred in 2012, turbulence from the storm is believed to have contributed to melting of sea ice, due to mechanical ice breakup and the rise of warmer saltier water from below; however the main oceanic heat source, associated with inflowing Atlantic water, remained isolated from the turbulence.

== Meteorological history ==
On August 2, 2012, an extratropical low formed over Siberia. During the next few days, the storm slowly drifted into the Arctic Ocean, while gradually strengthening. On August 5, the storm reached the Arctic Ocean and began to rapidly intensify, while drifting closer to the North Pole. On August 6, the extratropical cyclone reached a peak intensity of 962 mbar (28.4 inHg), while centered about halfway between Alaska and the North Pole. At this point, the Great Arctic Cyclone of 2012 was the strongest summer Arctic storm on record, since the beginning of records in 1979. Afterward, the storm slowly began to weaken, while drifting towards Canada. On August 12, the cyclone made landfall in the northern Canadian Arctic Archipelago, and slowly moved eastward across land, while rapidly weakening. Late on August 14, the Arctic cyclone dissipated over the far northern reaches of Canada.

== Records ==
The Great Arctic Cyclone of 2012 became the strongest Arctic storm in the summer on record, since records began in 1979. At its peak intensity of 962 mbar (28.4 inHg), the Great Arctic Cyclone was also the 13th-strongest Arctic storm overall, since reliable records began.

== See also ==
- Polar low
- Polar vortex
- November 2011 Bering Sea cyclone
- November 2014 Bering Sea cyclone
