= March 2014 North American winter storm =

Winter storm in 2014

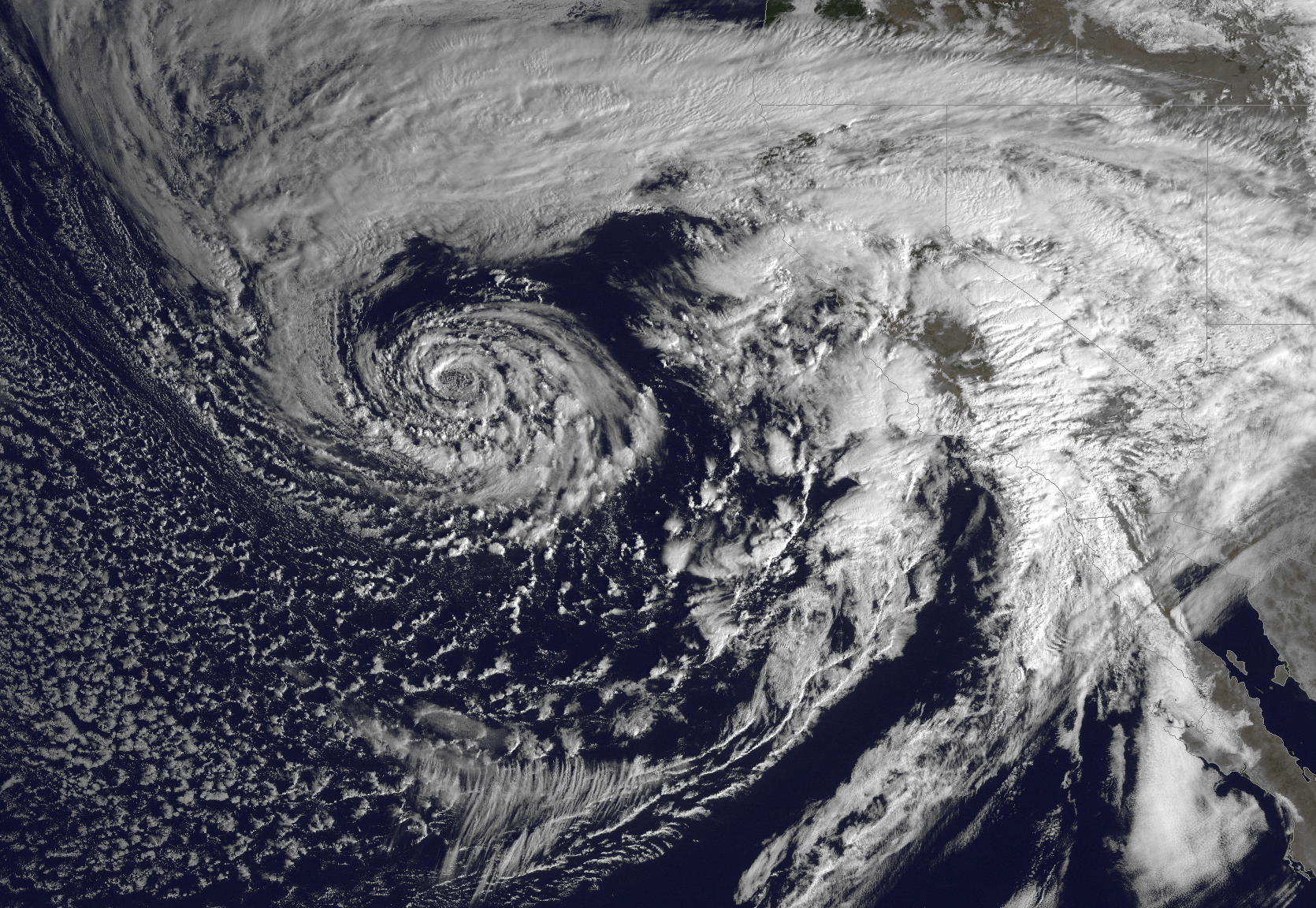
- Visible satellite imagery of the winter storm offshore California early on February 28, nearing peak intensity.

Meteorological history
- Formed: February 23, 2014
- Dissipated: March 4, 2014

Category 1 "Notable" winter storm
- Regional snowfall index: 1.09 (NOAA)
- Max. rainfall: 14.54 inches (369 mm) at Matilija Canyon (Ventura County), California.
- Max. snowfall: 40 inches (100 cm) near Kirkwood Ski Resort, California

Tornado outbreak
- Tornadoes: 2 confirmed
- Max. rating: EF0 tornado
- Highest gusts: 102 mph (164 km/h)
- Lowest pressure: 968 millibars (28.6 inHg)

Overall effects
- Fatalities: At least 16
- Areas affected: British Columbia; Western United States; Baja California; Northern Mexico; Eastern United States; Eastern Canada
- Part of the 2013–14 North American winter

The March 2014 North American winter storm, also unofficially referred to as Winter Storm Titan, was an extremely powerful winter storm that affected much of the United States and portions of Canada. It was one of the most severe winter storms of the 2013–14 North American winter storm season, storm affecting most of the Western Seaboard (especially California), and various parts of the Eastern United States, bringing damaging winds, flash floods, and blizzard and icy conditions.

== Meteorological history ==
Map plotting the storm's track and intensity, according to the Saffir–Simpson scale Map key Saffir–Simpson scale Tropical depression (≤38 mph, ≤62 km/h) Tropical storm (39–73 mph, 63–118 km/h) Category 1 (74–95 mph, 119–153 km/h) Category 2 (96–110 mph, 154–177 km/h) Category 3 (111–129 mph, 178–208 km/h) Category 4 (130–156 mph, 209–251 km/h) Category 5 (≥157 mph, ≥252 km/h) Unknown Storm type Tropical cyclone Subtropical cyclone Extratropical cyclone, remnant low, tropical disturbance, or monsoon depression

On February 23, 2014, an extratropical disturbance developed over the northeast Pacific. The system slowly began to intensify as it moved eastwards, before encountering an omega block that was situated over Alaska and the Northwest Pacific, on February 24, 2014. Over the next few days, the omega block began to dissipate, and the system began to intensify more rapidly as it moved towards the southeast. On February 27, 2014, meteorologists identified the system as having of high risk of having major impacts in the United States. Winter Weather Watches and Winter Storm Warnings were initiated in numerous portions of the Western United States. After a previous, weaker winter storm had moved through the West Coast on February 26, the winter storm turned towards California, resulting in Flash Flood warnings and high wind advisories being issued. During the next 2 days, the storm system underwent explosive intensification and also developed an eye-like feature, reaching an intensity of 976 millibars on February 27, before deepening further to its peak intensity of 968 millibars (28.6 inHg) on February 28. Around that time, the winter storm was predicted to bring ice, snow, and blizzard conditions to the Central and Eastern States of the US. Afterwards, the system slowly began to weaken as it continued bearing down on the West Coast, although it continued to maintain its organization. The storm brought powerful winds and heavy torrents throughout much of the Western Seaboard, especially in California. Flash floods ensued throughout many parts of the state, resulting in some road closures. Early on March 1, the eye of the storm disappeared as the organization of the system began to deteriorate. Later on March 1, the winter storm continued to shrink in size as it weakened further, and the storm began moving ashore in Southern California. A secondary circulation developed near the southern end of the storm's circulation, which quickly dominated the system; the original surface low became completely detached from the system and was absorbed into another approaching storm on March 3. On March 1, the winter storm also spawned an EF0 tornado over Arizona, which was the confirmed first tornado in the Greater Phoenix area since January 2005. Late on March 1, 2014, the winter storm's low-level circulation center made landfall over San Diego County. Several hours later, the winter storm passed through California, even as the storm weakened to 1,007 millibars (29.7 inHg) on March 2. The winter storm triggered severe thunderstorms, and dropped hail while it passed through the Southwestern United States. The storm began to accelerate towards the east while building up convection. During the next couple of days, the winter storm's structure began to break down; however, the storm still brought blizzard conditions and ice to the Eastern United States. Early on March 4, the winter storm weakened and exited the east coast of the Carolinas, before being absorbed into the circulation of a much larger extratropical cyclone centered over the Labrador Sea later that day.

== Impacts ==
On March 1, the storm caused at least 2 fatalities, at least 44 injuries, as well as several car accidents. On the same day, a plane was moved 3 feet (0.91 m) and damaged by a microburst, near the John Wayne Airport at Santa Ana, California. While moving eastward across the United States, the storm caused more road accidents, and downed numerous trees and power lines. The storm also produced an EF0 tornado 9 miles south of Karnak, California, which lasted for 5 minutes. Another person was killed in Kansas, along with a student in Oklahoma. The winter storm later killed another 12 people and injured dozens more, before the storm weakened and left the East Coast on March 4, 2014. Nearly 8,000 flights were canceled or delayed on March 3, and 832 flights were canceled and 3,903 flights were delayed on March 4.

=== Eastern United States ===
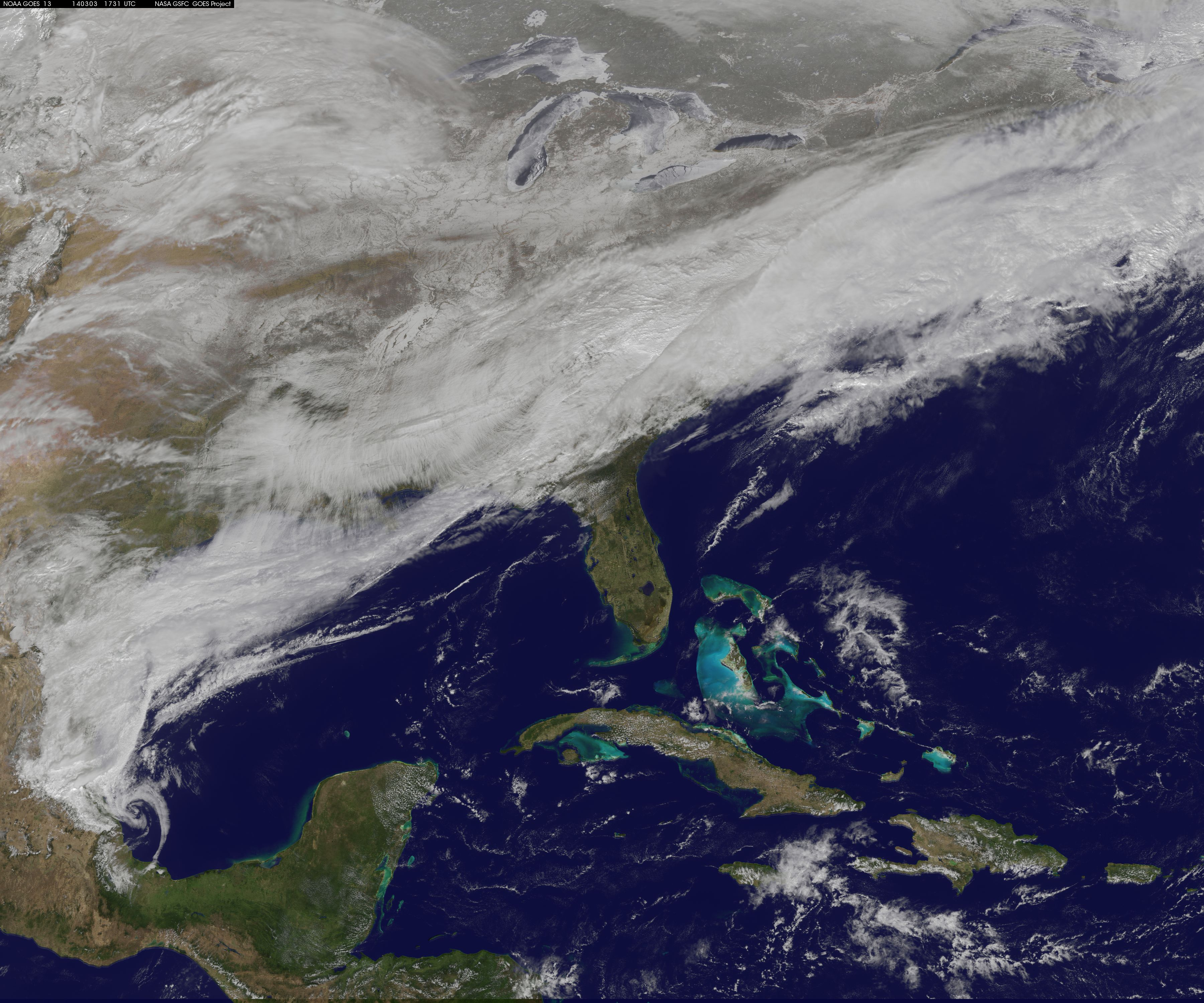
The winter storm over the Eastern and Midwestern United States on March 3.

In North Carolina, an inch of snow fell along the North Carolina Highway 264 corridor, and minor travel issues were noted with the winter storm system, though cars slid off North Carolina Highway 150 in Guilford County, causing slowdowns in both directions. Virginia Tech operations were impacted, with classes canceled and a medical center closed.

Recreational programs and parks at Ocean City, Maryland were canceled, along with a Maryland State Police snow emergency plan in effect for several counties in the state, including Worcester County. A hospital was also closed. This was also in place for Delaware, where driving restrictions were in place for the state.

Due to the heavy snowfall totals in New Jersey, numerous school districts delayed openings, and hundreds of flights were delayed or canceled at Newark Liberty International Airport. Schools were also opened late in Pennsylvania.

Across the Eastern United States, the highest snow total was 10 inches (25 cm) at Bruceton Mills, West Virginia.

=== Midwestern United States ===
In Kentucky, the roof of a Dollar General collapsed in Mayfield, Kentucky, causing six people to be evacuated and the store to be demolished. The Kentucky Department of Transportation warned drivers that the majority of all roads in the state were covered in ice. Interstate 65 in the northern part of the state was shut down for a short period on March 2.

In Indiana, numerous traffic accidents were reported around Indianapolis, and in New Albany, snow fell on roads, where the city was in short supply of salt, and used IMIX, a combination of natural sand and calcium chloride. 9.8 inches of snow fell in Portage, Indiana, which was the highest snowfall total in the Midwestern United States. Crashes were reported on Interstate 65 in Gary, including a rollover and a chain-reaction crash.

In Tennessee, governor Bill Haslam declared a state of emergency, along with the Tennessee Emergency Management Agency activating at a Level 3. Several inches of sleet fell across the state, which prompted government buildings, schools, businesses, and colleges to close on March 3. 62,000 power outages were reported in Shelby County, and the Hernando de Soto Bridge gridlocked due to stopped and stalled trucks, trapping motorists in their vehicles for up to 12 hours. Governor Haslam requested a disaster declaration in the aftermath of the storm.

In Ohio, snow emergencies were in effect for several counties. The John A. Roebling Suspension Bridge was closed due to ice on its metal grid decking, and the Ohio Department of Transportation urged drivers to give snow plows more room to clear snow off highways. The department had also ordered salt to assist communities in need of salt for melting snow, though demand for it had outpaced supply.

In Illinois, the highest snow total was 5.5 inches (14 cm) near Hillsdale. Winter weather advisories were in place for portions of the state.

In Missouri, 5 inches (13 cm) of sleet was also reported in Dudley and Pemiscot County.

=== Southern United States ===
In Arkansas, 4.5 inches (11 cm) of sleet fell at Biggers, in which the ice and sleet caused accidents along Interstate 40 and Interstate 55, causing motorists to be stranded overnight. The sleet and ice in Louisiana caused a 60 miles (97 km) closure along Interstate 10 between Lafayette and Lake Charles, where some Mardi Gras events were canceled. During Mardi Gras festivities in New Orleans, temperatures were as low as 39 °F (4 °C) on the afternoon of March 4, the second-most coldest Mardi Gras event in New Orleans on record, 1 degree shy of 38 °F (3 °C), which was set in 1899. Attendance was also lowered at the event, and the parade was shortened for high school and college units, which included dozens of bands.

In Texas, 2 inches (5.1 cm) of sleet fell in Quitman and Van, which caused power outages, with 7,100 power outages in the Houston area. Ice accumulated 0.25 inches (6.4 mm) southwest of Katy.

The highest snowfall total across the southern United States was in Miami, Oklahoma, where 5.5 inches (14 cm) of snow fell.

=== Western United States ===
In California, on February 28, 40 inches (100 cm) of snow fell near the Kirkwood Ski Area, and 14.54 inches (369 mm) of rain fell at Matilija Canyon in Ventura County. The Los Angeles area received a range of 2–5 inches (5.1–12.7 cm) of rainfall. The maximum wind gust measured was 102 miles per hour, recorded near Big Bear Resort, near Los Angeles, on February 28. Due to the heavy rainfall, mudslides were observed in the eastern San Gabriel Valley, and caused evacuation orders for Glendora, Monrovia, and Azusa, particularly the Colby Fire burn scar area. Severe thunderstorms containing 1 inch (2.5 cm) hail was reported at Walnut in the morning hours of March 1.

Wind gusts of 77 miles per hour (124 km/h) near Mt. Charleston, Nevada, at an elevation of 8,818 feet (2,688 m), and a wind gust of 64 miles per hour (103 km/h) was recorded at Grand Canyon Airport, Arizona. Pea-sized hail was reported in Peoria, Arizona, and a snowfall total of 20 inches (51 cm) was recorded in Taos, New Mexico.

==== Tornadoes ====
EFU	EF0	EF1	EF2	EF3	EF4	EF5
0	2	0	0	0	0	0

A total of two tornadoes were reported from this storm system.

On February 28, an EF0 tornado was reported 9 miles south of Karnak, California, moved north at 25 miles per hour (40 km/h), and lasted for 5 minutes before dissipating.

On March 1, an EF0 tornado touched down in a park in Arizona and moved over an apartment complex, damaging roof tiles, blowing in a car's windshield and two apartment windows, and lifting a hot tub up into the clouds. Several trees and a power pole were downed as well. This was the first confirmed tornado in the Greater Phoenix area since January 2005, and caused $50,000 in damage.

== See also ==
- Tornadoes of 2014
- January 2008 North American storm complex
- October 2009 North American storm complex
- January 2010 North American winter storms
- March 2010 North American winter storm
- February 2013 nor'easter
- March 2013 nor'easter
- Early 2014 North American cold wave
- February 11–17, 2014 North American winter storm
- March 2014 nor'easter
- December 2014 North American storm complex
- January 2015 North American blizzard
