= November 2014 North American cold wave =

Weather event in North America

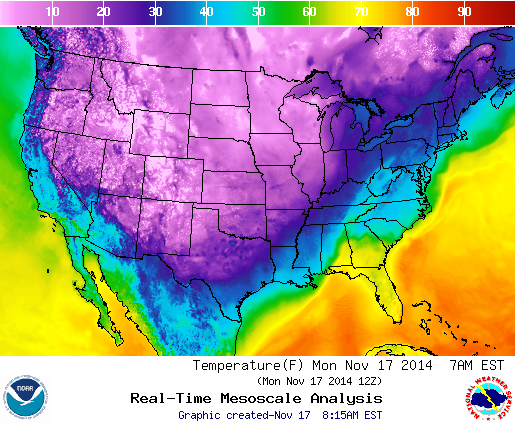
- A temperature map of the frigid conditions on November 17, 2014.

Meteorological history
- Formed: November 8, 2014
- Dissipated: November 23, 2014

Cold wave
- Lowest temp: −34.0 °F (−36.7 °C) in Thermopolis, WY on November 14

Overall effects
- Fatalities: At least 30 (Note: 24 of those deaths are a result of the November 13-21, 2014 North American winter storm)
- Areas affected: Canada; Contiguous United States; Northern Mexico
- Part of the 2014–15 North American winter

The November 2014 North American cold wave was an extreme weather event that occurred across most of Canada and the contiguous United States, including parts of the Western United States up to western California. One of the first events of the winter, the cold wave was caused by the northward movement of an extremely powerful bomb cyclone associated with Typhoon Nuri's remnant, which shifted the jet stream far northward, creating an omega block pattern. This allowed a piece of the polar vortex to advance southward into the Central and Eastern United States, bringing record-cold temperatures to much of the region. In contrast, Alaska experienced above-average temperatures.

This was the worst cold wave that the North American region had experienced since an earlier cold wave in early 2014. The cold wave was expected to last for a few weeks, extending at least until American Thanksgiving. Although the Omega Block broke down on November 20, due to a powerful storm moving into the Gulf of Alaska, frigid conditions continued to persist across much of the United States. There was also concern among some meteorologists that another cold wave or abnormally cold trend might persist throughout the winter of 2014–15, the chances of which were "above average." On November 23, a warming trend primarily in the Eastern United States brought an end to the cold wave; however, below-average temperatures were forecast to return to the Midwest by November 24. Despite the development of a second cold wave, it ended on December 6, when a ridge of high pressure brought above-average temperatures to the region, especially in the Central United States.

== Origins ==
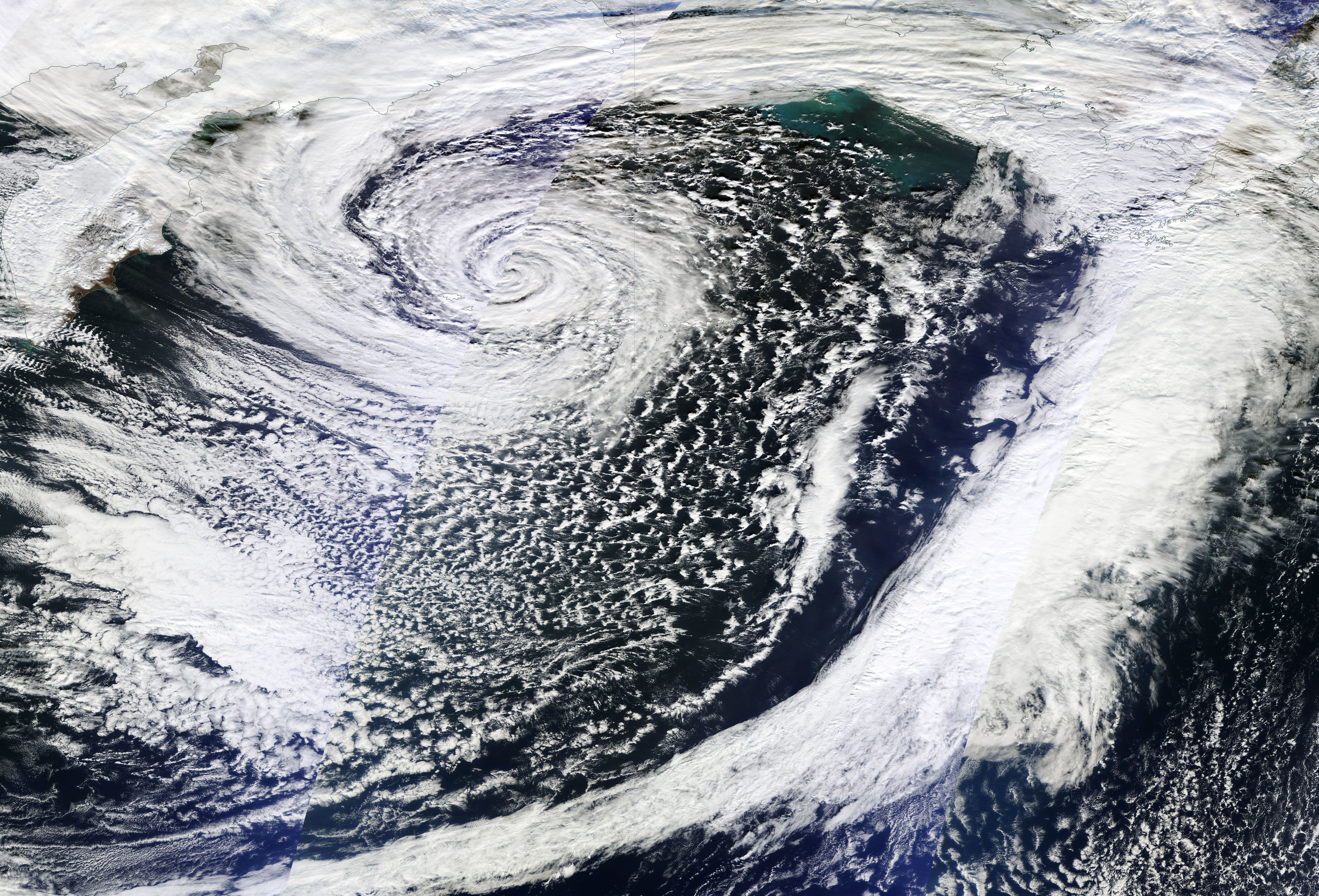
The 2014 Bering Sea bomb cyclone at peak intensity on November 8, over the Bering Sea. This system triggered the cold wave across North America.

On November 8, the northward movement of a bomb cyclone associated with Typhoon Nuri's remnants shifted the jet stream far to the north, creating an omega block pattern, which allowed a fragment of the polar vortex to descend from Arctic region into lower Canada and the Eastern United States, affecting up to 200 million people with colder-than-normal temperatures and early snowstorms. Although the Omega block broke down on November 20, a powerful storm brought more frigid temperatures. The wave ended on December 6 when an area of high pressure moved in.

Some meteorologists also predicted that the winter of 2014–15 would be abnormally cold across the Eastern United States (though on October 16 the NOAA predicted warmer than average winter temperatures in the Northeast), due to early snowfall in Siberia, and a weak but developing El Niño, which are both factors in erratic jet stream behavior that could lead to an abnormally cold winter. That prediction turned out to be very accurate, and 2014-15 was indeed a very cold winter in the Northeast.

== Record temperatures ==
=== United States ===
November 18 was the coldest November morning since 1976 with a national average temperature of 19.4 °F (−7.0 °C) and below-freezing temperatures reported in all 50 states. On that date, Joplin set a record low for the entire month of November, at 6 °F (−14 °C). Houston had its earliest fall freeze since 1999, and Kansas City also dipped down to 6 °F (−14 °C). In Boise, a record low of 5 °F (−15 °C) was established. Paducah set a record low of 10 °F (−12 °C), Evansville dipped down to 9 °F (−13 °C), and Cape Girardeau, Missouri got down to 8 °F (−13 °C). Some U.S. locations had temperatures 45 °F (25 °C) below normal. Sub-zero highs were recorded in Montana, Wyoming and Colorado, and sub-freezing highs were recorded as far as Texas.

On November 13, Casper, Wyoming had its lowest temperature ever recorded in November, with a record low of −27 °F (−33 °C), and Denver, Colorado had a low of −14 °F (−26 °C), the second-coldest ever recorded for that month. On November 18, Detroit tied a record of 11 °F (−12 °C), first set in 1880. Cleveland also tied a record low that morning of 10 °F (−12 °C), first set in 1959, and also became the coldest temperature for any date so early in the season in Cleveland since 1959 as well. Jacksonville, Florida reached 24 °F (−4 °C) on November 20, 2014, breaking a record set in 1873.

The cold wave brought an end to the navigation season on the upper Mississippi River, the earliest closing since records began in 1969.

Overall, November 2014 was the 16th coldest November in the contiguous United States, and the coldest since 2000. Alabama and Mississippi saw their 2nd coldest November, and 16 other states had a top ten cold November.

== Related weather ==
=== United States ===
A severe and persistent lake-effect snow event hit the Great Lakes snowbelt regions, triggered by a winter storm that emerged from Canada, to the north of the Midwest.

On November 10, St. Cloud, Minnesota had the biggest snowfall ever in November with 13.2 inches (34 cm). By the next day, Ishpeming, Michigan had 24.5 inches (62 cm), the most of any location.

In Buffalo, New York, another winter storm triggered a strong lake-effect band, which impacted the city and its immediate southern suburbs from November 17–19, 2014, with a second wave hitting November 20 before shifting southward and weakening. As much as 65 inches fell in Cheektowaga. Snow fell at rates as high as five inches per hour. However, nearby regions of Buffalo only received between one and six inches from the storm. Once the band dissipated, the risk of flooding became a significant concern, as temperatures were forecast to rise sharply and rain was forecast to enter the area beginning November 23, causing the snowpack to melt rapidly.

South Bend, Indiana received 12.3 inches on November 13, breaking its old record for that day of five inches.

Snow depths of greater than 24 inches were reported in numerous location across the Upper Peninsula of Michigan. with 42.5 inches reported near Ishpeming between November 10–12. Gaylord and Sault Ste. Marie, Michigan had each reported over 50 inches of snow in November. Allendale in west Michigan received 20.4 inches with 17 inches in East Grand Rapids.

On November 23, the formation of a ridge of high pressure across the Southeastern United States forced the polar vortex fragment over the Eastern United States to retreat back to Canada, allowing a warming trend across much of the Midwest and the Eastern United States. However, this same warming trend brought concerns that the resulting snowmelt and incoming rain may cause floods in the region.

== Impact ==
=== United States ===
Sustained winds of 110 km/h (70 mph) with gusts to 156 km/h (97 mph) were recorded on the island of Shemya. Only minor damage was reported on the island which houses a United States Air Force installation. On November 12, a winter storm in the Great Lakes region killed four people in Minnesota. On November 17, another winter storm caused the deaths of at least 11 people in traffic-related accidents. By November 19, another seven people had died in western New York from the cold temperatures brought by that same winter storm. On November 20, another person died from the cold. On November 22, the death toll from the November 13–21 winter storm increased to 13 fatalities (not including 11 earlier traffic accidents). In addition, early on November 20, a man froze to death near Chicago. The temperature was 14 °F (−10 °C).

== See also ==
- 2013–14 North American winter storms
- 2013–14 North American cold wave
- 2014 Bering Sea bomb cyclone
- 2014–15 North American winter
- December 2013 North American storm complex
- February 11–17, 2014 North American winter storm
- January 2014 Gulf Coast winter storm
- North American Ice Storm of 1998
