= November 2011 Bering Sea cyclone =

Extratropical cyclone in East Asia and Alaska

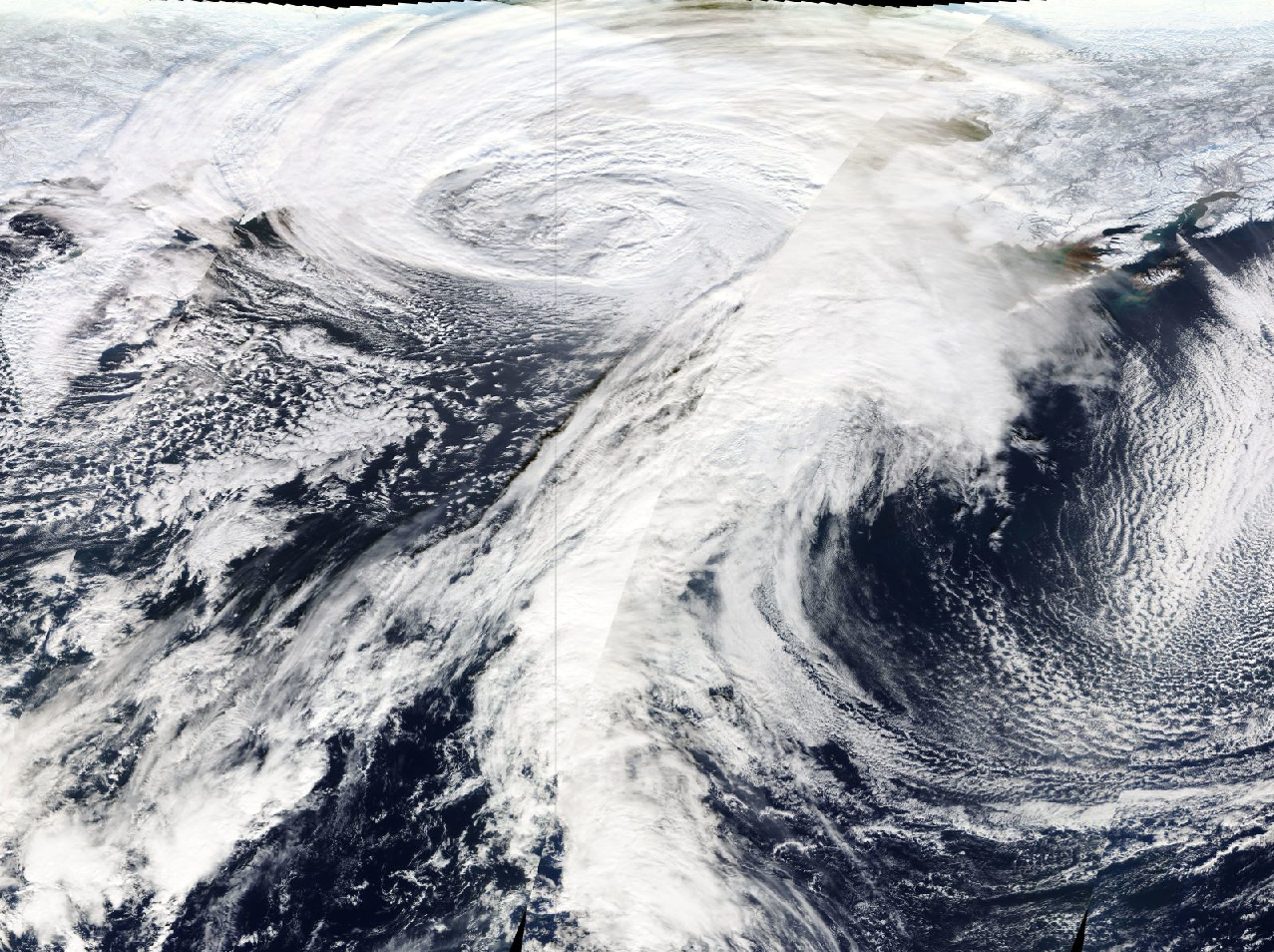
- Satellite image of the storm at peak intensity on November 8

Meteorological history
- Formed: November 4, 2011
- Dissipated: November 11, 2011

Extratropical cyclone
- Highest gusts: 93 mph (150 km/h) on Little Diomede Island
- Lowest pressure: 943 hPa (mbar); 27.85 inHg

Blizzard
- Lowest temp: Wind chill of −17 °F (−27 °C) in Red Dog Dock, Alaska
- Max. snowfall: 6.4 in (16 cm) in Nome, Alaska

Overall effects
- Fatalities: 1
- Damage: At least $24 million
- Areas affected: Northeast China, North Korea, South Korea, Japan, Alaska, Chukotka
- Part of the 2011–12 North American winter

The November 2011 Bering Sea cyclone was one of the most powerful extratropical cyclones to affect Alaska on record. On November 8, the National Weather Service (NWS) began issuing severe weather warnings, saying that this was a near-record (or record) storm in the Bering Sea. It rapidly deepened from 973 mb (28.7 inHg) to 948 mb (28.0 inHg) in just 24 hours before bottoming out at 943 mbar (hPa; 27.85 inHg), roughly comparable to a Category 3 or 4 hurricane. The storm had been deemed life-threatening by many people. The storm had a forward speed of at least 60 mph (97 km/h) before it had reached Alaska. The storm began affecting Alaska in the late hours of November 8, 2011. The highest gust recorded was 93 mph (150 km/h) on Little Diomede Island. One person was reported missing after being swept into the Bering Sea, and he was later pronounced dead.

== Meteorological synopsis ==
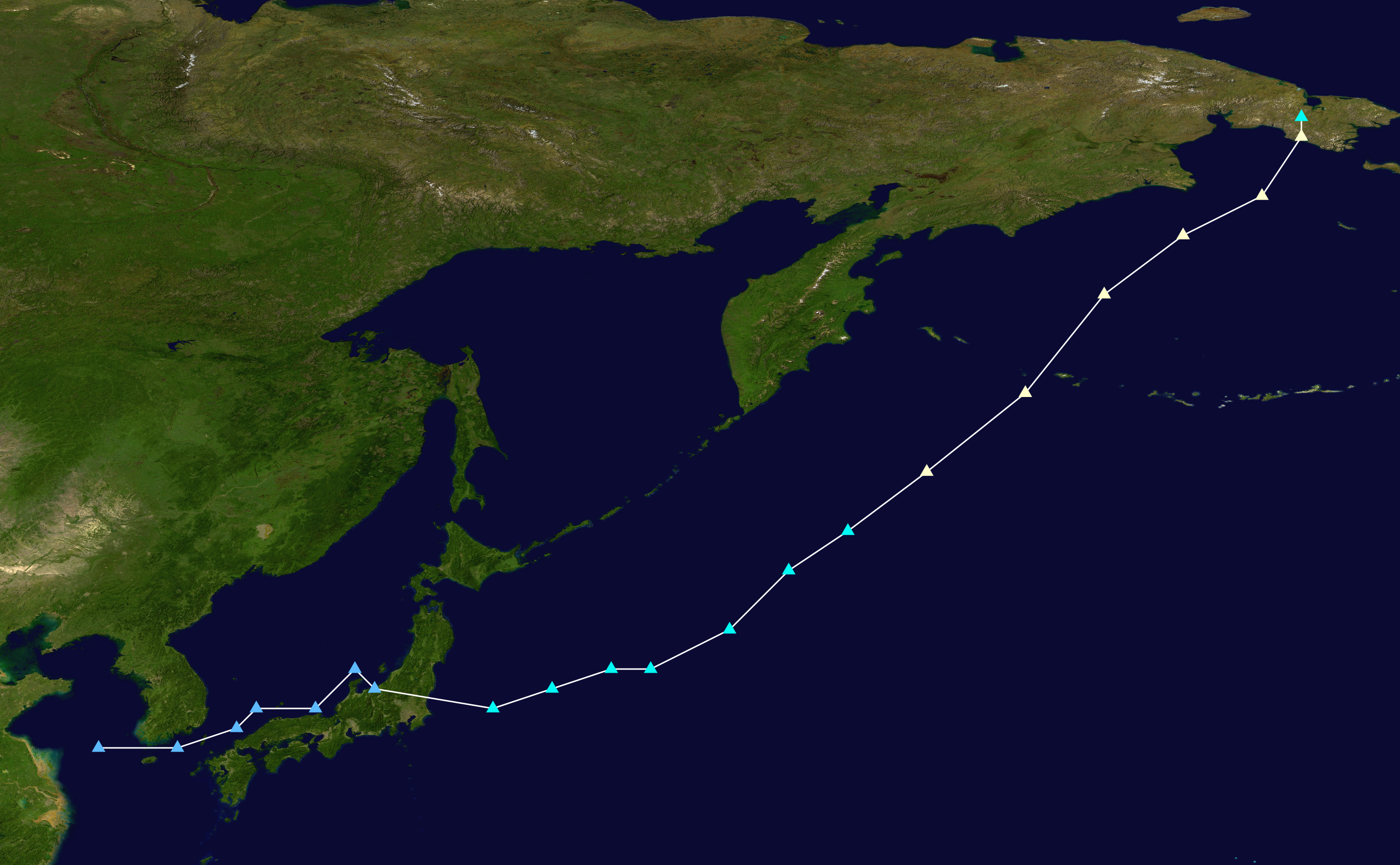
Map plotting the storm's track and intensity, according to the Saffir–Simpson scale Map key Saffir–Simpson scale Tropical depression (≤38 mph, ≤62 km/h) Tropical storm (39–73 mph, 63–118 km/h) Category 1 (74–95 mph, 119–153 km/h) Category 2 (96–110 mph, 154–177 km/h) Category 3 (111–129 mph, 178–208 km/h) Category 4 (130–156 mph, 209–251 km/h) Category 5 (≥157 mph, ≥252 km/h) Unknown Storm type Tropical cyclone Subtropical cyclone Extratropical cyclone, remnant low, tropical disturbance, or monsoon depression

In early November 2011, an extratropical cyclone developed over the western Pacific Ocean. Gradually intensifying, the system moved rapidly northeastward at 60 mph (97 km/h) and reached the southern Aleutian Islands by November 8, with a barometric pressure estimated at 960 mbar (hPa; 28.35 inHg). Though still intensifying, winds associated with the storm were already estimated in excess of hurricane-force. By 9:00 p.m. AKST, the system had attained a pressure of around 943 mbar (hPa; 27.85 inHg) while it was near the Gulf of Anadyr. This made it one of the most powerful storms on record in the region, comparable to the November 1974 storm in Nome, Alaska, which was regarded as "the most severe in Nome in 113 years of record keeping." According to the National Weather Service (NWS), the system was forecast to have sustained winds of 80 mph (130 km/h) over an area the size of Colorado. After weakening somewhat, the storm crossed the Chukotsk Peninsula around 9:00 a.m. AKST on November 9 before moving over the Chukchi Sea later that day. Once back over water, the extratropical cyclone turned towards the northwest and was last noted as a 975 mbar (hPa; 28.80 inHg) low on November 10, about 150 mi (240 km) north of Wrangel Island, before dissipating on the next day.

== Preparations ==
On November 7 and 8, the NWS issued hurricane wind warnings, flood warnings and blizzard warnings for most of Western Alaska. The storm came after almost 7,000 people in the Kenai Peninsula lost power in a previous storm the week before. An Alaskan village called Kivalina built a wall to protect waves from flooding the village. The storm was expected to test the walls sturdiness. In case the wall fell down, people who live in Kivalina would be evacuated. Storm surges were expected to be up to 8–10 feet. The U.S. Coast Guard staged helicopters around the western coast of Alaska in case of any emergencies. People in Unalakleet, Alaska began to board up their windows on November 8. The Alaskan Homeland Security helped villages prepare for the storm.

== Impact ==
From November 8, temperatures around Alaska began decreasing. In Anchorage, temperatures the previous day were 18 °F (−8 °C), but temperatures began decreasing to 6 °F (−14 °C) during the afternoon. In Nome, AK, tides had risen up to 7 feet (2.1 m), with waters moving up to bases of people's homes. Windchill temperatures south of Kivalina were −14.1 °F (−25.6 °C) with winds gusting to 70 miles per hour (110 km/h). Many low-lying areas experienced flooding, including Nome.

Across much of western Alaska's coastline, the storm caused widespread erosion and coastal flooding from a combination of storm surge and waves estimated between 30 and 40 ft (9.1 and 12.2 m). The most significant effects were felt in and around Nome where sea levels rose 8.73 ft (2.66 m) above normal, flooding low-lying areas. The Cape Nome Jetty sustained approximately $500,000 in damage. Although the surge did not over-top the seawall, water from breaking waves washed over and inundated a sewer and water treatment plant. The pumps at the facility were overwhelmed and 165,000 gallons of raw wastewater was discharged into a small harbor. Several other buildings in the area had basement flooding but no significant losses took place. A significant portion of the Nome-Council road was washed out or severely damaged by the storm, and damage was estimated at $24 million. Coastal damage throughout the city of Nome was estimated at $80,000.

The storm caused widespread damage to approximately 37 communities on the Western Alaskan coast. Damage included coastal erosion caused by storm surge, roof and other structural damage to homes and businesses, and loss of heat and electricity.

A fishing vessel was lost in the severe weather after the crew was ordered to abandon ship. The crew was rescued by the United States Coast Guard.

== Aftermath ==
Forecasters at the NWS predicted a second strong storm; however, the forecasted storm was not expected to cause as much damage. Other low-pressure areas spawned by this storm were expected to bring heavy rain to British Columbia and the West Coast of the United States. On November 11, 2011, the National Weather Service issued hurricane-force wind warnings and storm warnings for Western Alaska with coastal flood warnings for the Alaska Peninsula. The second storm attained a minimum central pressure of 954 millibars (28.2 inHg) on November 12, 2011.

On December 22, President Barack Obama issued a disaster declaration due to the large amount of destruction caused by the storm.

== Other notable storms in the Bering Sea ==
Storms analysed below 948 millibars (28.0 inHg) by the National Weather Service occur on average 5 times per year in the Bering Sea area, where one or two per year see their central pressure drop below 930 millibars (27 inHg). 2011 also saw a low pressure reach 939 mb (27.7 inHg) on April 6, however this storm was less damaging as the wind-field was strongest out to sea.

- November 2014: An extratropical cyclone that absorbed the remnants of Typhoon Nuri intensified to a minimum central pressure of 920 millibars (mbar), while meteorologists in the United States estimated its minimum pressure to be 924 millibars.
- September 2005 and October 2004: Two powerful extratropical storms, one of which was the remnants of Typhoon Ma-on that reached a minimum pressure of 941 mb, brought high storm surges to the Alaskan coast.
- October 25–26, 1977: Saw what has been described as the most powerful storm in Alaska in modern times, until it was eclipsed by the November 2014 Bering Sea bomb cyclone. A minimum pressure of 926 millibars (27.3 inHg) was recorded on the island of Unalaska, with winds in the Aleutian islands gusting at 130 mph (210 km/h). The storm had its origins as a West Pacific Typhoon.
- November 1974: A storm brought the highest storm surge to Nome 13 feet (4.0 m) above normal.
- February 25, 1951: Recorded Alaska's highest sustained one-minute wind speed of 93 mph (150 km/h) at Kotzebue.
- December 7, 1950: Saw the strongest wind gust ever recorded in Alaska, with a maximum gust of 159 mph (256 km/h) measured at Attu in the far west Aleutian Islands.

Strong Bering Sea storms affecting Alaska typically form as East Asian-northwest Pacific storms, as cold, dry air masses from Siberia meet with mild and moist sub-tropical air masses off the coast of Japan where they can rapidly deepen above the Kuroshio Current, before heading towards Alaska. These storms develop in a similar manner to the formation of extratropical cyclones in the North Atlantic, although they tend not to reach the absolute low pressures recorded there, such as 913 mb (27.0 inHg) during the Braer Storm of January 1993.

== See also ==
- Explosive cyclogenesis
- Great Gale of 1880
- Columbus Day Storm of 1962
- January 2013 Northwest Pacific cyclone
- November 2014 Bering Sea cyclone
- Great Arctic Cyclone of 2012
- Typhoon Merbok (2022)
