= Typhoon Nuri (2014) =

Pacific typhoon in 2014

Typhoon Nuri (Paeng)
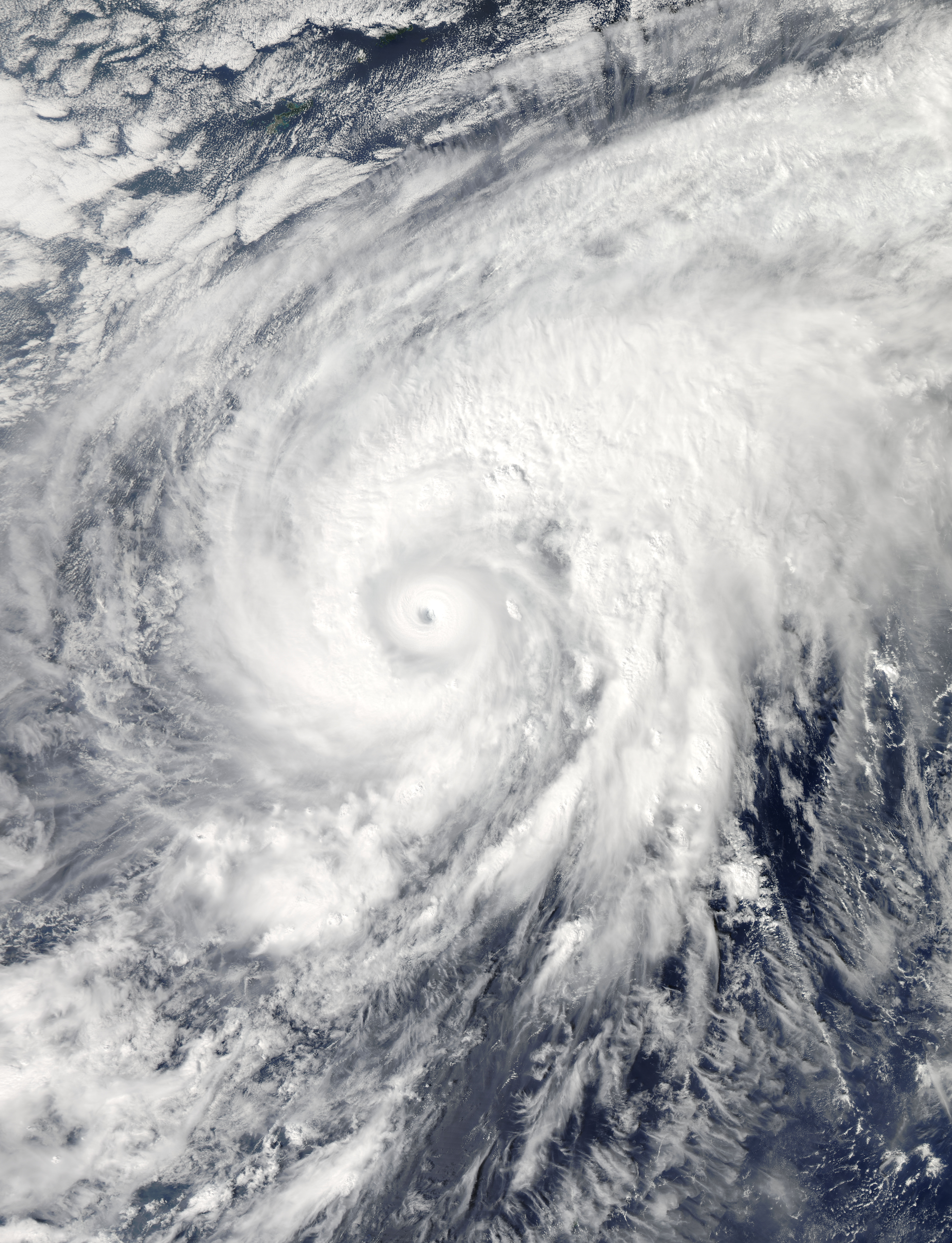
- Typhoon Nuri at peak intensity on November 3

Meteorological history
- Formed: October 30, 2014
- Extratropical: November 6, 2014
- Dissipated: November 7, 2014

Violent typhoon
- 10-minute sustained (JMA)
- Highest winds: 205 km/h (125 mph)
- Lowest pressure: 910 hPa (mbar); 26.87 inHg

Category 5-equivalent super typhoon
- 1-minute sustained (SSHWS/JTWC)
- Highest winds: 285 km/h (180 mph)
- Lowest pressure: 907 hPa (mbar); 26.78 inHg

Overall effects
- Fatalities: None
- Damage: Minimal
- Areas affected: Japan
- IBTrACS
- Part of the 2014 Pacific typhoon season

Typhoon Nuri, (Note: The name Nuri (Malay: nuri, [nuri]) was contributed by Malaysia and means parrot in Malay.) known in the Philippines as Super Typhoon Paeng, was the third most intense tropical cyclone worldwide in 2014. The system developed into a tropical storm and received the name Paeng from the PAGASA on October 31, before it intensified into a typhoon on the next day. Under very favorable conditions, especially the synoptic scale outflow, Nuri underwent rapid deepening and reached its peak intensity on November 2, forming a round eye in a overall symmetric Central dense overcast (CDO). Maintaining an impressive structure for over one day, The storm began to weaken on November 4, with a cloud-filled eye.

Due to the vertical wind shear from the mid-latitude westerlies, Nuri lost its eye on November 5, and deep convection continued to deteriorate the system. The storm accelerated northeastward and completely became extratropical on November 6. However, on the next day, the main circulation of the storm was divided, and a new center absorbed the entire circulation.

== Meteorological history ==
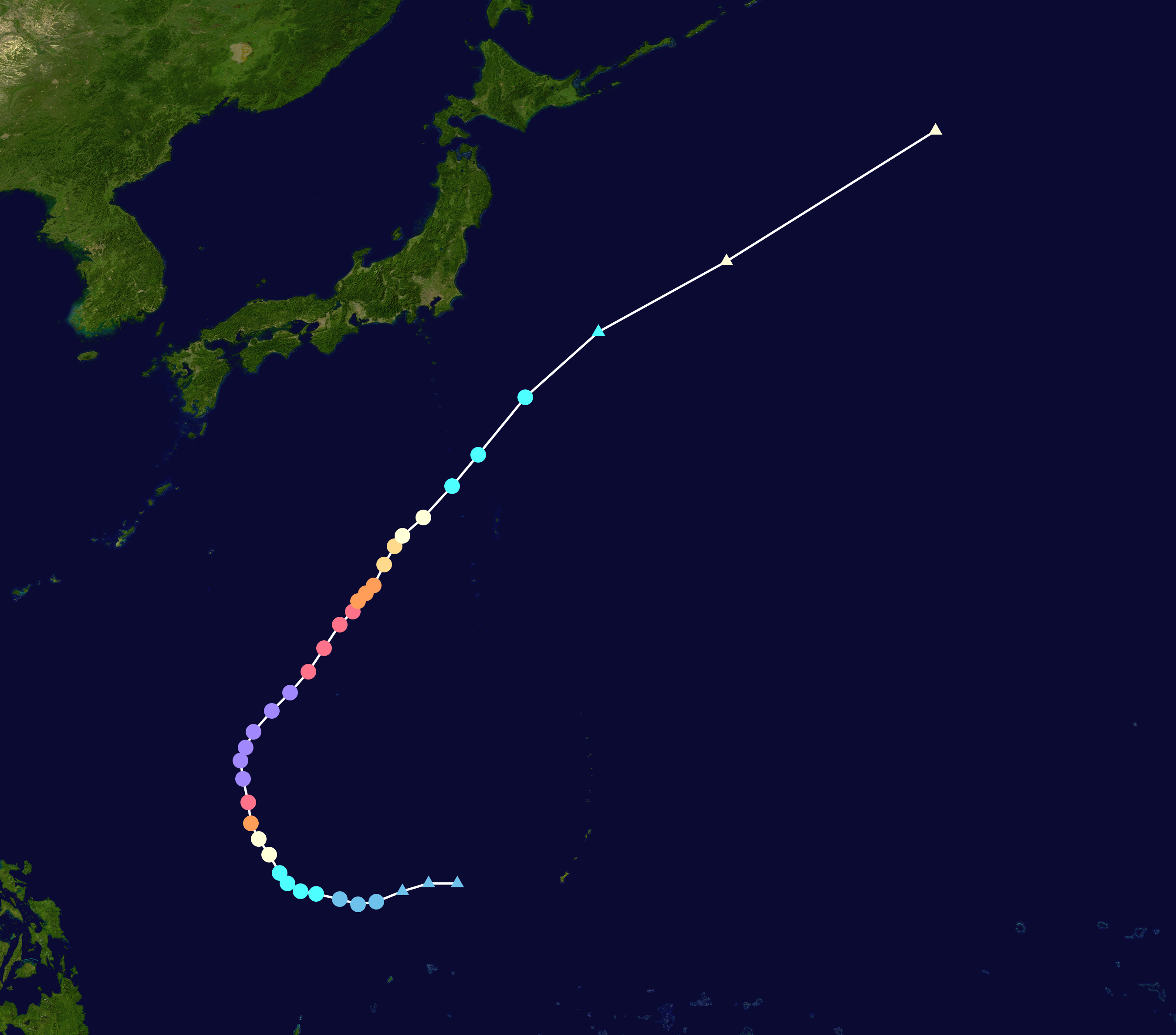
Map plotting the storm's track and intensity, according to the Saffir–Simpson scale Map key Saffir–Simpson scale Tropical depression (≤38 mph, ≤62 km/h) Tropical storm (39–73 mph, 63–118 km/h) Category 1 (74–95 mph, 119–153 km/h) Category 2 (96–110 mph, 154–177 km/h) Category 3 (111–129 mph, 178–208 km/h) Category 4 (130–156 mph, 209–251 km/h) Category 5 (≥157 mph, ≥252 km/h) Unknown Storm type Tropical cyclone Subtropical cyclone Extratropical cyclone, remnant low, tropical disturbance, or monsoon depression

A low-pressure area formed approximately 590 km (370 mi) east-southeast of Guam early on October 28, and the low developed into a tropical disturbance on the next day. After having slowly consolidated for two days, the Joint Typhoon Warning Center (JTWC) issued a Tropical Cyclone Formation Alert to the system on October 30, due to its quickly consolidating but broad low-level circulation center (LLCC) under a favorable environment. Additionally, the Japan Meteorological Agency (JMA) upgraded the low-pressure area to a tropical depression at noon on the same day. The agency upgraded the system to a tropical storm and named it Nuri early on October 31, shortly after the JTWC upgraded it to a tropical depression and designated it as 20W. Under low vertical wind shear and good outflow, a central dense overcast (CDO) started to flare over the LLCC with the tighter wrapped banding, prompting the JTWC upgrading Nuri to a tropical storm in the afternoon. As it entered the Philippine Area of Responsibility, the PAGASA named it Paeng at 23:00 PST (15:00 UTC).

On November 1, Nuri was upgraded to a severe tropical storm at 00:00 UTC and a typhoon at noon by the JMA, when the system was turning northward and forming a microwave eye beneath the compact CDO. Late on the same day, Nuri began to form an eye, and the JTWC upgraded it to a typhoon. The system underwent rapid deepening on November 2, depicting a highly round and sharply-outlined 15 nautical miles (28 km; 17 mi) eye embedded in a symmetric CDO of super-deep convection. It also developed its own mesoscale anticyclone that, in combination with the synoptic scale poleward and equatorward outflow, was providing an extremely efficient ventilation to the associated convection. Thus, the JMA reported that Nuri had reached peak intensity late on that day, with ten-minute maximum sustained winds at 205 km/h (127 mph) and atmosphere pressure at 910 hPa (26.87 inHg), when it was located about 520 km (320 mi) southwest of Okinotorishima. The JTWC upgraded Nuri to a super typhoon at the same time, and the warning center even indicated that its one-minute maximum sustained winds had reached 285 km/h (177 mph) six hours later, unofficially recognizing it the strongest tropical cyclone in 2014, tied with Typhoon Vongfong and Typhoon Hagupit in terms of wind speed.

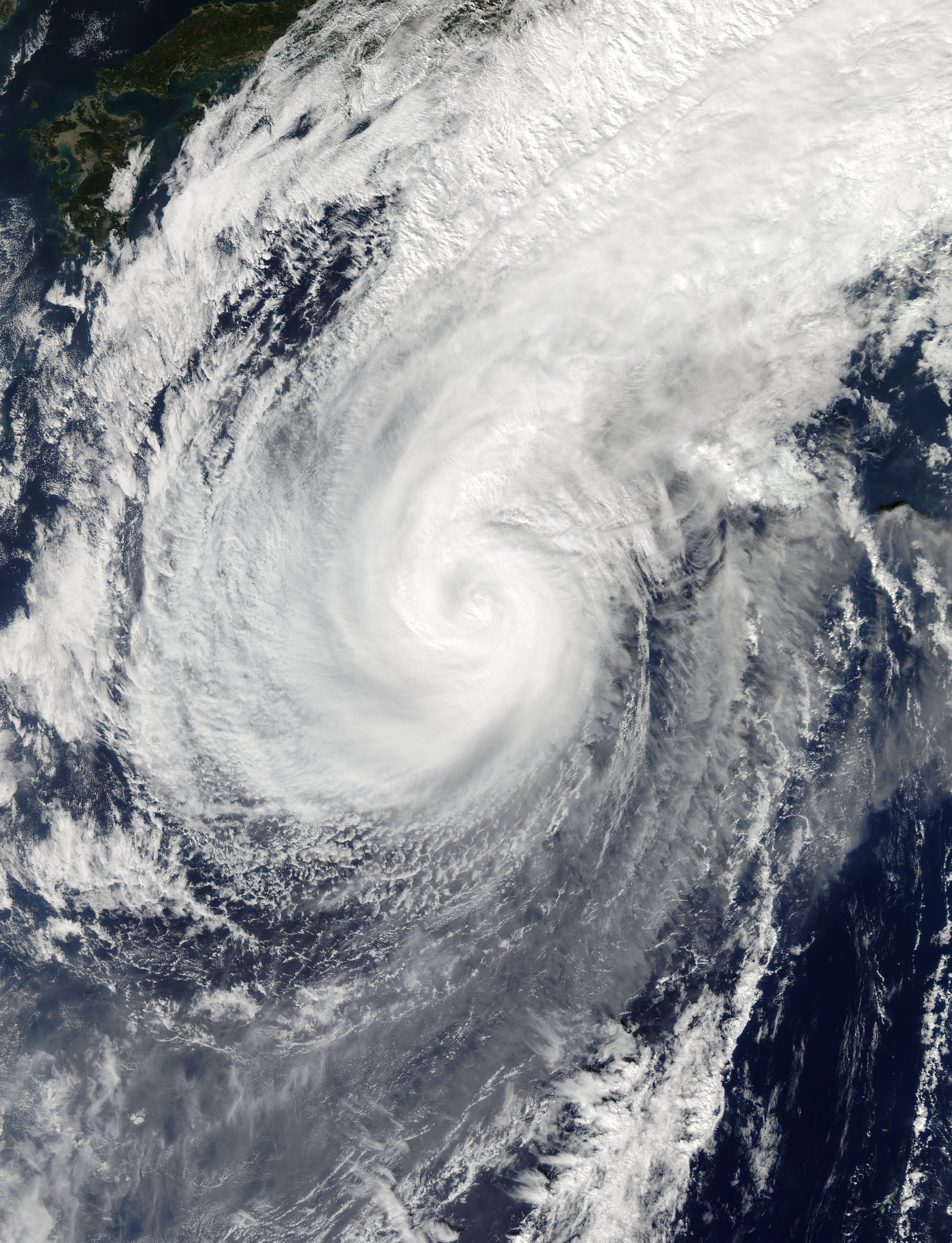
Typhoon Nuri approaching the Ogasawara Islands on November 5

Initially, the JTWC forecast that Nuri would become a record-breaker as strong as Typhoon Haiyan; however, it failed to intensify further. The system retained its impressive structure and turned northeastward along the western periphery of a subtropical ridge to the east on November 3, yet the JTWC indicated that it had begun to gradually weaken owing to warming cloud top temperatures in the afternoon. Early on November 4, the JMA reported that Nuri had started to weaken, and the JTWC downgraded the system to a typhoon. Although vigorous pole-ward outflow into a jet stream located to the northeast of the system offset increasing westerly moderate vertical wind shear, it continued undergoing an eyewall replacement cycle, resulting a cloud-filled eye before noon. Nuri still retained tightly curved banding wrapping into a well-defined LLCC; however, on November 5, the LLCC began to unravel as the deep convection had become isolated to the northern semi-circle, although a weak microwave eye feature remained present. Vigorous poleward outflow into the mid-latitude westerlies became only partially offsetting the increasing vertical wind shear.

Right after the JMA downgraded Nuri to a severe tropical storm at 00:00 UTC on November 6, the JTWC downgraded it to a tropical storm and issued their final warning for the system, due to the extratropical transition and diminishing deep convection. In the afternoon, Nuri accelerated northeastward and became completely extratropical east of Japan. Thanks to the unusually powerful North Pacific jet stream, the extratropical cyclone underwent extremely explosive cyclogenesis on November 7, owing to the energy from differences in air masses. The system split into two centers of low pressure early on the same day, and the former center to the southwest was absorbed into the new center to the northeast within a half a day. The resulting system became the most intense extratropical cyclones observed in the North Pacific Ocean since reliable records began, and indirectly contributed to below-average temperatures in North America.

== Impact ==
=== Japan ===
Yoshihide Suga, the Chief Cabinet Secretary of Japan, said that the government of Tokyo would not allow Chinese coral poaching vessels to come ashore when Typhoon Nuri was approaching the area off the Bonin Islands and the Izu Islands. Many of the vessels that had swarmed off the remote islands began leaving the area in a southeasterly direction on November 5, as the Coast Guard patrol ships warned them to go south to get out of the typhoon's path. However, after Nuri left the area of the Tokyo remote islands, the Chinese coral poaching vessels returned.

== See also ==
- November 2014 Bering Sea cyclone – the system that formed from Nuri's extratropical remnants
- Typhoon Lekima (2013)
- Typhoon Songda (2016)
