= January 2013 Northwest Pacific cyclone =

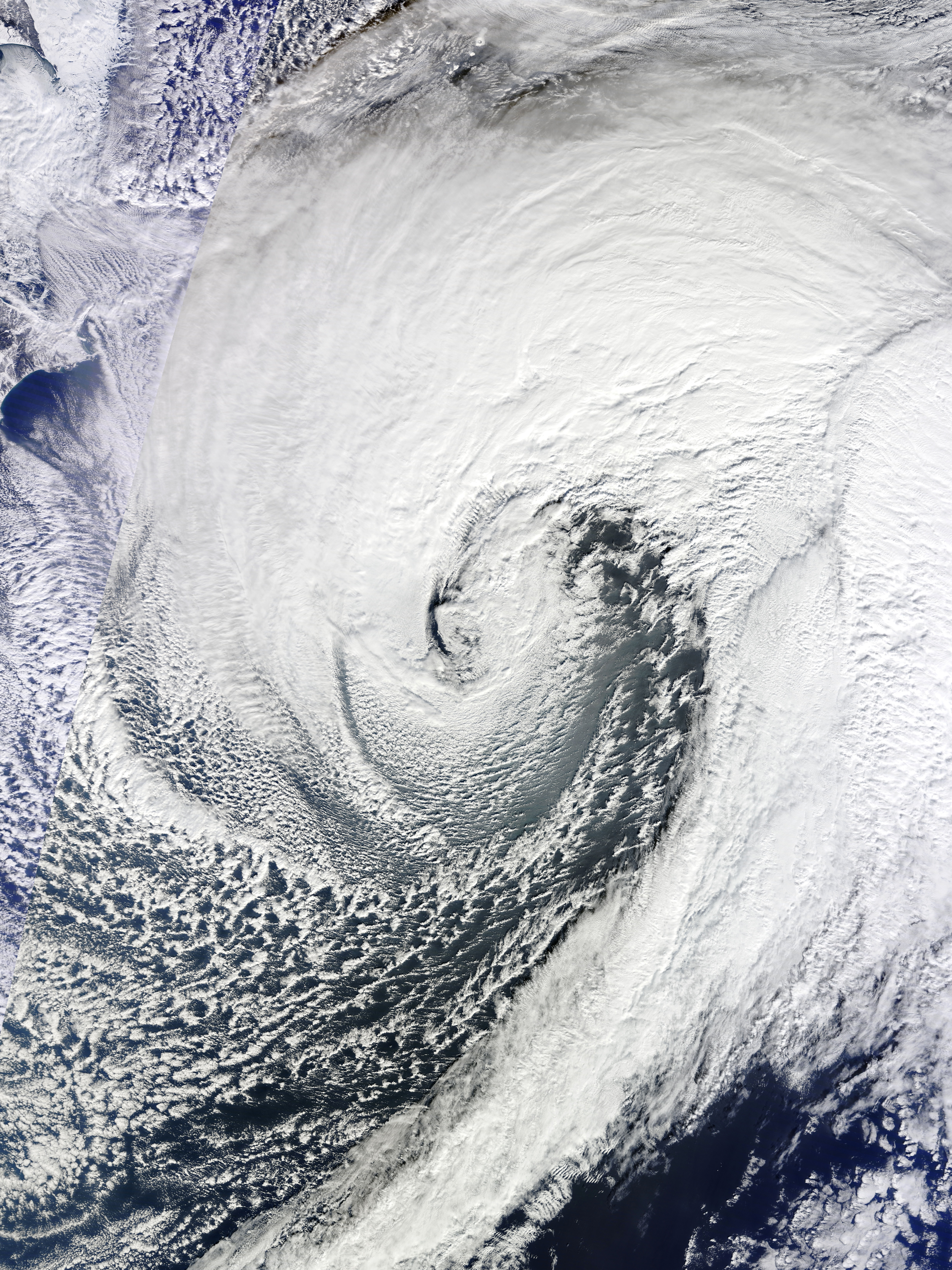
- The bomb cyclone east of Japan on January 15, 2013

Meteorological history
- Formed: January 13, 2013
- Dissipated: January 21, 2013

Extratropical cyclone
- Highest winds: 29.2 m/s (105 km/h) in Chōshi, Japan (10-minute winds 90 mph (140 km/h), 1-minute winds 100 mph (160 km/h))
- Highest gusts: 38.6 m/s (139 km/h) in Miyake-jima, Japan
- Lowest pressure: 936 hPa (mbar); 27.64 inHg

Overall effects
- Fatalities: 1
- Areas affected: Taiwan, Japan, Russian Far East

The January 2013 Northwest Pacific cyclone was a powerful extratropical cyclone which caused heavy rainfall and a severe blizzard in Japan in January 2013. Forming northeast of Taiwan on January 13 and absorbing Tropical Depression Bising soon afterward, the storm quickly intensified in the southern sea off Japan on January 14, and reached its peak intensity east of Japan on January 15, with its central atmospheric pressure decreasing to 936 hPa (27.6 inHg). The system then weakened, crossed the Kamchatka Peninsula late on January 18, and dissipated east of Hokkaido on January 21.

== Meteorological history ==
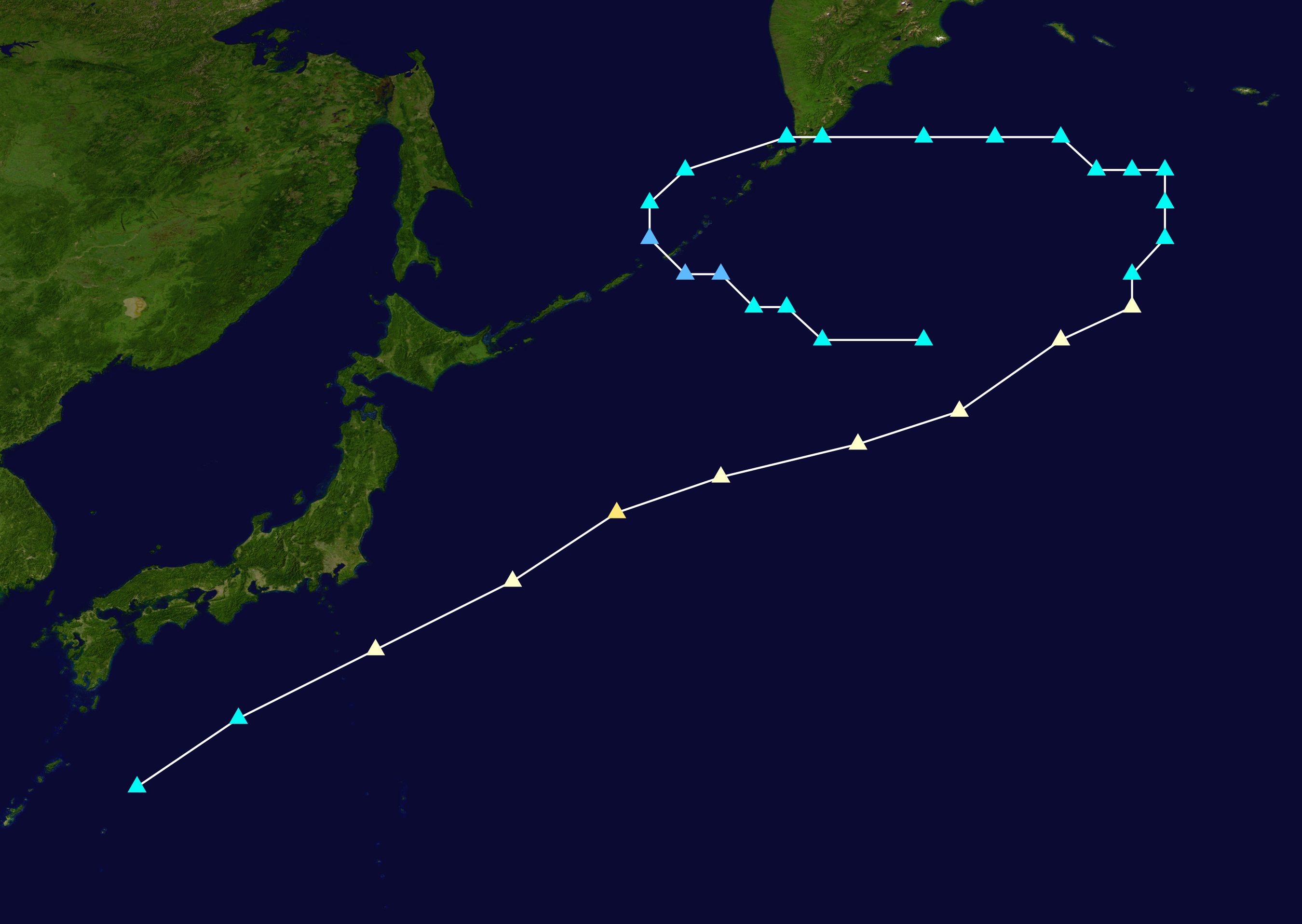
Map plotting the storm's track and intensity, according to the Saffir–Simpson scale Map key Saffir–Simpson scale Tropical depression (≤38 mph, ≤62 km/h) Tropical storm (39–73 mph, 63–118 km/h) Category 1 (74–95 mph, 119–153 km/h) Category 2 (96–110 mph, 154–177 km/h) Category 3 (111–129 mph, 178–208 km/h) Category 4 (130–156 mph, 209–251 km/h) Category 5 (≥157 mph, ≥252 km/h) Unknown Storm type Tropical cyclone Subtropical cyclone Extratropical cyclone, remnant low, tropical disturbance, or monsoon depression

At 0000 UTC on January 13, an extratropical cyclone formed northeast of Taiwan, and the Japan Meteorological Agency (JMA) started to issue storm warnings on the developing low; 18 hours later, the storm southeast of Kyushu absorbed Tropical Depression Bising which formed near the Philippines. Fed by the remnants of the tropical depression's huge amounts of heat and vapor, the storm quickly intensified and became a hurricane-force bomb cyclone when it passed over the sea south of Japan on January 14. Late the same day, the estimated 10-minute maximum sustained winds reached 80 knots (150 km/h) when the storm was east of the Tōhoku region. On January 15, the atmospheric pressure of the powerful extratropical cyclone far east of Hokkaido decreased to 936 hPa (27.6 inHg), which is equivalent to a very strong typhoon.

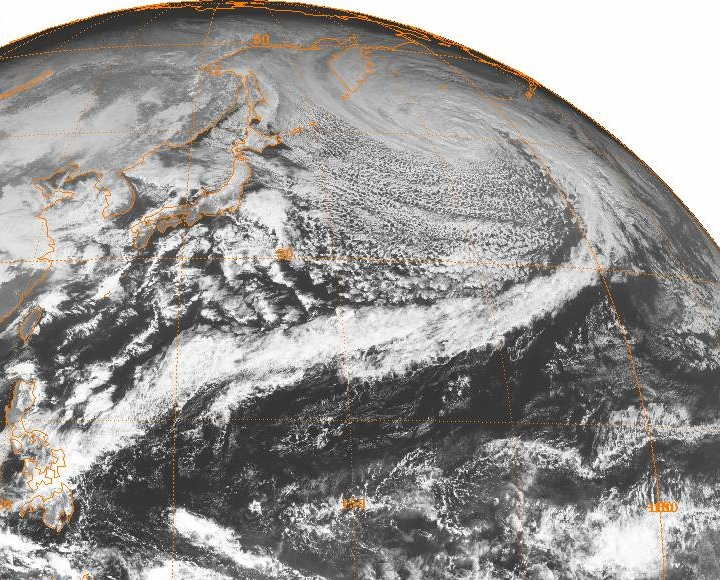
The bomb cyclone on January 16, occupying a half of the northwest Pacific Ocean

At 0000 UTC on January 16, the extratropical cyclone started to weaken, and the storm was no longer producing sustained hurricane-force winds. A half of day later, the estimated 10-minute maximum sustained winds weakened to 50 knots (93 km/h) when the system was located southeast of the Kamchatka Peninsula, whilst the atmospheric pressure also decreased to 948 hPa (28.0 inHg). The storm turned westerly on January 17, and it became gale-force at 00Z on January 18. Late on January 18, the center crossed the southernmost point of the Kamchatka Peninsula and arrived at the Sea of Okhotsk, when the atmospheric pressure was 986 hPa (29.1 inHg). The low turned southwesterly then southerly, and it passed through the Kuril Islands on January 20. The system finally dissipated to the far east of Hokkaido on January 21.

== Impact ==
=== Japan ===
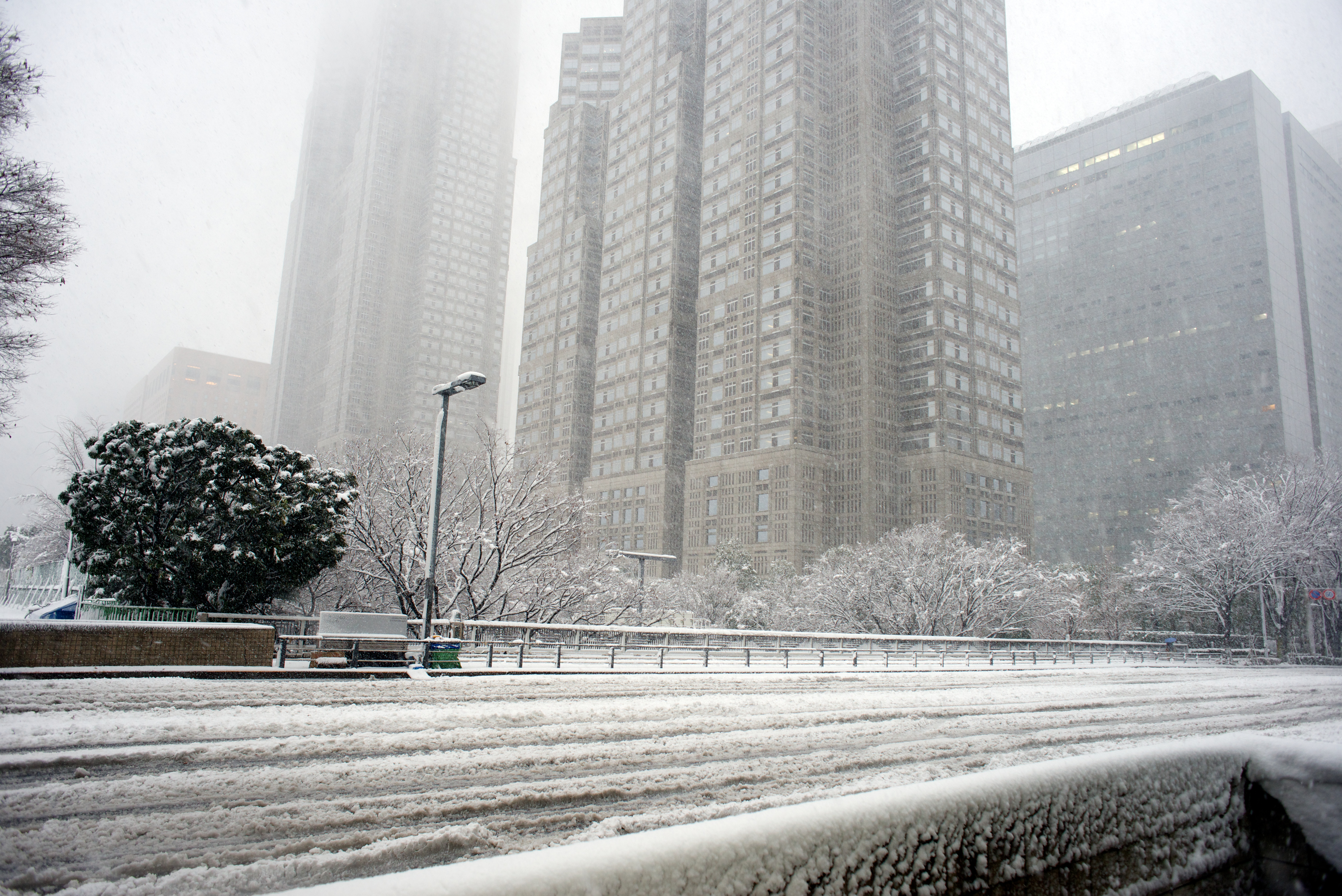
A severe blizzard in Shinjuku, Tokyo on January 14

The powerful extratropical cyclone which passed over the sea south of Japan caused heavy rainfall and snowfall in the country on January 14. In Tokyo, the blizzard dumped 8 cm (3.1 in) of snow in nine hours. It also left 13 cm (5.1 in) of snow in the neighboring city Yokohama and 30 cm (12 in) of snow in mountainous areas around Tokyo.

About 1600 injuries were recorded in Japan. In Shiojiri, a 71-year-old man died after falling into an open drain as he cleared snow around his house. A large chunk of frozen snow fell from the Tokyo Skytree and crashed into the roof of a house below, leaving a 30 cm (12 in) hole.

As January 14 was also Coming of Age Day in 2013, many young Japanese people who were celebrating their 20th year had to walk through heavy snowfall to attend Coming of Age Day ceremonies.

== See also ==
- Explosive cyclogenesis
- Great Gale of 1880
- Columbus Day Storm of 1962
- November 2011 Bering Sea superstorm
- Tropical Depression Bising
- 2013 Pacific typhoon season
- Typhoon Nuri (2014)
