= November 2014 Bering Sea cyclone =

Extratropical cyclone in the Bering Sea

November 2014 Bering Sea cyclone Post-Tropical Cyclone Nuri
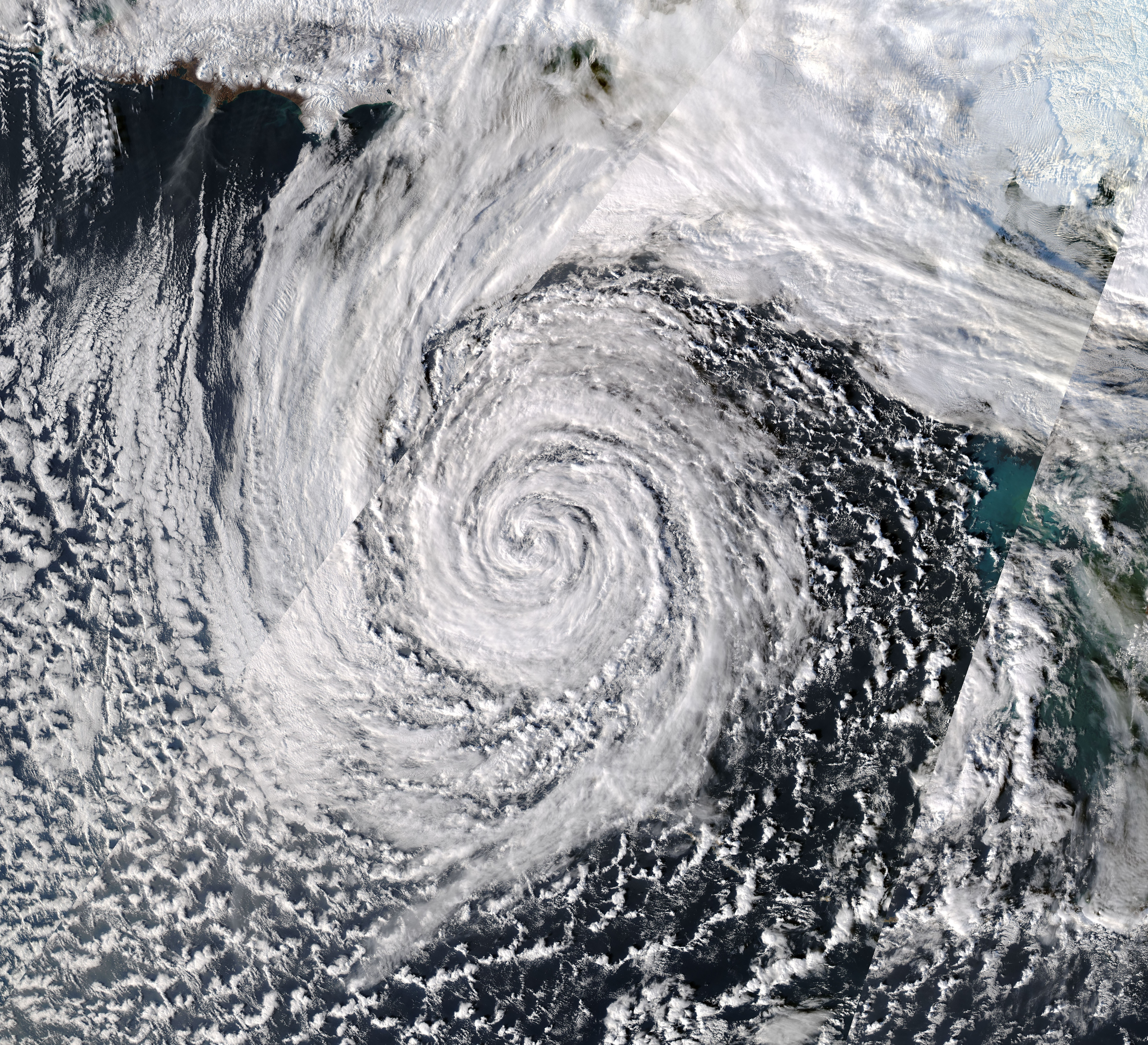
- The bomb cyclone at its peak intensity over the Bering Sea, on November 9, 2014

Meteorological history
- Formed: November 7, 2014
- Dissipated: November 13, 2014

Extratropical cyclone
- Highest winds: 130 km/h (80 mph)
- Highest gusts: 97 mph (156 km/h) at Shemya, Alaska
- Lowest pressure: 920 hPa (mbar); 27.17 inHg (North Pacific extratropical record low)

Overall effects
- Fatalities: None reported
- Damage: Unknown
- Areas affected: Bering Sea, Aleutian Islands, Russian Far East, Alaska, Contiguous United States
- Part of the 2014–15 North American winter

The November 2014 Bering Sea cyclone (also referred to as Post-Tropical Cyclone Nuri by the U.S. government) was the most intense extratropical cyclone (also a bomb cyclone) ever recorded in the Bering Sea, which formed from a new storm developing out of the low-level circulation that separated from Typhoon Nuri, which soon absorbed the latter. The cyclone brought gale-force winds to the western Aleutian Islands and produced even higher gusts in other locations, including a 97 miles per hour (156 km/h) gust in Shemya, Alaska. The storm coincidentally occurred three years after another historic extratropical cyclone impacted an area slightly further to the east.

== Meteorological history ==
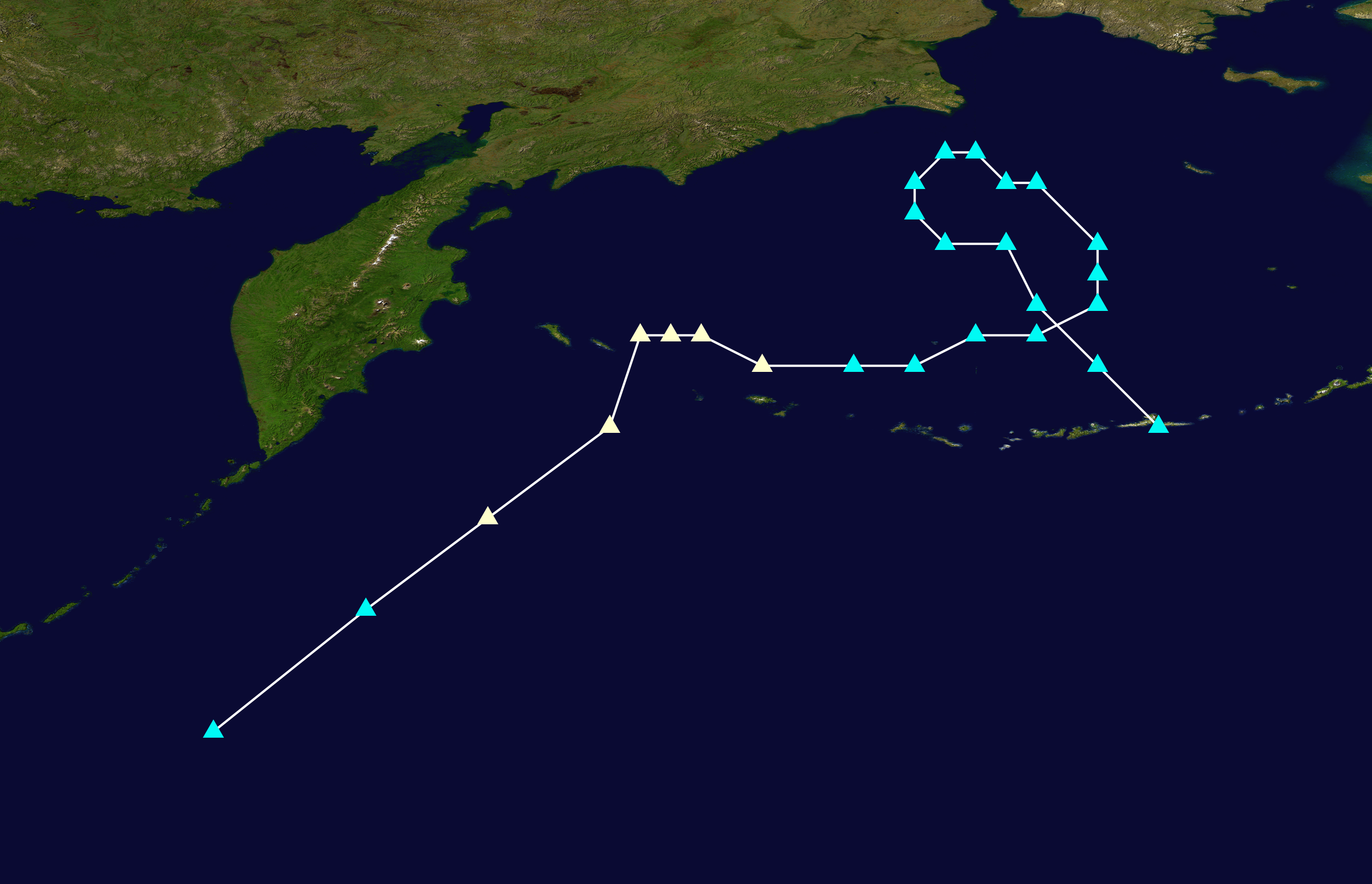
Map plotting the storm's track and intensity, according to the Saffir–Simpson scale Map key Saffir–Simpson scale Tropical depression (≤38 mph, ≤62 km/h) Tropical storm (39–73 mph, 63–118 km/h) Category 1 (74–95 mph, 119–153 km/h) Category 2 (96–110 mph, 154–177 km/h) Category 3 (111–129 mph, 178–208 km/h) Category 4 (130–156 mph, 209–251 km/h) Category 5 (≥157 mph, ≥252 km/h) Unknown Storm type Tropical cyclone Subtropical cyclone Extratropical cyclone, remnant low, tropical disturbance, or monsoon depression

Right after the JMA downgraded Nuri to a severe tropical storm at 00:00 UTC on November 6, the JTWC downgraded it to a tropical storm and issued its final warning for the system, due to Nuri's extratropical transition and diminishing deep convection. In the afternoon, Nuri accelerated northeastward and became completely extratropical east of Japan. Due to an unusually powerful North Pacific jet stream, the extratropical cyclone underwent extremely explosive cyclogenesis on November 7, owing to the energy from differences in air masses. The system split into two centers early on the same day, but the former center on the southwest was absorbed into the new center on the northeast, within half of a day.

Satellite loop of the extratropical cyclone nearing its peak intensity over the Bering Sea, on November 8

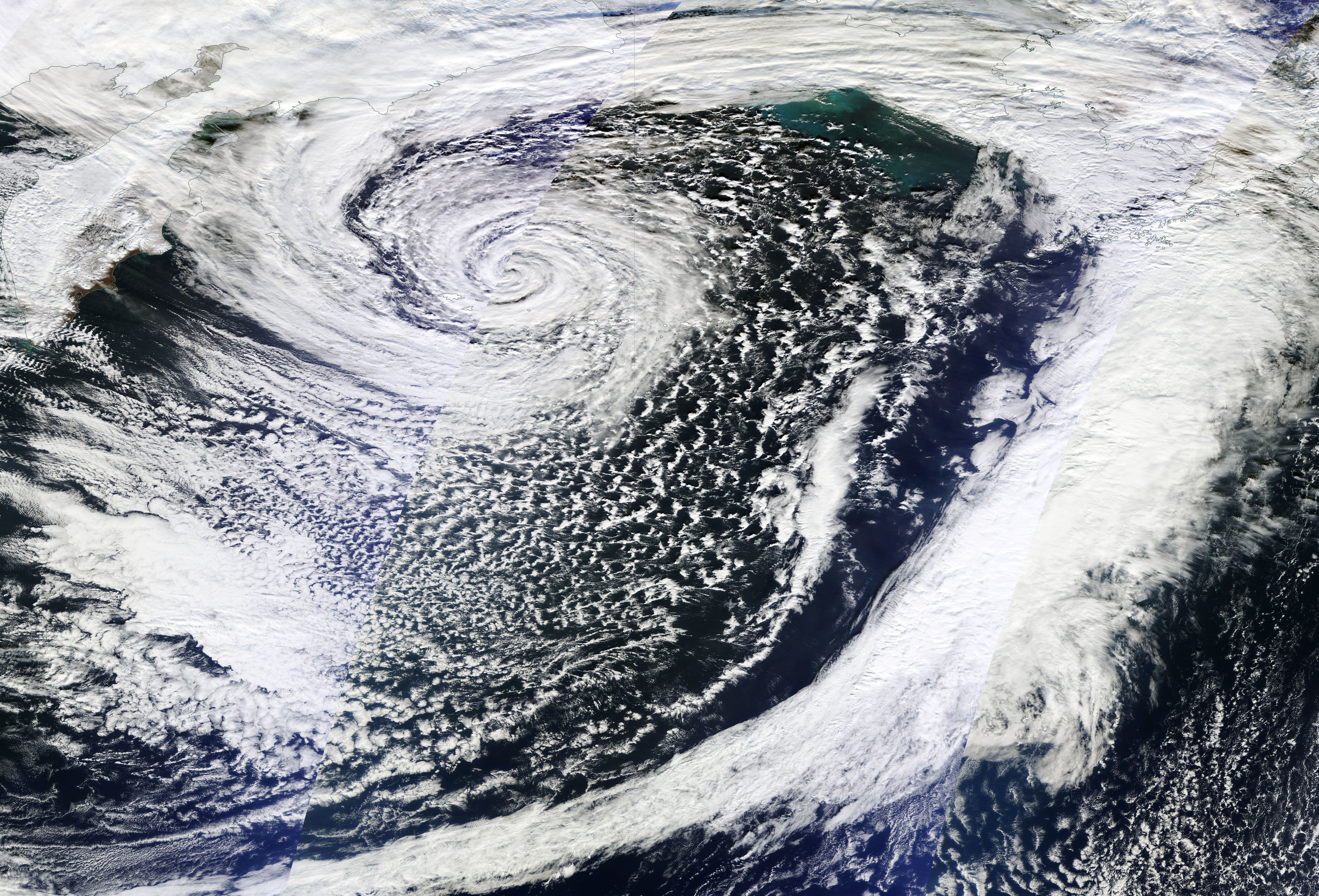
Full view of the extratropical cyclone at its peak intensity, on November 8

After attaining hurricane-force winds at 70 knots (130 km/h; 80 mph), the new storm's central pressure decreased to 920 hPa (mbar; 27.17 inHg) early on November 8, becoming the most intense extratropical cyclone of the North Pacific Ocean since reliable records began. The U.S. National Oceanic and Atmospheric Administration provided a slightly higher estimate of 924 mbar (hPa; 27.29 inHg), a pressure which still holds the record for most intense cyclone in the Bering Sea. The extratropical cyclone crossed the International Date Line on November 9, at which time it started to weaken. However, the system's intensity shifted the jet stream far to the north of Alaska, resulting in a large mass of Arctic air invading the United States along and east of the Rocky Mountains, which caused the worst cold wave the United States had experienced since the Early 2014 North American cold wave. Early on the next day, the storm weakened further into a gale-force system and turned northward. On November 11, it turned northwestward, crossed the International Date Line for the second time, and weakened even further. Afterwards, the system made a counter-clockwise loop and crossed the International Date Line for the third time, late on November 12. The system eventually dissipated near the Aleutian Islands on November 13.

== Impact ==
=== North America ===
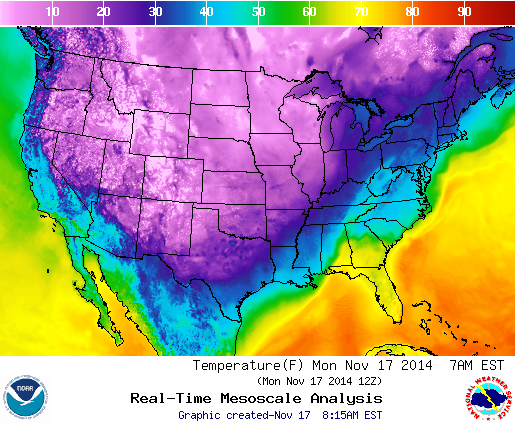
A map of the extremely frigid temperatures in North America on November 17, 2014, caused by the cold wave brought about by Nuri's remnant

Sustained winds of 110 km/h (70 mph) with gusts to 156 km/h (97 mph) were recorded on the island of Shemya. Only minor damage was reported on the island which houses a United States Air Force installation.

The northward movement of the cyclone altered the jet stream, which allowed a fragment of the polar vortex to descend from the Arctic region into lower Canada and the Eastern United States, affecting up to 200 million people with colder-than-normal temperatures and early snowstorms. Some U.S. locations had temperatures 45 °F (25 °C) below normal. On November 10, St. Cloud, Minnesota had the biggest snowfall ever in November with 13.2 inches (34 cm). By the next day, Ishpeming, Michigan had 24.5 inches (62 cm), the most of any location. On November 13, Casper, Wyoming had its lowest temperature ever recorded in November, with a record low of −27 °F (−33 °C), and Denver, Colorado had a low of −14 °F (−26 °C), the second coldest temperature ever recorded for that month.

== See also ==
- Weather of 2014
- Explosive cyclogenesis
- Great Gale of 1880
- Columbus Day Storm of 1962
- Braer Storm of January 1993
- January 2008 North American storm complex
- October 2009 North American storm complex
- November 2011 Bering Sea cyclone
- Great Arctic Cyclone of 2012
- January 2013 Northwest Pacific bomb cyclone
- December 2014 North American storm complex
