= January 31 – February 2, 2015 North American blizzard =

Weather event in the United States

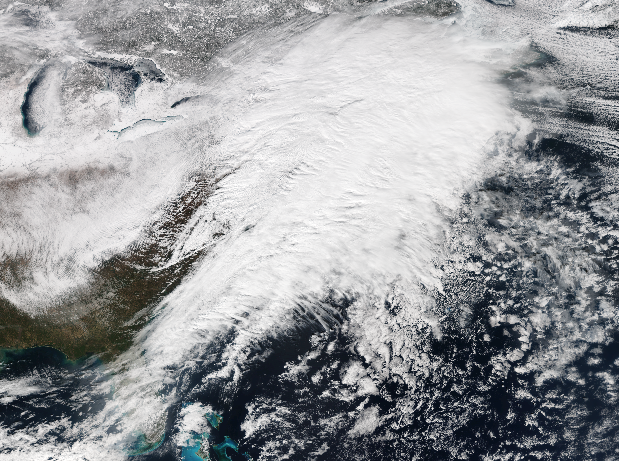
- Satellite image of the large winter storm moving off the East Coast early on February 2. Snow from the system can be seen on the left.

Meteorological history
- Formed: January 29, 2015
- Exited land: February 2, 2015
- Dissipated: February 3, 2015

Category 3 "Major" blizzard
- Regional snowfall index: 8.40 (NOAA)
- Lowest pressure: 978 mbar (hPa); 28.88 inHg
- Max. snowfall: Snow – 24.1 inches (61 cm) in Lunenburg, Massachusetts; Ice – 0.32 inches (8.1 mm) in North Bergen, New Jersey

Overall effects
- Fatalities: 15 total
- Damage: Unknown
- Areas affected: High Plains, Ohio Valley, Central United States, New England
- Part of the 2014–15 North American winter

The January 31 – February 2, 2015 North American blizzard was a major winter storm that plowed through the majority of the United States, dumping as much as 2 feet (24 in) of new snowfall across a path from Iowa to New England, as well as blizzard conditions in early February 2015. It came less than a week after another crippling blizzard which impacted the Northeast with 2–3 feet of snow. It was the first of many intense winter storms to occur in the nation during the month of February, partly in due to an ongoing cold wave that was beginning to take shape shortly after the storm subsided.

Ahead of the storm, residents mainly in the Midwest prepared for potential whiteout or even blizzard conditions. The storm dropped as much as 19 inches (48 cm) in the city of Chicago, Illinois, making it their fifth heaviest snowstorm on record. Up to 15 people were killed by the blizzard, and it knocked out power for hundreds of thousands of people.

== Meteorological history ==
On January 30, an upper-level low moved ashore into California. Pumping some moisture from the Pacific Ocean, it began to produce snow in the high mountainous terrains of New Mexico and Arizona. It began to dive southwards into Mexico late on January 31, and at the same time, a trough dived southwards into the United States. A surface area of low pressure developed as a result of this along an arctic front that was moving through the High Plains. Early on February 1, the winter storm began to move eastwards on a near 1,900-mile long path. Snowfall bands began to set up with rates of up to 2–3 inches (5.1–7.6 cm) per hour and strong winds, leading to blizzard conditions. The cities around the Chicago and Detroit areas were among the locations that got slammed the hardest by the blizzard. As the blizzard continued to move eastwards, winds continued to increase which resulted in higher snow drifts in some locations. The Northeast was its next target. Late on February 1, snow began to spread into parts of New York City and parts of New England. The snow continued to gradually move eastwards until it had reached the southwestern parts of New England overnight. By now the area of low pressure had reached central Pennsylvania, with its warm front passing through New York City. Because of this, snowfall totals had a sharp cutoff of about 20 miles (32 km). Instead, NYC picked up about 4 inches (10 cm) and some freezing rain. As the area of low pressure moved off the coast early on February 2, it began to rapidly intensify, with warm air being thrown into coastal front, and stronger winds which resulted in blizzard conditions, heavier snowfall totals and snowfall rates of about 2–3 inches (5.1–7.6 cm) per hour. As it continued to move to the east, the snow began to gradually taper off as snowbands pulled away, the system continued to intensify before peaking at 978 millibars (28.9 inHg) late on February 3, and dissipating a day later.

== Preparations and impact ==
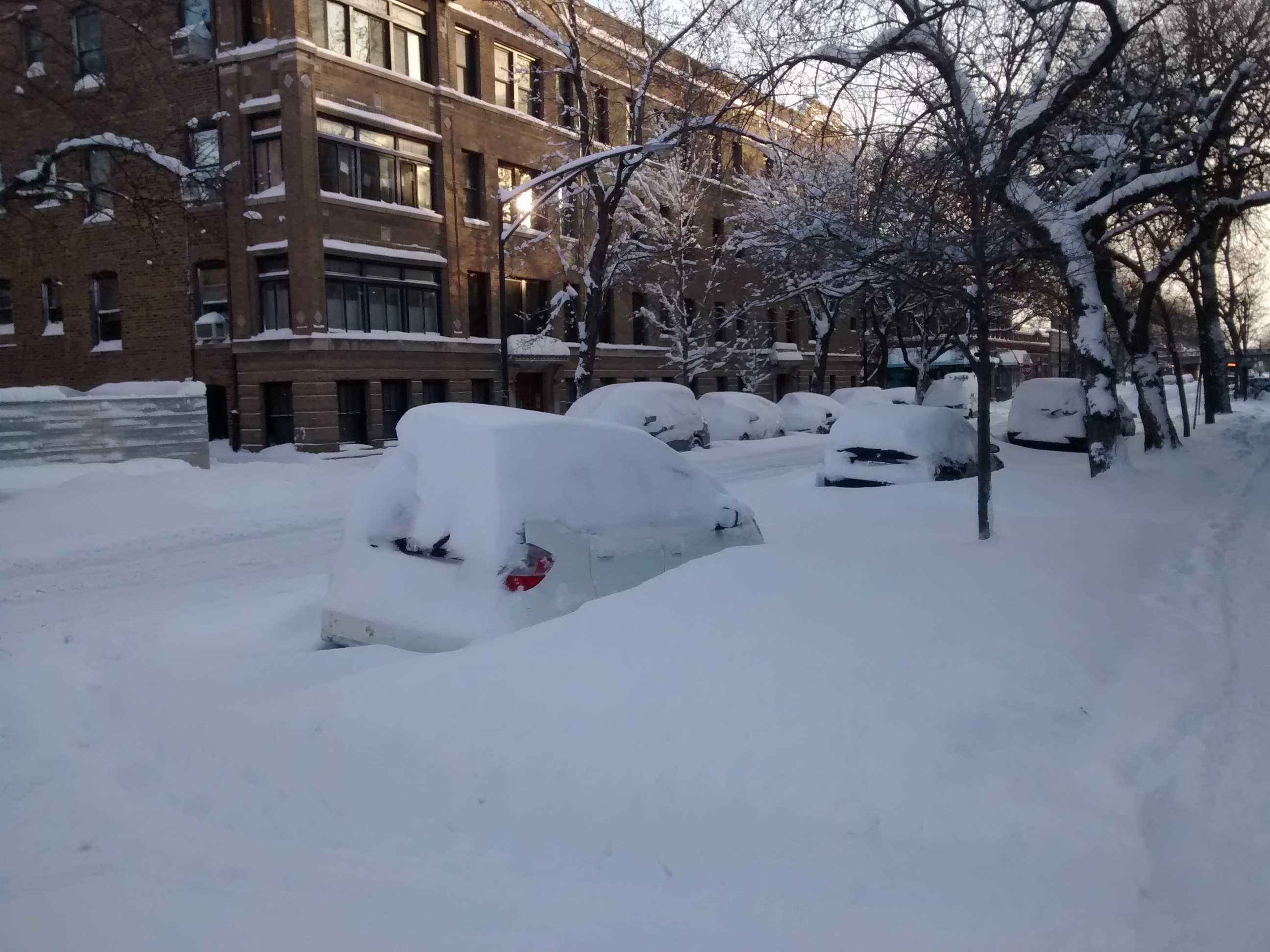
Snow in Chicago

=== Midwest ===
The majority of impacts were felt in the Midwest, especially in and around the areas around Chicago. On February 1, a blizzard warning was issued for the region. Several school closings were announced across most of the Midwest due to predicted snowfall accumulations of more than a foot. Chicago received up to 19.3 inches (49 cm), making it the fifth heaviest snowstorm to strike the city on record. Detroit received 16.7 inches (42 cm), which made this the third heaviest snowstorm in the city.

The same day, Springfield Governor Rauner activated the State Incident Response Center. The Illinois Department of Transportation announced that they would have approximately 1,700 snow trucks ready to plow snowfall on roadways and 3,700 employees on standby for help. Many deaths occurred.

=== Northeast ===
The Northeastern United States experienced the storm on February 2. In New York City, the 7 train was completely shut down for hours due to ice on the train near Queensboro Plaza. In addition, Interstate 95 was shut down near the intersection with Interstate 287. Two fatalities occurred due to the storm in New York, due to the crash which resulted in the highway closure. Another fatality occurred in Massachusetts. The heavy snow resulted in the New England Patriots delaying their Super Bowl XLIX victory parade by a day.

=== Southern Ontario ===
15–37 centimetres (5.9–14.6 in) of snow were reported across Southern Ontario. Many schools were closed across the region. In Toronto, more than 200 flights were cancelled or delayed at Toronto Pearson International Airport, and dozens more at Billy Bishop Airport.

== Snowfall reports ==
This is a list of the largest snowfall reports by state impacted by the storm.

Maine

- 22 inches (56 cm) near Ellsworth

New Hampshire

- 17 inches (43 cm) near Bow

Vermont

- 19 inches (48 cm) in Woodford

Massachusetts

- 24.1 inches (61 cm) in Lunenburg

Rhode Island

- 13.1 inches (33 cm) in West Glocester

Connecticut

- 14.3 inches (36 cm) in Weston

New York

- 19.5 inches (50 cm) in Webster

New Jersey

- 12 inches (30 cm) in West Milford

Pennsylvania

- 13 inches (33 cm) in Cranesville

Maryland

- 4 inches (10 cm) in Oakland

Ohio

- 15.5 inches (39 cm) near Waterville

Michigan

- 20 inches (51 cm) in Kalamazoo

Ontario

- 37 centimetres (15 in) in Windsor

Indiana

- 19.6 inches (50 cm) near Plymouth

Wisconsin

- 14 inches (36 cm) near Pleasant Prairie

Illinois

- 22 inches (56 cm) near Lincolnshire

Iowa

- 14.2 inches (36 cm) near Polk City

Missouri

- 11 inches (28 cm) near Hurdland

Minnesota

- 5 inches (13 cm) in Albert Lea

Nebraska

- 10 inches (25 cm) in Pender

South Dakota

- 8 inches (20 cm) in Yankton

Kansas

- 10 inches (25 cm) in Corning

Colorado

- 8.2 inches (21 cm) near Louisville

New Mexico

- 15 inches (38 cm) near Los Alamos

Utah

- 6 inches (15 cm) in East Willow Creek

== See also ==
- February 2016 North American winter storm
- December 17–22, 2012 North American blizzard
- January 31 – February 2, 2011 North American blizzard
- January 31 – February 3, 2021 nor'easter
