= February 2015 Southeastern United States winter storm =

Weather event in the United States

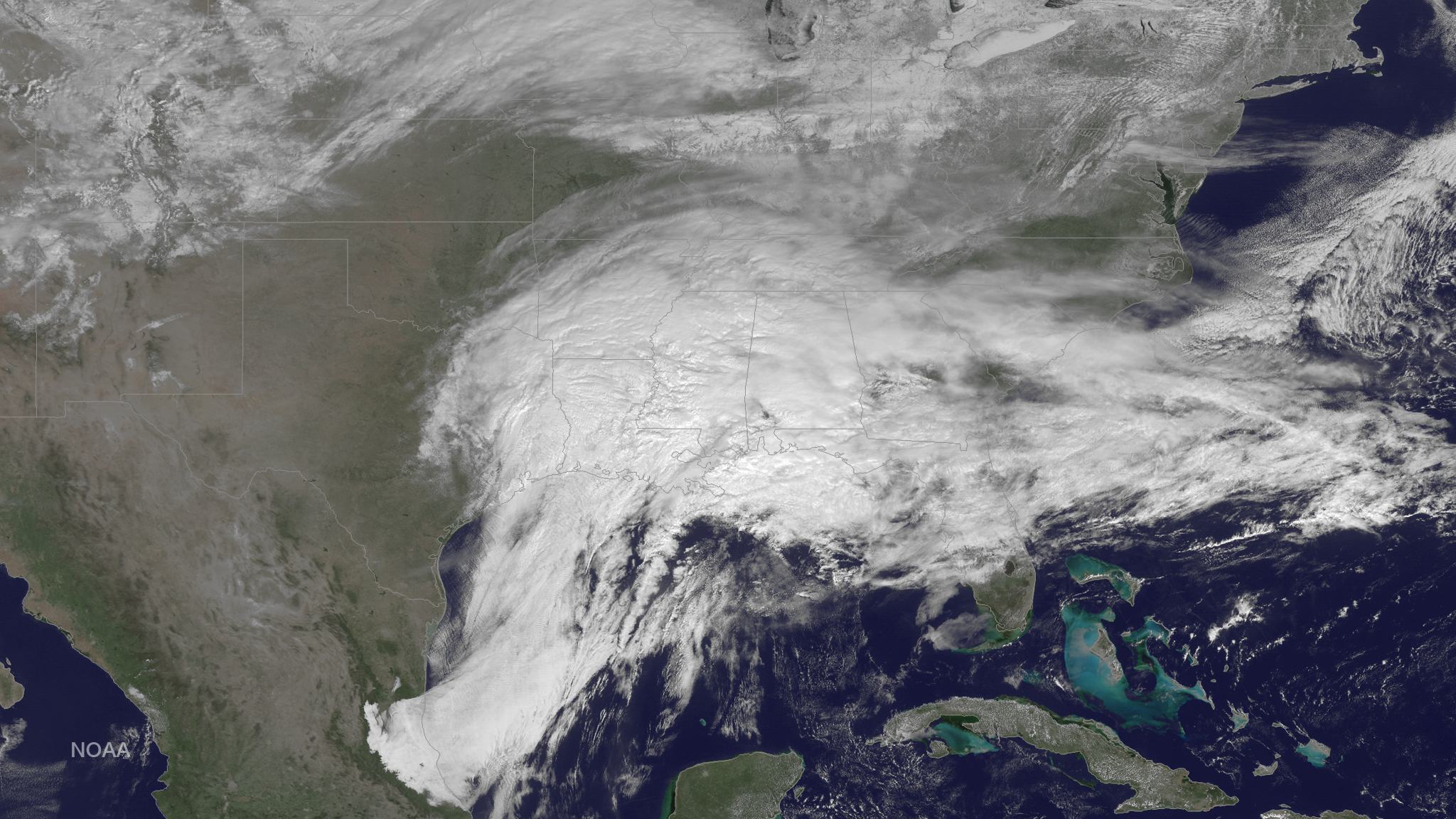
- The extratropical cyclone responsible for the winter storm at 16:45 UTC (11:45 a.m. EST) on February 25 over the Southeastern United States

Meteorological history
- Formed: February 24, 2015
- Exited land: February 26, 2015
- Dissipated: February 27, 2015

Winter storm
- Lowest pressure: 993 hPa (mbar); 29.32 inHg
- Maximum snowfall or ice accretion: Snow – 12.7 inches (32 cm) in Guin, Alabama; Ice – 0.5 inches (13 mm) in Detroit, Alabama

Overall effects
- Fatalities: 4 total
- Damage: Unknown
- Areas affected: Southeastern United States (Texas, Louisiana, Mississippi, Alabama, Tennessee, Georgia), Northeast
- Power outages: 216,000
- Part of the 2014–15 North American winter

The February 2015 Southeastern United States winter storm was a rare winter storm that dumped up to a foot of snow in the Southeast, an area that rarely receives such heavy snowfall. Forming out of a shortwave trough that developed over Texas near the Gulf of Mexico on February 24, the storm quickly made its way over the southern United States, coalescing into a surface low-pressure area as it did so. With arctic air unusually far south, this helped spawn heavy, wet snowfall across the northern portions of several southern states, including the suburbs of Atlanta, Georgia. States such as Alabama and Georgia declared a state of emergency in the northern portions of the state due to the possibility of up to 6 inches (15 cm) of snow, which was normally never seen.

School closures were reported across a wide swath of the south due to treacherous conditions, and four people were confirmed to have died as a result of the winter storm. A very uncommon occurrence, the snow in the southern reaches of the United States was considered extremely rare, mainly due in part of how heavy the total accumulations were; in some areas it was their heaviest snowstorm on record. The storm was the third of five winter storms that made their way across the United States in a period lasting from late February into early March.

The storm was unofficially named Winter Storm Remus by the Weather Channel.

== Meteorological history ==
On February 25, a shortwave trough developed over Texas near the Gulf of Mexico. The disturbance moved at a fast pace, initiating cyclogenesis along a stationary front with a surface low developing shortly afterwards. As it moved eastwards, precipitation began to blossom around the low pressure as low level southerly winds enabled moisture from the Gulf of Mexico to advance near and over the stationary front, spreading a large range of precipitation across the South. Due to very cold temperatures pushing well down into the South as part of an unusually cold winter, snow was able to break out in places that rarely observe snowfall, such as Texas and Louisiana. By 21:00 UTC that day, the Weather Prediction Center (WPC) began issuing storm summary bulletins on the developing winter storm as snowfall fell across a large swath of areas.

The system steadily deepened over the following hours, spreading accumulating snow across the states of Alabama, Georgia and North Carolina, while also triggering a small line of thunderstorms in the state of Florida, prompting a brief tornado watch for that area. At 09:00 UTC on February 26, as a new area of low pressure began developing closer to the coast, the system achieved a minimum pressure of 994 mb (29.4 inHg) just southeast of South Carolina into the Atlantic while snow began ending in the Southeastern states. Meanwhile, accumulating snow began spreading into the Mid-Atlantic states, as the system began moving more to the northeast. By 21:00 UTC later that day, the system had moved far enough offshore and snow ending in enough areas for the WPC to terminate bulletins on the winter storm.

== Preparations and impact ==
=== Deep South ===
Multiple school closures were reported across the state of Louisiana, including the University of Louisiana on February 25. Light freezing rain was reported in Shreveport, causing some glazing on branches and above-ground objects before transitioning to snow later in the day, of which the highest reported was 4 inches (10 cm).

In Mississippi, three deaths were blamed on the storm, two of which were caused by traffic accidents from the winter storm. At least 28,000 power outages were reported across the state, and officials warned residents to not travel as they continued to treat and clear roadways. Shelters had to opened for some people due to the outages causing those to lose heat as well. The city of Tupelo received their second-highest daily snowfall total on record with a total of 7.3 inches (19 cm), just behind a record from January 1940.

The National Weather Service in Alabama issued a local area emergency for at least 10 counties in the northern portion of the state, warning residents not to travel unless it was an emergency. Multiple motorists became stranded on Interstate 65 late on February 25 due to the wintry weather, with the Alabama National Guard being called into assist stranded drivers.

=== Southeast ===
On February 24, in advance of the storm, governor Nathan Deal of Georgia, declared a state of emergency, and announced that all government offices would close the following day at noon. The Georgia Department of Transportation released a statement saying that they would mobilize 13 trucks to apply brine to major highways in the vicinity expected to get snow at midnight. Also, the State Patrol announced that they would deploy 174 state troopers to rapidly response to accidents. In addition, schools and universities closed in preparation for the winter storm. The city of Atlanta closed schools early and universities closed, to avoid a repeat of a disastrous handling during a winter storm in January 2014. City officials were also let out early as well.

As the storm moved into the Carolinas, North Carolina governor Pat McCrory declared a state of emergency on February 25. The state deployed roughly 1,700 equipment crews to treat roadways and residents were urged to not travel at all if weather permitted to be bad. Major power outages were reported across the state, primarily in the central parts, totaling around 230,000 customers, primarily due to branches and power line being weighed down after snow transitioned to sleet and rain. In addition, state troopers helped residents stuck on treacherous roads. In Raleigh, crews responded to around 60 accidents.

In South Carolina, Governor Nikki Haley declared a state of emergency for 31 counties ahead of the storm, and advised people to stay off the roads by 5 p.m. Wednesday before the storm hit. Only roughly 1,000 were reported by the following morning as impacts trended to be lower than expected.

=== Mid-Atlantic ===
In northern Virginia, several schools closed early on February 26 due to accumulating snow, and around 9,000 power outages were reported. As much as 9 inches (23 cm) fell in parts of the state.

== See also ==
- January 2014 Gulf Coast winter storm
- February 2014 nor'easter
- 1993 Storm of the Century
