= December 2014 North American storm complex =

Winter storm

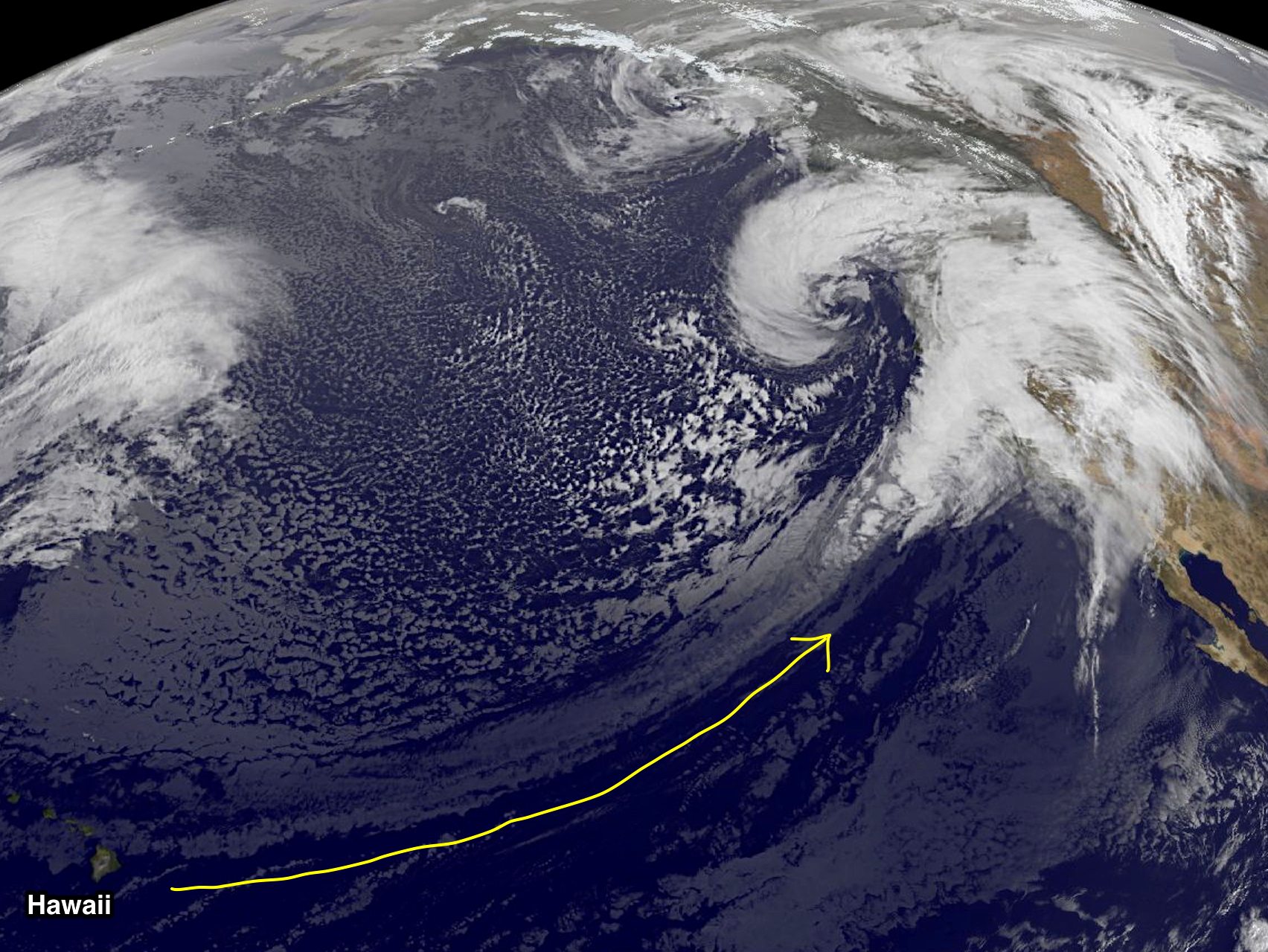
- Satellite image of the system off the coast of California, on December 10, 2014, with the flow of the Pineapple Express marked by the yellow arrow

Meteorological history
- Formed: November 30, 2014
- Dissipated: December 28, 2014

Tornado outbreak
- Tornadoes: 6 confirmed
- Max. rating: EF0 tornado
- Duration: 2 days, 12 hours and 3 minutes
- Highest gusts: 139 mph (224 km/h) (White Mountain Peak)
- Lowest pressure: 960 mbar (28 inHg)
- Max. rainfall: 14.6 in (37 cm) of rainfall (Petrified Forest)

Overall effects
- Fatalities: 2 confirmed
- Areas affected: Southeast Alaska, Western Canada, Contiguous United States, Great Lakes region, Eastern Canada, Southern Greenland, Iceland, United Kingdom, Ireland, Europe, Western Russia
- Part of the 2014–15 North American winter

The December 2014 North American storm complex was a powerful winter storm (referred to by some as California's "Storm of the Decade") that impacted the West Coast of the United States, beginning on the night of December 10, 2014, resulting in snow, wind, and flood watches. Fueled by the Pineapple Express, an atmospheric river originating in the tropical waters of the Pacific Ocean adjacent to the Hawaiian Islands, the storm was the strongest to affect California since January 2010. The system was also the single most intense storm to impact the West Coast, in terms of minimum low pressure, since a powerful winter storm in January 2008. The National Weather Service classified the storm as a significant threat, and issued 15 warnings and advisories, including a Blizzard Warning for the Northern Sierra Nevada (the first issued in California since January 2008).

== Meteorological synopsis ==
Map plotting the storm's track and intensity, according to the Saffir–Simpson scale Map key Saffir–Simpson scale Tropical depression (≤38 mph, ≤62 km/h) Tropical storm (39–73 mph, 63–118 km/h) Category 1 (74–95 mph, 119–153 km/h) Category 2 (96–110 mph, 154–177 km/h) Category 3 (111–129 mph, 178–208 km/h) Category 4 (130–156 mph, 209–251 km/h) Category 5 (≥157 mph, ≥252 km/h) Unknown Storm type Tropical cyclone Subtropical cyclone Extratropical cyclone, remnant low, tropical disturbance, or monsoon depression

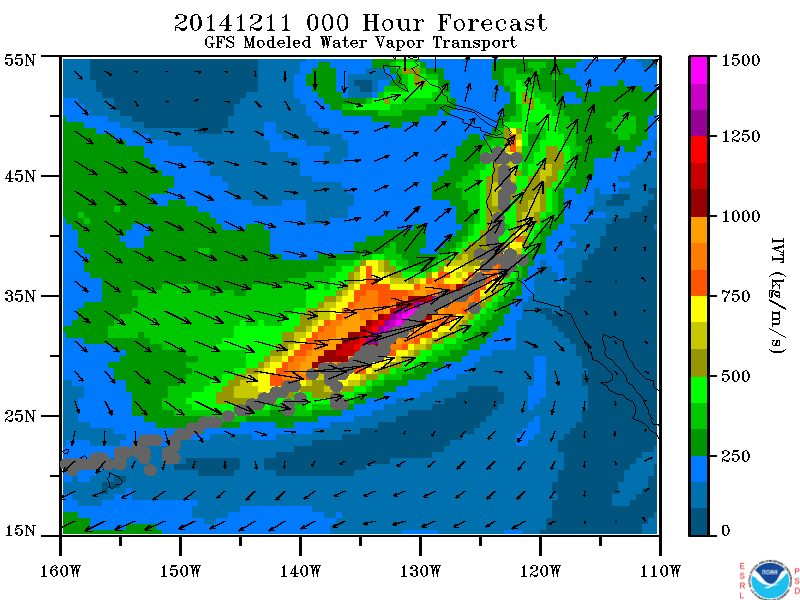
Wind and Vapor imagery based on numerical modeling of the Pineapple Express that fueled the storm, on December 11, 2014

Late on November 30, 2014, a weak extratropical disturbance developed at the southern end of a cold front, to the northwest of Midway Island, near the International Date Line. During the next few days, the system slowly developed a circulation and began to organize, while moving westward, behind a system that was already impacting the West Coast. On December 2, the storm system weakened, as it interacted with a much more powerful Aleutian low over the Gulf of Alaska, which steered the system into the northeast Pacific. On December 3, the system slowly began to restrengthen. On December 4, the system stalled off the West Coast, to the south of Alaska, as a ridge of high pressure built up over the northeast Pacific. During the next several days, the system gradually absorbed other incoming storms and began to rapidly intensify, attaining a minimum low pressure of 963 mbar (28.4 inHg) on December 9. As the high pressure system off the coast of California began to break down, the storm system began bearing down on the West Coast. On December 10, the system began to impact California, even though the system was slowly beginning to weaken. Due to the anticipated flooding and other impacts, many schools across California, particularly in Northern and Central California, were closed in advance of the storm. On December 11, the system moved ashore in British Columbia, but then the storm's center of circulation degenerated, and the system's low pressure center split, with the new low pressure center becoming the dominant low off the coast of Northern California, later on December 11. Several hours later, after moving northward, the low pressure center split into 2 again, when the storm began to move ashore in the West Coast. The massive winter storm dropped large amounts of rain across California, and the system also brought powerful winds to parts of the state. The ensuing downpour triggered flash floods and power outages across the state. After moving inland, on December 12, the dominant low moved eastward across southwestern Canada, before being absorbed by the new low pressure center over Reno, Nevada, although the storm weakened to a 1004 mbar system in the process. On the same day, the system spawned an EF0 tornado 5 miles from downtown Los Angeles, California, which was the first tornado that Los Angeles had experienced in 10 years. On December 13, the system continued moving eastward, and finally left the West Coast region.

On the same day, the storm's circulation split for the second time, with the main circulation heading southeastward over Arizona, as the system continued to weaken. During the next day, the storm's center of circulation moved northeastward over the Southwestern United States, before reaching the Central United States on December 14. On December 15, the storm moved into the Midwest region and began to re-intensify, developing an organized center of circulation to the southwest of the Great Lakes. Late on December 15, the winter storm's outer rainbands began impacting the states in the Eastern United States to the west of the Appalachian Mountains. On December 16, the winter storm's center of circulation reached the Great lakes, and the system began dropping rain and snow in New England. The system also began to produce lake-effect snow in the Great Lakes region, and in parts of New England. On December 17, the system developed a secondary low over New Jersey, at the end of an occluded front, even as the main circulation continued to slowly move eastward. Later on the same day, the system's main circulation briefly stalled just north of New York, while the secondary low continued to develop offshore. That day, rain from the storm in Brooklyn, combined with a poor roof, lead to an NBA game at Barclays Center being delayed 30 minutes to clean up the mess. Late on December 17, the storm system's frontal band exited the New England, even as the secondary low became the dominant low in the system, to the east of Maine. However, the main circulation continued to persist to the east of the Great Lakes, continuing to drop lake-effect snow across New England. On December 18, the secondary low fully absorbed the original low, and the system developed into a well-defined storm off the coast of New England, before moving over Newfoundland. Soon afterwards, the system reached a central low pressure of 990 millibars (29 inHg), after emerging into the Gulf of Saint Lawrence, developing into a nor'easter. Afterwards, the storm slowly began to weaken, as it slowly continued moving northeastward. On December 19, the winter storm left North America, as the system began to accelerate towards the northeast.

On December 20, the system was named Freia by the Free University of Berlin, while the storm system was situated to the south of Greenland. On December 21, Freia underwent explosive intensification and became a bomb cyclone, dropping 30 mbars within 34 hours, attaining a minimum low pressure of 960 millibars (28 inHg). On December 22, Freia weakened to a 970 mbar system, but went on to impact Iceland, as well as parts of Western Europe, before stalling just southeast of Iceland. On December 23, Freia split into three systems, with the main storm weakening into a 980 mbar system to the southeast of Iceland. On December 24, Freia moved slightly to the west and weakened to a 990 mbar system, while the other 2 fragments of the storm continued to accelerate eastward across Norway, Sweden, and Finland. On December 25, Freia weakened to a 1005 mbar storm as it entered the North Sea, and began to approach Denmark. On December 26, Freia moved inland and began to accelerate southeastward, even as the storm weakened to a 1020 mbar system. On December 27, Freia slightly intensified to a 1010 mbar storm as it swept southeastward into the Black Sea. On December 28, Freia was absorbed by another extratropical cyclone to the north.

== Impact ==
=== Damage and casualties ===
A time-lapse animation from NASA's Geostationary Operational Environmental Satellite showing the formation of the storm from December 1–3, 2014 (the small system to the far left of the main storm over California).

On December 10, due to the anticipated impacts, including flooding an blackouts, many schools in California, especially Northern and Central California, were closed in advance of the storm. Winds reached near-hurricane strength, with gusts up to 139 miles per hour (224 km/h) while up to 8 inches (200 mm) of rainfall in 24 hours were expected over Northern California starting on the night of Wednesday December 10, 2014. The massive storm system was also predicted by meteorologists to have somewhat of an effect on all 48 Contiguous states.

The storm claimed two victims in Oregon, killed by falling trees, and left 150,000 households without power across the San Francisco Bay Area. Severe power outages in San Francisco caused Montgomery Street Station (one of the busiest BART stations in the city) to close and produced a major downtime at the Internet Archive. The San Francisco Municipal Transportation Agency announced the entire cancellation of cable cars and ferry services. Public schools remained closed on Thursday, December 11 in San Francisco, Berkeley, Oakland and other school districts in the Bay Area. Authorities at San Francisco International Airport were forced to cancel 236 flights, 40% of the day's total flights cancellations in the United States. In the late morning of December 11, a tree felled by a tremendous gust of wind severely damaged the Social Hall of St Theresa Catholic Church in South Lake Tahoe, CA (El Dorado County).

On the night of Thursday, December 11, the storm continued pounding California, triggering mudslides, floods, and power outages across the state. At least 24 homes in Camarillo Springs were damaged by a rockslide while over 90,000 customers remained without power.

=== Effects on historic drought in California ===
The storm provided only limited, short-term relief for California's worst drought in 1,200 years. Lake Shasta, the state's largest water reservoir, saw an increase in capacity from 25% to 29% on December 11. A similar increase in water level was reported in Lake Oroville. However, experts noted that due to the soil's extreme dryness and low groundwater levels, it would take significantly more rain–at least five more similar storms–to end the drought. During the week of December 15, two more winter storms were expected to move through California during the middle of the week; however, those systems were expected to be "tame" compared to the earlier monster storm. On December 18, an additional third winter storm dropped rain across parts of the West Coast, before being absorbed by a gigantic extratropical cyclone in the Gulf of Alaska, which was forecast to move ashore the Pacific Northwest by December 21. It was also revealed that by December 18, almost all of the Exceptional Drought in Northern California had been reduced to Extreme Drought severity, as a result of the winter storms that brought rain to California during December. After the majority of the moisture from the Pacific Northwest storm moved ashore on December 21 and 22, that storm system was absorbed by another storm on December 24, which promptly moved ashore, which caused some rainfall in California that night and early on Christmas Day. The system moved into the interior United States by Christmas Day on December 25, even as a ridge of high pressure built up off the coast of California. On December 26, the system continued to head eastward across the United States.

== Confirmed tornadoes ==
Confirmed tornadoes by Enhanced Fujita rating
EFU	EF0	EF1	EF2	EF3	EF4	EF5	Total
0	6	0	0	0	0	0	6

On December 12, 2014, a weak EF0 tornado struck southern Los Angeles, the first one to strike in the city in a decade. The tornado damaged at least five homes, and cut the power to over 1,000 homes. After the winter storm moved inland, the system spawned five more EF0 tornadoes across the states of Oklahoma, Kansas, and Mississippi, from December 14-15.

=== December 12 event ===
List of confirmed tornadoes – Friday, December 12, 2014 (Note: All dates are based on the local time zone where the tornado touched down; however, all times are in Coordinated Universal Time for consistency.)
EF#	Location	County / Parish	State	Start Coord.	Time (UTC)	Path length	Max width	Damage (Note: All damage totals are in 2014 USD unless otherwise stated.)	Summary	Refs
EF0	South Los Angeles	Los Angeles	CA	33.9823°N 118.2913°W	1720–1725	0.73 mi (1.17 km)	10 yd (9.1 m)	$0	A weak tornado near the Augustus F. Hawkins High School in the Vermont-Slauson district of South Los Angeles caused roof damage to two homes and an apartment complex, in addition to damaging a steel billboard and downing trees.	

=== December 14 event ===
List of confirmed tornadoes – Sunday, December 14, 2014
EF#	Location	County / Parish	State	Start Coord.	Time (UTC)	Path length	Max width	Damage	Summary	Refs
EF0	SW of Arcadia	Oklahoma	OK	35.62°N 97.38°W	2309–2310	0.17 mi (0.27 km)	50 yd (46 m)	$0	A brief tornado was observed; no damage occurred.	
EF0	NE of Harper	Harper	KS	37.2915°N 98.0097°W	2338–2346	5.98 mi (9.62 km)	100 yd (91 m)	$0	Several trees and tree limbs were downed, and a large hay bale was rolled across a road.	

=== December 15 event ===
List of confirmed tornadoes – Monday, December 15, 2014
EF#	Location	County / Parish	State	Start Coord.	Time (UTC)	Path length	Max width	Damage	Summary	Refs
EF0	SW of Mize	Smith	MS	31.8276°N 89.6172°W	2302–2306	1.53 mi (2.46 km)	50 yd (46 m)	$6,000	Several trees and tree limbs were snapped, and a chicken house sustained roof damage.	
EF0	NNE of Bovina	Warren	MS	32.3668°N 90.7339°W	2356–0000	1.17 mi (1.88 km)	75 yd (69 m)	$12,000	A mobile home was damaged, a site-built home sustained minor roof damage, and a few trees and power lines were downed.	
EF0	ESE of Tylertown	Walthall	MS	31.0936°N 90.0188°W	0518–0523	1.33 mi (2.14 km)	150 yd (140 m)	$0	A barn and several chicken coops were damaged.	

== See also ==
- 2014–15 North American winter
- 2017 California floods
- January 2008 North American storm complex
- October 2009 North American storm complex
- December 2010 North American blizzard
- January 2010 North American winter storms
- Global storm activity of 2010
- November 2014 Bering Sea bomb cyclone
- November 13–21, 2014 North American winter storm
- Tornadoes of 2014
