= February 14–15, 2015 North American blizzard =

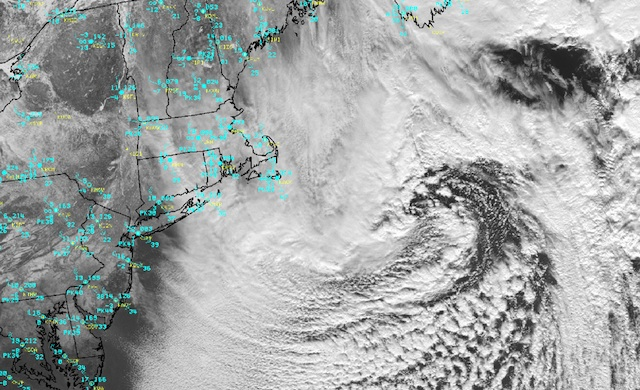
- The winter storm off the New England coast on February 15.

Meteorological history
- Formed: February 12, 2015
- Dissipated: February 17, 2015

Category 1 "Notable" winter storm
- Regional snowfall index: 1.14 (NOAA)
- Lowest pressure: 958 mbar (hPa); 28.29 inHg
- Max. snowfall: 27.4 in (70 cm) in Robbinston, Maine

Overall effects
- Fatalities: 6
- Areas affected: Northeast United States, New England, Canada (partial)
- Power outages: 200,000
- Part of the 2014–15 North American winter

The February 14–15, 2015 North American blizzard was a potent blizzard that occurred in the Northeast United States. The storm dropped up to 25 inches (64 cm) of snow in the regions already hit hard with snow from the past 2 weeks. The storm system also brought some of the coldest temperatures of the winter to the Northeast in its wake. The Blizzard was dubbed Winter Storm Neptune by the Weather Channel.

== Meteorological history ==
The storm developed in a similar fashion to how the previous blizzard originated. On February 14, a clipper system moved off the East Coast and began to intensify rapidly. By midnight, it had gained most of the required criteria to meet blizzard conditions in eastern New England. As the system moved northeast on February 15, a persistent band of heavy snow from the winter storm set up near Boston, resulting in some snowfall rates of 2 inches (51 mm) per hour in the snowband. The system continued to intensify even after the storm had ended, with its pressure dropping to 958 millibars (28.3 inHg) by midnight February 16. The storm was then absorbed by another cyclone on February 17.

== Aftermath and cold wave ==
The associated cold wave brought the coldest air recorded over portions of the eastern Great Lakes in decades on February 15, and possibly over the entire forecast record. Well below normal temperatures covered a large portion of the eastern United States and were expected to stay in place, with only slight moderation, through the rest of the month. Through February 21, primarily on February 16 and February 20, over 600 record low temperatures were recorded in the eastern U.S., including all-time record lows and record lows for February, including the entire state of Kentucky tying the statewide monthly record low. As of February 15, Lake Erie had 94 percent ice cover while Lake Superior and Lake Huron were over 80 percent covered, and Lakes Michigan and Ontario were between 50 and 60 percent iced over.

After the storm, Great Smoky Mountains National Park closed. In addition, Tennessee was forced to upgrade to a Level II emergency. Many state parks in Western North Carolina were also shut down.

== Snowfall reports ==
This is a list of the largest snowfall reports by state impacted by the storm.

Massachusetts

- 22 inches (56 cm) in Acushnet and Ipswich

Maine

- 25.4 inches (65 cm) near Robbinston

Connecticut

- 9 inches (23 cm) in Staffordville

Maryland

- 9 inches (23 cm) in Oakland

Michigan

- 8.5 inches (22 cm) near Zeeland

New Hampshire

- 20 inches (51 cm) near Seabrook

New Jersey

- 7 inches (18 cm) in Red Bank

New York

- 12 inches (30 cm) in Cape Vincent

Ohio

- 8 inches (20 cm) in Shaker Heights

Pennsylvania

- 6 inches (15 cm) in Chandlers Valley

Rhode Island

- 14 inches (36 cm) in Warren

Vermont

- 7.5 inches (19 cm) in Woodford

West Virginia

- 6 inches (15 cm) in Quinwood

== See also ==
- January 2015 North American blizzard
- 2014-15 North American winter
