= Station fire =

Station fire may refer to:

- The Station nightclub fire, a 2003 fire at The Station nightclub in Rhode Island, US
- Station Fire (2009), a wildfire in California, US
