= Bobcat Fire =

2020 wildfire in Southern California

- Part of the 2020 California wildfires
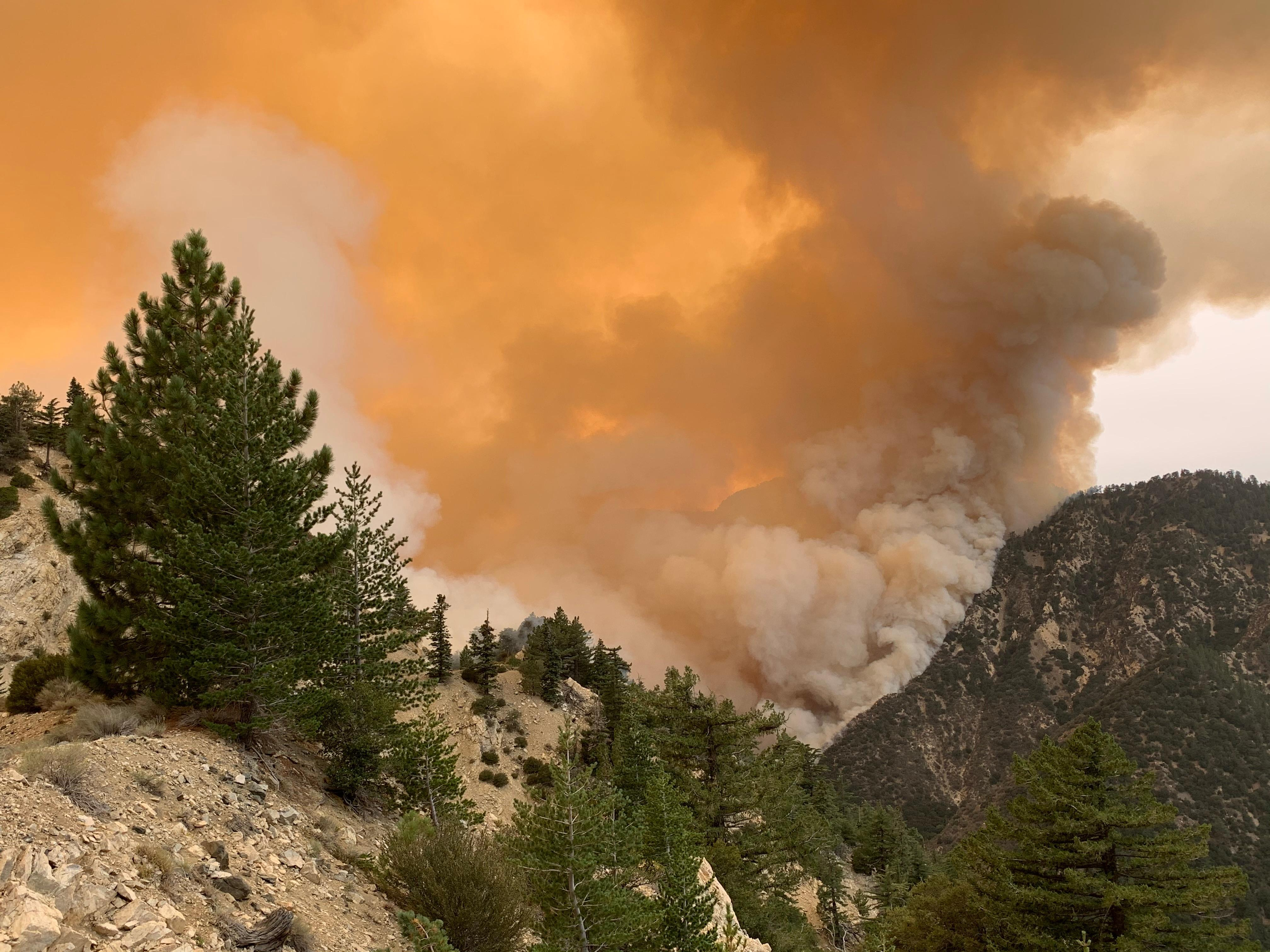
- The Bobcat Fire burning in the Angeles National Forest in September 2020
- Date: September 6 –; November 27, 2020; (83 days)
- Location: Los Angeles County, Southern California, United States
- Coordinates: 34.241°N 117.868°W

Statistics
- Total area: 115,997 acres (46,942 ha; 181 sq mi; 469 km^{2})

Impacts
- Deaths: 0
- Injuries: 6
- Structures destroyed: 169
- Cost: $100 million; (equivalent to about $119 million in 2024)

Ignition
- Cause: Tree contacting power lines

Map
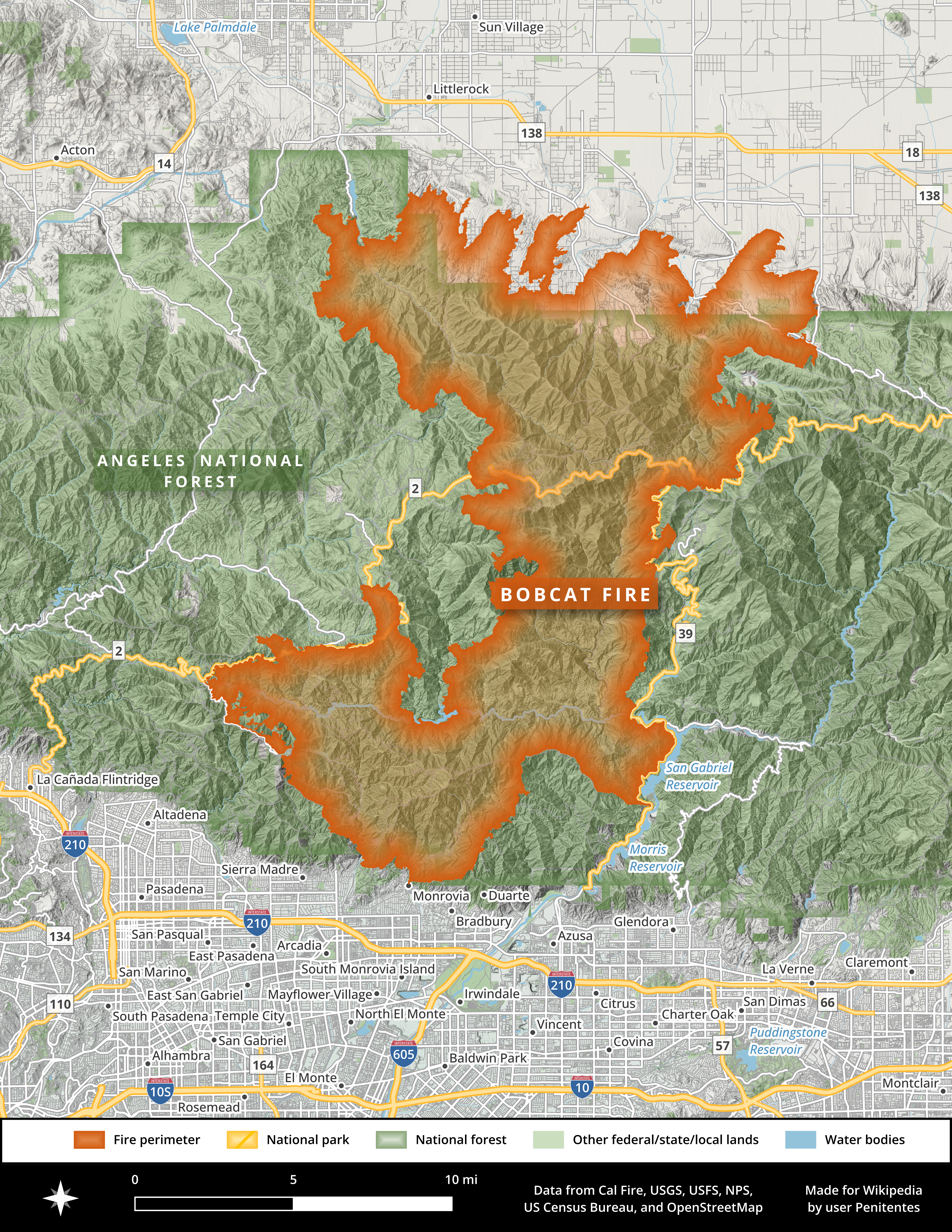
- The extent of the Bobcat Fire

- Location of the Bobcat Fire in Southern California

The Bobcat Fire was a large wildfire in Los Angeles County during the 2020 California wildfire season. The fire ignited on September 6, 2020, and burned 115,997 acres (46,942 ha) before it was fully contained by November 27. The Bobcat Fire primarily burned in the central San Gabriel Mountains, in and around the Angeles National Forest, and is one of the largest fires on record in Los Angeles County to date.

== Background ==
Most of the Bobcat Fire's footprint had no recent burn history, reaching back 50 years before the fire. Some areas had not burned in over 80 years.

Days before the fire began, a heat wave developed in the area. High temperatures surpassed 100 degrees, relative humidity levels fell below 15 percent, and vegetation moistures hovered around critical levels. The National Weather Service in Los Angeles and Oxnard issued a red flag warning beginning 6:00 p.m. on September 6 through 10:00 p.m. the following day. The warning highlighted the potential for large wildfires to spread rapidly upon ignition:

Strong high pressure will bring a dangerous heat wave and low humidities to Southwest California through at least Labor Day. The very hot and unstable conditions will bring a significant threat of large plume dominated fires during this time.

— National Weather Service Los Angeles/Oxnard CA, Fire Weather Message, 10:05 AM PDT Sat Sep 5 2020

Rich Thompson, the fire's incident meteorologist, compared the Bobcat Fire's spread to that of the 2009 Station Fire. He ascribed the growth to "hot and dry conditions, combined with typical summertime terrain-driven winds", as opposed to Santa Ana winds.

== Progression ==
The fire triggered mandatory evacuation orders in parts of Arcadia and Camp Williams.

The fire initially spread southward which prompted evacuation orders for residents in Sierra Madre, Monrovia, Bradbury, and Duarte, along with evacuation warnings for those in Arcadia, Pasadena, and Altadena. The fire then grew westward and threatened the Mount Wilson Observatory by September 15, approaching within 500 feet (152 m) of the observatory as firefighters worked to protect the structure. By September 17, the fire rapidly expanded to the north into Pleasant View Ridge Wilderness due to moderate coastal winds, leading to mandatory evacuations in Antelope Valley as the fire approached Juniper Hills. Containment difficulties were exacerbated by very dry vegetation and rugged topography that made it difficult to access.

The fire was declared fully contained on November 27. The effort to contain the Bobcat Fire cost $100 million, according to the National Interagency Coordination Center.

== Effects ==
The Bobcat Fire destroyed 169 structures and damaged a further 47.

Six firefighters were injured in the course of the suppression effort.

Along with the El Dorado Fire, the fire contributed to hazardous air pollution in the Los Angeles region.

The blaze burned over 180 square miles (460 square kilometers); this made it the second-largest wildfire recorded in modern times in Los Angeles County, behind the 2009 Station Fire but surpassing the 1970 Clampitt Fire. Air quality was poor in the burned areas and in the Los Angeles basin for weeks as a result.

In the San Gabriel Mountains, several types of wildlife and aquatic creatures such as fish, frogs and western pond turtles face extinction as a result of the fires. The area of Little Rock Creek contains much of these aquatic life. Biologists and wildlife organizations were considering rescue operations.

After the fires, some home owners were having trouble finding home insurance as some insurers pulled out of certain zip codes or even certain counties. Most remaining insurers have raised prices. The CA State Department of Insurance banned insurers from cancelling insurance policies or declining renewals for one year after the fires.

== Cause ==
On September 15, 2020, electric utility company Southern California Edison notified the California Public Utilities Commission that its equipment had detected an anomaly on one of its circuits five minutes before the Bobcat Fire was first reported. The utility contended that this was after smoke had first been seen from the fire on cameras. Several weeks later, Southern California Edison filed a supplementary letter, stating that tree branches may have come into contact with the utility's power lines and begun the fire. United States Forest Service investigators took items from the scene into custody, including a section of the conductor line, power poles, and several tree branches. The Forest Service ultimately concluded that a tree had touched the power lines, catching ablaze and starting the Bobcat Fire.

In September 2023, the federal government sued Southern California Edison and Utility Tree Service, a contractor for the utility. The lawsuit accuses the two of not adequately maintaining the tree that came into contact with the powerlines. The federal government is seeking more than $121 million in recompense for the cost of fire suppression and damage.

== Gallery ==
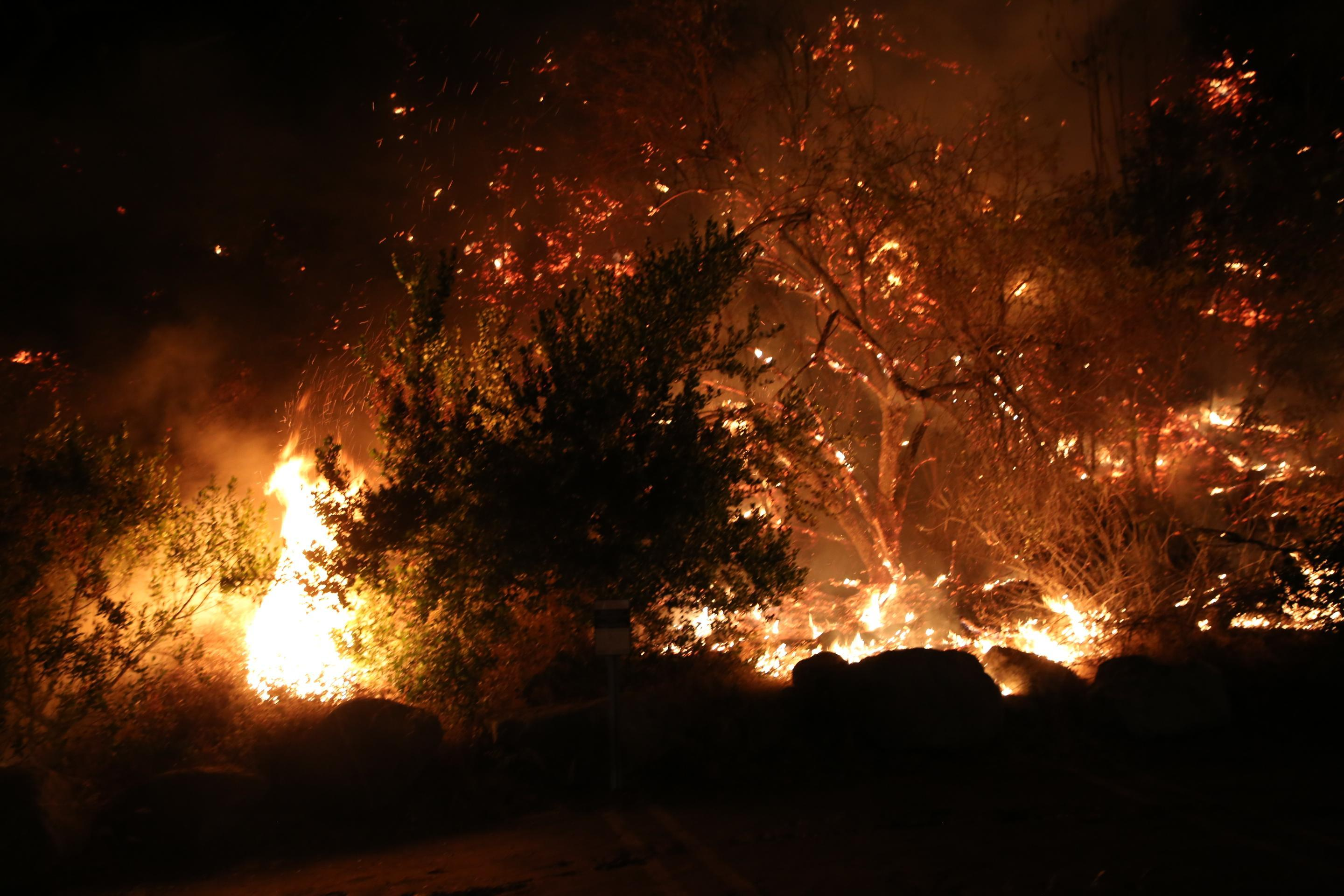
The Bobcat Fire burning at night on Sept 19

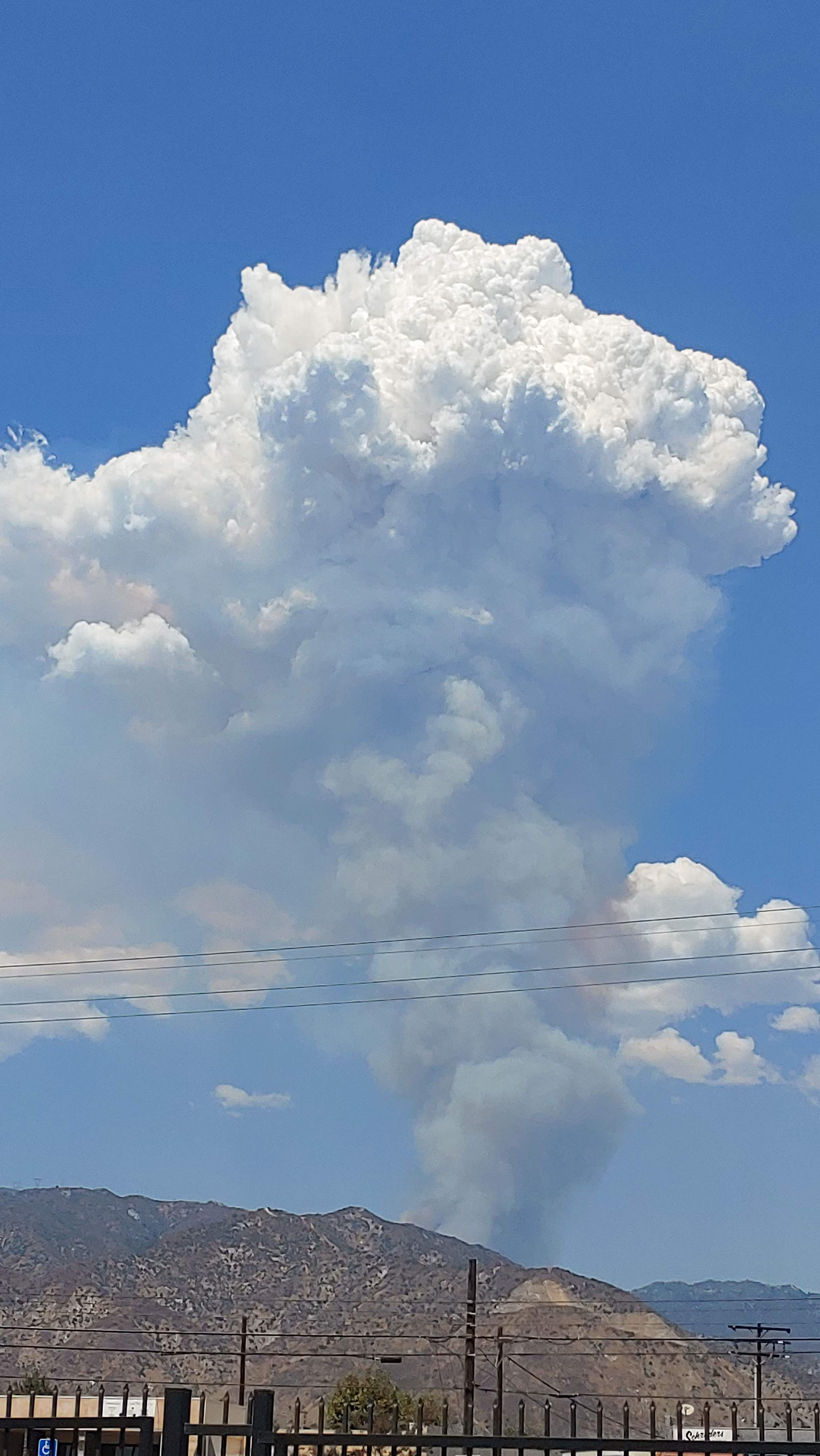
Bobcat Fire 20 minutes after its ignition, above Azusa, CA, Sept. 6, 2020

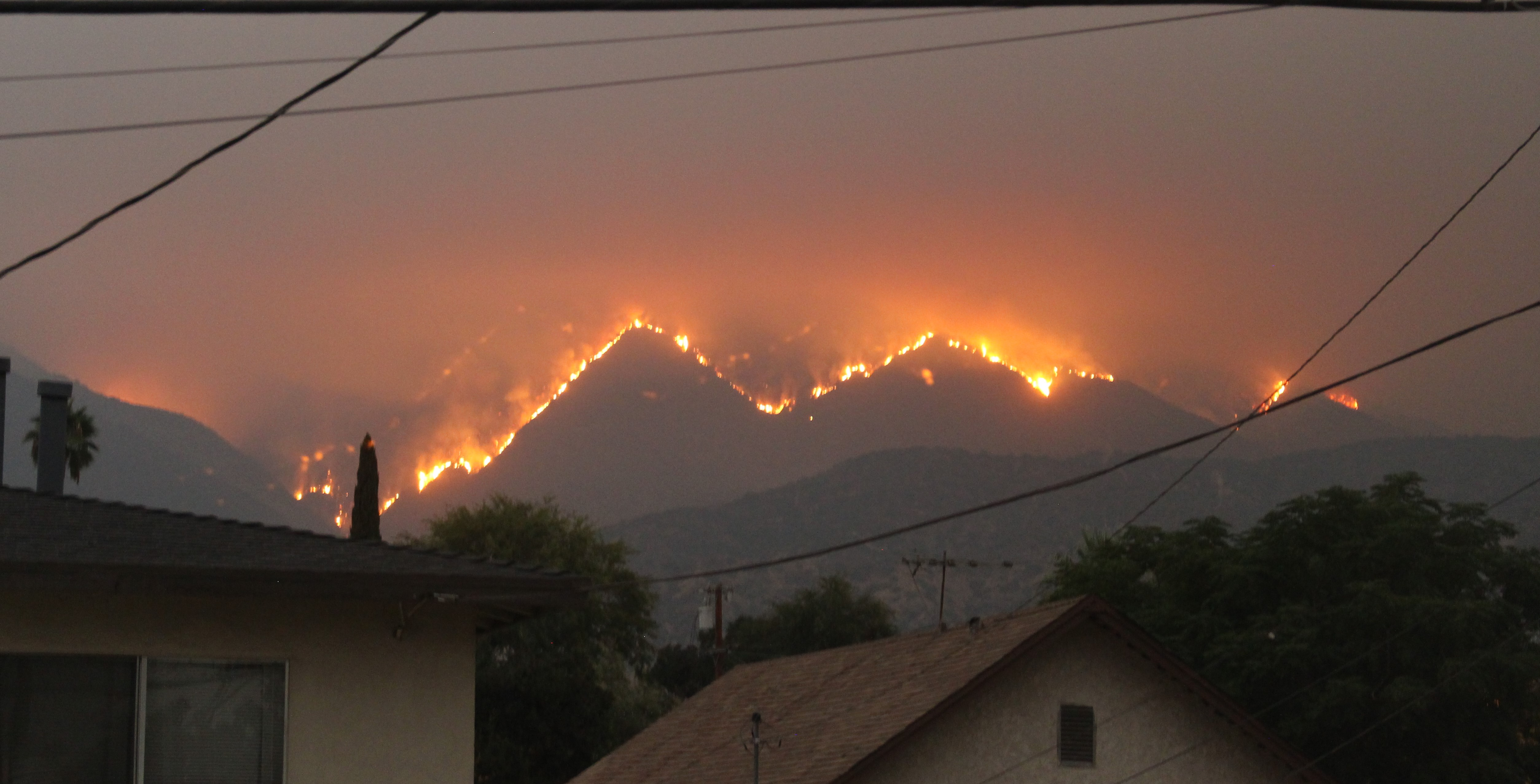
Bobcat Fire viewed from Monrovia, California
