= Prude (album) =

Studio album by Drug Church
- Released: October 4, 2024
- Recorded: 2022–2023
- Studio: Pale Moon Ranch (Juniper Hills); The Animal Farm (Flemington); Balboa (Los Angeles)
- Length: 28:39
- Label: Pure Noise
- Producer: Jon Markson

Drug Church chronology
Hygiene (2022)	Prude (2024)

Singles from Prude
- 1. "Myopic" Released: March 1, 2023; 2. "Demolition Man" Released: July 17, 2024; 3. "Chow" Released: August 14, 2024; 4. "Slide 2 Me" Released: September 18, 2024

Prude (stylized all uppercase) is the fifth studio album by American post-hardcore band Drug Church. The album was released on October 4, 2024, through Pure Noise Records.

== Background and recording ==
Drug Church began working on Prude shortly after the release of their previous album, Hygiene. Vocalist Patrick Kindlon described the album's creative process as one without a predetermined theme. He revealed in an interview that he writes lyrics as he listens to the music, often without clear direction. Kindlon has stated that the record is largely a reflection of the times and his personal experiences, specifically his frustrations with societal cynicism and the pervasive culture of online toxicity.

Despite this seemingly disjointed approach, there is a clear thematic thread throughout the album that revolves around characters who are "misled or lost in life." Kindlon has said that while many of his lyrics may come across as cynical, he tries not to be judgmental, expressing that "fucked up people don’t gotta stay fucked up forever." Instead of offering solutions or moral lessons, the album portrays individuals struggling with their place in an increasingly alienated world.

Recording sessions for Prude were guided by Jon Markson, who helped the band refine their sound and structure. Kindlon mentioned that the songs’ energy often dictated the lyrical content. He also highlighted the collaboration with Markson as integral to shaping the final tracks, with Markson providing “helpful nudges” to ensure the lyrics fit with the music.

== Music and composition ==
Lyrically, Prude grapples with issues of disconnection, societal decay, and introspection. Kindlon touches on a modern world consumed by negativity and the pressure to succeed in the face of public scrutiny. The track “Peer Review” epitomizes this, as it confronts the idea that any individual could easily succumb to the struggles of others, blurring the lines between victim and perpetrator. Kindlon stated that the record explores the "venom" people feel towards one another in today’s world, where people seem more interested in watching others fail than in their own achievements.

While some songs offer a narrative structure, such as “Slide 2 Me” and “Business Ethics,” which Kindlon identifies as personal favorites for their storytelling elements, others lean into pure emotional release, mirroring the high-energy instrumentation provided by the band.

Musically, the album has been described as hardcore punk, grunge, alternative rock, post-hardcore, and melodic hardcore.

== Release and promotion ==
=== Singles ===
In anticipation of their spring 2023 tour, Drug Church released "Myopic" as a standalone single on March 1, 2023, which was ultimately included on the album. Over a year later, on July 17, 2024, the band released "Demolition Man," the first official single.

On August 14, 2024, Drug Church followed up with the single "Chow". Shortly before the album’s release, "Slide 2 Me" was released on September 18, 2024. The song featured a balance of intensity and melody, offering a more reflective tone while maintaining the band's distinctive edge.

=== Music videos ===
On September 17, 2024, the music video for "Slide 2 Me" was released. The music video was directed by Manuel Barajas.

== Critical reception ==
Professional ratings
Review scores
Source	Rating
Distorted Sound	4.5/5 stars
Dork	4/5 stars
Exclaim!	8/10
Far Out	4.5/5 stars
Kerrang!	4/5 stars
PopMatters	8/10
Stereogum	Positive

Prude has been well-received by contemporary music critics. Lukas Neilson, writing for Distorted Sound awarded the album a 9 out of 10 praising the musicianship. Nielson said that the album "is nothing if not fun. These tracks feel purpose built for the live environment, and having these tracks as an arrow in their quiver for touring going forward will no doubt have them continue their upwards trajectory". Steven Loftin, writing for Dork gave the album four stars out of five saying "it's another Drug Church album that leaves no stone unturned on their quest to unload the alchemy that runs so solidly between them." Arun Starkey, praised the humor throughout the album saying "from the animated, consuming music to the odd bits of wisdom Kindlon’s stream of consciousness provides once more, this is the sound of a band utterly faithful in their abilities, and there is nothing quite like it. They push on as a unit."

Stereogum writer Danielle Chelosky gave the album the website's Album of the Week honor, comparing it to Turnstile, saying "When I listen to Prude, I wonder if anything’s stopping them from reaching Tunstile-level fame. It’s loud, it’s catchy, it’s smart. Opener “Mad Care” encapsulates the vigor of the start of a show: The wave of adrenaline running through the crowd, the push that sends people stumbling, the euphoric madness beginning, heightened by Kindlon’s infectious refrains: “This is your situation/ This is your circumstance/ This is your fork in the road/ This is where pathways branch."

== Track listing ==
All tracks are written by Drug Church.

Prude track listing
No.	Title	Length
1.	"Mad Care"	2:25
2.	"Myopic"	2:56
3.	"Hey Listen"	2:41
4.	"Demolition Man"	2:45
5.	"Business Ethics"	2:46
6.	"Slide 2 Me"	2:37
7.	"Chow"	2:49
8.	"The Bitters"	3:10
9.	"Yankee Trails"	2:47
10.	"Peer Review"	3:43
Total length:		28:39

== Charts ==
Chart performance for Prude
Chart (2024)	Peak position
UK Album Downloads (OCC)	57
UK Independent Albums (OCC)	38
US Digital Albums (Billboard)	45
US Heatseekers Albums (Billboard)	22
US Top Album Sales (Billboard)	32
US Top Hard Rock Albums (Billboard)	3
US Top Rock Albums (Billboard)	12
US Vinyl Albums (Billboard)	17

== Personnel ==
Drug Church

- Chris Villeneuve – drums
- Patrick Wynne – bass
- Nick Cogan – guitar
- Cory Galusha – guitar
- Patrick Kindlon – vocals

Additional contributors

- Jon Markson – production, mixing, engineering
- Mike Kalajian – mastering
- Rob Chiarappa – additional engineering
- Alex Salter – drum technician
- Lulu Lin – cover illustration
- Joey Ginaldi – design, layout
- Dookie Meño – photography
