= Myopia (disambiguation) =

Myopia, also known as "nearsightedness", is a refractive defect of the eye.

Myopia may also refer to:

== Music ==
- Myopia (Tom Fogerty album), 1974
- Myopia (Rachael Sage album), 2018
- Myopia (Agnes Obel album), 2020
- "Myopia", a track from the Moby album Ambient
- "Myopia", a track from the Enter Shikari album The Mindsweep
- "Myopic" (Drug Church song), 2023

== Other uses ==
- Alcohol myopia, a cognitive-physiological theory
- Marketing myopia, a concept in strategic management
- Myopia Hunt Club, a foxhunting and private country club
