= Drug Church =

American punk rock band

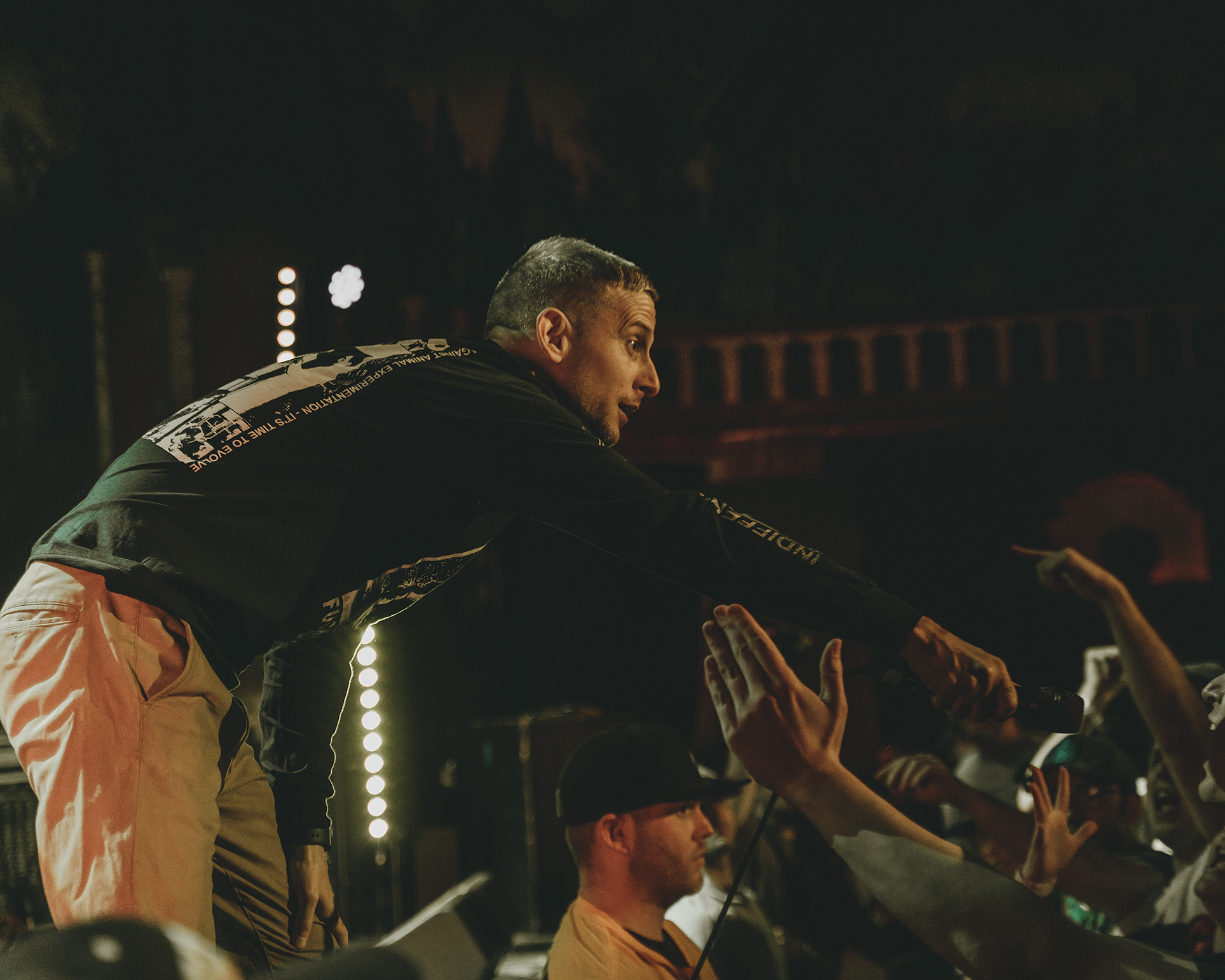
- Patrick Kindlon performing with Drug Church in Denver. March 2023

Background information
- Origin: Albany, New York, United States
- Genres: Hardcore punk; post-hardcore; alternative rock; punk rock; post-punk
- Years active: 2011–present
- Labels: Pure Noise; No Sleep; Secret Voice; Ride The Fury
- Spinoffs: Militarie Gun; Pile of Love
- Spinoff of: Self Defense Family
- Members: Patrick Kindlon; Nick Cogan; Cory Galusha; Chris Villeneuve; Pat Wynne

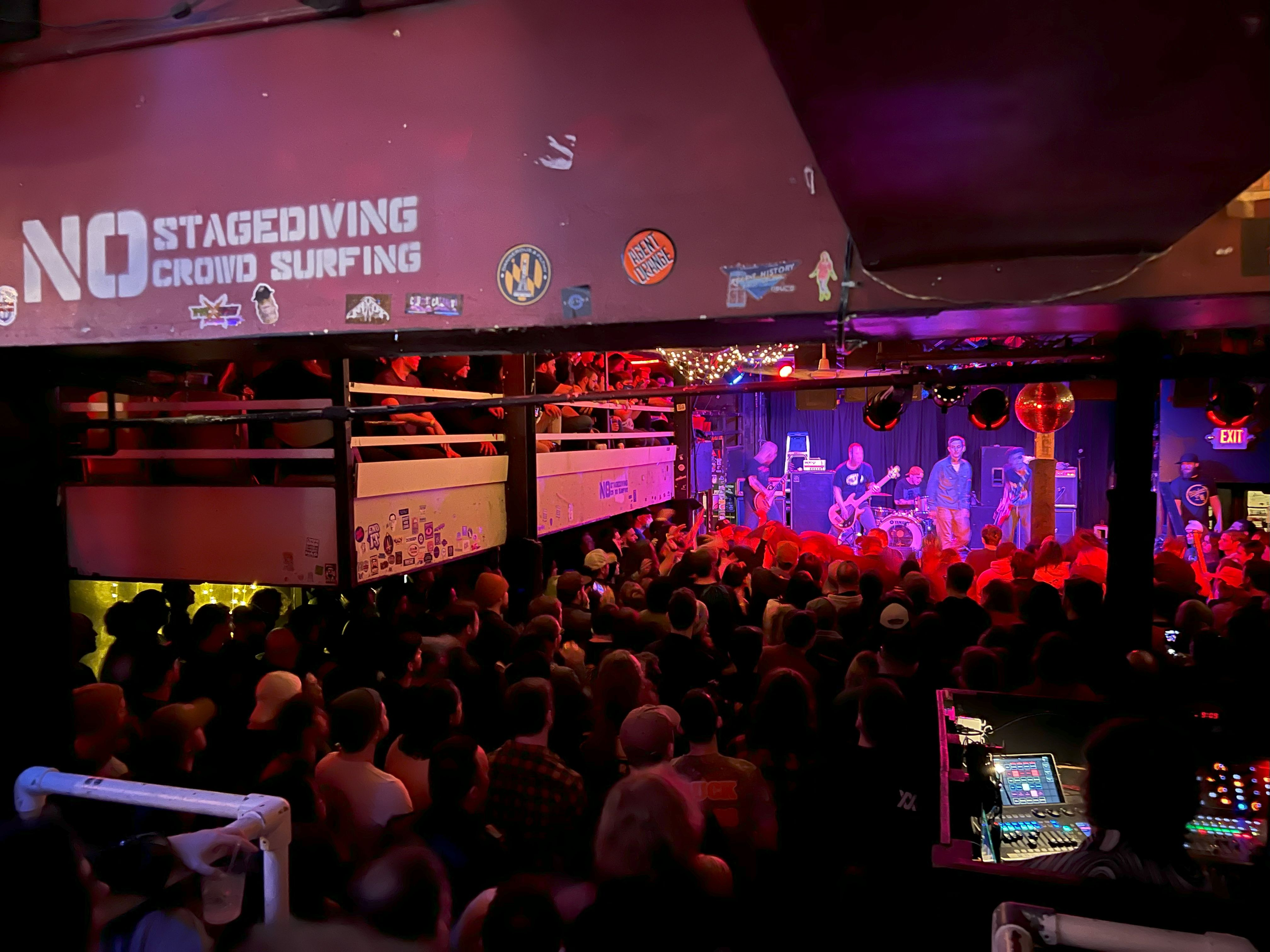
Drug Church performing at the Ottobar in Baltimore, 2023

Drug Church is an American hardcore punk band from Albany, New York, United States. The band has released five albums, as well as several EPs.

== History ==
Drug Church started as a side project for singer Patrick Kindlon of Self Defense Family. After having released a three-song demo online in 2011, the band got signed by No Sleep Records by the beginning of 2012. The band's original lineup included Kindlon, guitarist Nick Cogan, bassist Cory Galusha, and drummer Chris Villeneuve. They were later joined by Patrick Wynne on bass, expanding to a five-piece in the process and moving Galusha over to guitar; this line-up has remained intact since. Their debut self-titled EP was released in 2012, and it received critical acclaim for its raw and aggressive sound.

Drug Church's debut full-length album, Paul Walker (named after the late actor of the same name), was released in 2013 and was well received by music critics. The band's sophomore album, "Hit Your Head," was released in 2015.

In 2018, Drug Church signed with Pure Noise Records released their third album, Cheer which demonstrated the band's willingness to experiment with different styles such as grunge while retaining their punk ethos. The album was named as Kerrang! Magazine's Album of the Week and received praise for its introspective and honest lyrics, as well as its willingness to tackle complex themes. The song "Foam Pit" was included in The Alternative's Best of 2018 compilation, and the band received "Most Underrated" in the site's awards for that year.

The band's fourth album Hygiene was announced on November 10, 2021 with the release of the singles "Million Miles of Fun" (a reference to Len's "Steal My Sunshine") and "Detective Lieutenant", and was released on March 11, 2022 through Pure Noise Records. On March 1, 2023, the band released the single Myopic through Pure Noise Records, which was ultimately included on their fifth album, Prude, released on October 4, 2024. The release of Prude was flanked by the release of three singles: "Demolition Man", "Slide 2 Me" and "Myopic". Music videos were made for "Demolition Man" and "Slide to Me" that featured American actor Biff Wiff; in an interview with Far Out Magazine, Kindlon noted that the band had attempted to cast Tim Robinson due to his likeness to Kindlon but were unable to due to scheduling conflicts.

== Musical style ==
Drug Church's music is characterized by its eclectic blend of punk rock, post-hardcore, and alternative rock. Their sound has evolved over the years, moving from a raw and aggressive punk style to a more diverse and experimental approach. Lyrically, the band explores a wide range of themes, often delving into social and personal issues with a unique combination of humor and thoughtfulness. The band also mixes hardcore punk in the style of bands like Black Flag with alternative rock and grunge elements to create their post-punk/post-hardcore sound. The lyrics to their songs focus mostly on social matters and tend to be dark and/or satirical. In a Q&A Session on the website of his other project Self Defense Family, Kindlon has stated that he has no pre-written lyrics for his bands and rather writes the songs' lyrics while in the studio:

Completely different people write the instrument portion of the music. Leads to a very different feel, so, very different lyrics. Also, I write everything in the studio. So, there’s no bank of lyrics I pull from. This is made to order, not buffet.

== Band members ==
- Nick Cogan – guitar (2011–present)
- Cory Galusha – guitar (2011–present), bass (2011)
- Patrick Kindlon – lead vocals (2011–present)
- Chris Villeneuve – drums (2011–present), backing vocals (2024–present)
- Patrick Wynne – bass (2011–present)

== Discography ==
=== Studio albums ===
Album	Year	Label
Paul Walker	2013	No Sleep Records
Hit Your Head	2015	No Sleep Records
Cheer	2018	Pure Noise Records
Hygiene	2022	Pure Noise Records
Prude	2024	Pure Noise Records

=== EPs and other ===
Name	Year	Label
Demo	2011	Ride the Fury Records
Drug Church	2012	No Sleep Records
"Party at Dead Man's" b/w "Selling Drugs from Your Mom's Condo"	2013	Secret Voice
Swell	2015	No Sleep Records
Tawny	2021	Pure Noise Records

=== Singles ===
- "Weed Pin" (2017)
- "Bliss Out" (2020)
- "Myopic" (2023)
- "Demolition Man" (2024)
- "Pynch" (2026)
