= Cheer (Drug Church album) =

Studio album by Drug Church
- Released: November 2, 2018
- Recorded: May–June 2018
- Genre: Post-hardcore; hardcore punk; alternative rock
- Length: 32:27
- Label: Pure Noise
- Producer: Jon Markson

Drug Church chronology
Hit Your Head (2015)	Cheer (2018)	Tawny (2021)

Singles from Cheer
- 1. "Weed Pin" Released: November 2, 2017

Cheer is the third studio album by American post-hardcore band Drug Church. The album was released on November 2, 2018, through Pure Noise Records.

== Critical reception ==
Professional ratings
Aggregate scores
Source	Rating
Metacritic	84/100
Review scores
Source	Rating
Drowned in Sound	8/10
Exclaim!	8/10
Kerrang!	4/5 stars
Sputnikmusic	4/5 stars

Cheer received critical acclaim upon its release. On review aggregator website, Metacritic, Cheer has an average critic score of 84 out of 100, indicating "universal acclaim based on four critic reviews".

== Track listing ==
All tracks are written by Drug Church.

Cheer track listing
No.	Title	Length
1.	"Grubby"	1:37
2.	"Strong References"	2:59
3.	"Avoidarama"	2:58
4.	"Dollar Story"	2:43
5.	"Unlicensed Guidance Counselor"	3:49
6.	"Weed Pin"	4:42
7.	"Unlicensed Hall Monitor"	3:21
8.	"Foam Pit"	2:31
9.	"Conflict Minded"	2:57
10.	"Tillary"	4:46
Total length:		32:27

== Personnel ==
Drug Church

- Nick Cogan - electric guitar
- Cory Galusha - electric guitar
- Patrick Kindlon - vocals
- Chris Villeneuve - drums
- Patrick Wynne - bass

Additional personnel

- Anne Elisabeth Grushecky - design
- Mike Kalajian - mastering
- Jon Markson - producing, recording, mixing
- Maria Serrano - artwork
- Mitchell Wojcik - photography
