= October 2009 North American storm complex =

Weather event in North America

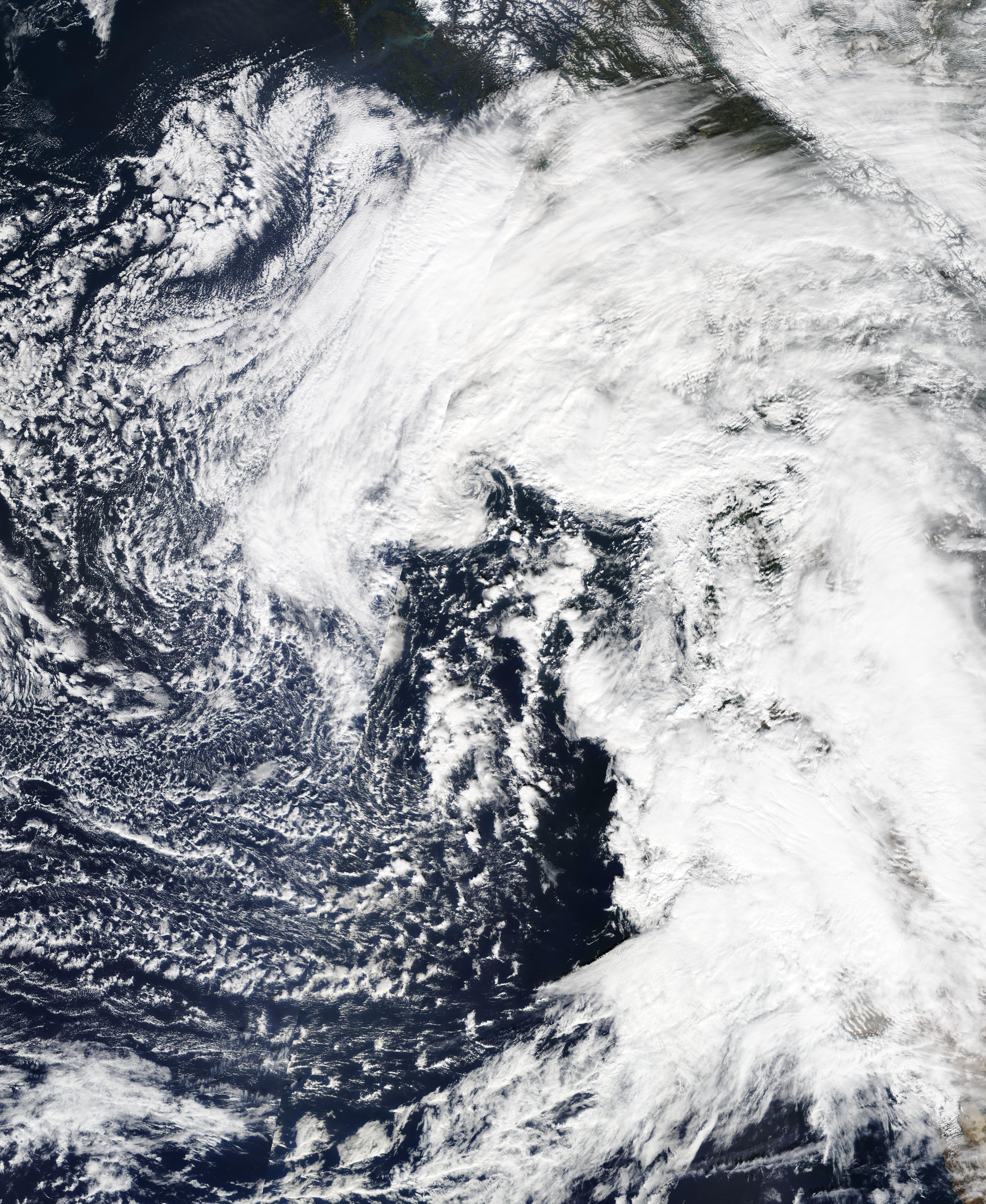
- Visible satellite image of the system off the coast of the Western United States on October 13, taken using the MODIS imager aboard the Terra satellite

Meteorological history
- Formed: October 7, 2009
- Dissipated: October 20, 2009

Extratropical cyclone
- Highest gusts: 135 mph (217 km/h) along the Sierra Crest
- Lowest pressure: 966 mbar (28.5 inHg)
- Max. rainfall: 21.34 in (542 mm) of rain in Monterey County, California
- Max. snowfall: 23 in (580 mm) at Mammoth Mountain Ski Area

Overall effects
- Fatalities: 2
- Damage: $8.861 million (2009 USD)
- Areas affected: Southeast Alaska, Western Canada, Eastern Canada, Contiguous United States, Northern Mexico
- Part of the 2009–10 North American winter

The October 2009 North American storm complex was a powerful extratropical cyclone that was associated with the remnants of Typhoon Melor, which brought extreme amounts of rainfall to California. The system started out as a weak area of low pressure (an Aleutian Low), that formed in the northern Gulf of Alaska on October 7. Late on October 11, the system quickly absorbed Melor's remnant moisture, which resulted in the system strengthening significantly offshore, before moving southeastward to impact the West Coast of the United States, beginning very early on October 13. Around the same time, an atmospheric river opened up (the Pineapple Express), channeling large amounts of moisture into the storm, resulting in heavy rainfall across California and other parts of the Western United States. The storm caused at least $8.861 million (2009 USD) in damages across the West Coast of the United States.

== Meteorological synopsis ==
Map plotting the storm's track and intensity, according to the Saffir–Simpson scale Map key Saffir–Simpson scale Tropical depression (≤38 mph, ≤62 km/h) Tropical storm (39–73 mph, 63–118 km/h) Category 1 (74–95 mph, 119–153 km/h) Category 2 (96–110 mph, 154–177 km/h) Category 3 (111–129 mph, 178–208 km/h) Category 4 (130–156 mph, 209–251 km/h) Category 5 (≥157 mph, ≥252 km/h) Unknown Storm type Tropical cyclone Subtropical cyclone Extratropical cyclone, remnant low, tropical disturbance, or monsoon depression

On October 7, an extratropical disturbance developed over the northern Gulf of Alaska, at the end of the warm front of a weakening extratropical system. During the next couple of days, the system slowly strengthened, before undergoing explosive intensification on October 9, over southern Alaska. Late on October 11, the extratropical cyclone absorbed the disorganized remnant of Typhoon Melor, causing the system's intensification to accelerate. On October 12, the system began moving southeastward towards the West Coast of the United States, while slowly strengthening. The system began moving ashore on October 13, part of the storm complex split off and accelerated eastward across the United States, which ended up being absorbed by a nor'easter on October 15. Soon after the initial split on October 13, the storm complex's low pressure center split, with the northern low quickly dominating the system.

Later on the same day, the storm complex reached a peak intensity of 966 millibars (28.5 inHg), even as the system began looping back northwestwards, towards the Gulf of Alaska. On October 14, the storm system continued to looped back northwestward while weakening, but another part of the storm split off from the main system, which headed westward across the northern states. The two main lows merged again, even as the eastern chunk of moisture continued to accelerate eastward across the U.S., reaching the Central United States.

On October 15, the eastern chunk of moisture began exiting the Northeastern United States, while the main system continued to move northwestward in the Gulf of Alaska, weakening into a 988 mbar storm. On October 17, the main low stalled just south of Alaska, while steadily weakening, even as the eastern chunk of moisture began a well-defined extratropical cyclone off the coast of Nova Scotia. On October 18, the storm system moved to the south of Alaska, and absorbed a weak low to the south of the system, while the former eastern chunk of the system began to accelerate northeastward into the Labrador Sea, and received the name Yannick from the Free University of Berlin. On October 19, the central low of the storm system stalled just south of Alaska once again, and rapidly weakened to a disorganized 1010 mbar system.

On October 20, the main system was absorbed by another powerful extratropical cyclone in the Gulf of Alaska, to the west of the system. On October 20, Windstorm Yannick reached a minimum low pressure of 970 mbar (29 inHg), while south of Iceland. During the next two days, Yannick slowly moved northeastward, while steadily weakening. On October 23, Yannick split into 2 storms just northeast of Ireland, with the main system weakening into a 980 mbar storm. On October 24, Yannick was absorbed by another approaching extratropical cyclone from the east.

== Impact ==
=== California ===
The storm system, which was powered by the remnants of Melor, became one of the most intense storms to impact the state of California during October on record. Numerous locations recorded rainfall in excess of 10 in (250 mm) in a 24-hour span, with a maximum of 21.34 in (542 mm) falling at Mining Ridge, Monterey County. This amount surpassed the previous rainfall record from a tropical cyclone or its remnants in the state by nearly 7 in (180 mm). Hurricane Kathleen in 1976 held the record prior to Melor, producing a maximum of 14.76 in (375 mm) at San Gorgonio Mountain. In San Francisco, an all-time record was set of 2.49 in (63 mm) in a 24-hour span, greater than any other total since records began in 1849. At higher elevations, significant amounts of snow fell; exact totals are not known, but estimated to be at least several feet. Strong winds also accompanied the record rainfall. Hurricane-force wind gusts, recorded up to 87 mph (140 km/h), were associated with Melor's remnants. Similar winds were likely felt in higher elevations, resulting in blizzard conditions. Although the rainfall was record-breaking, it significantly helped to alleviate one of California's worst droughts on record, spanning several years. Rainfall from the storm system also helped extinguish several wildfires that were burning in California at that time, including the large Station Fire. At San Marcos Pass, rainfall from the storm surpassed the all-time record October rainfall in a single day, with 10.31 in (262 mm) falling at the pass.

In areas near San Francisco, hundreds of car accidents occurred due to wet roads and high winds. On the Richmond Bridge, a tractor-trailer was blown on its side, landing on a passing car; however, the two passengers of the car and the truck driver were uninjured. This accident resulted in all east-bound lanes on the bridge being shut down from 3:00 pm to 5:30 pm. The California Highway Patrol stated that they received over 3,000 calls during the first half of the day concerning accidents, against the normal 1,000 calls during an entire day without rain. A crash in the Caldecott Tunnel, requiring emergency repairs to the structure, led to a temporary closure and creating more traffic issues. A three car collision on state Highway 1 resulted in the death of one person. The section of the highway near the crash was shut down for near four hours also. Over 200 accidents occurred throughout the day around San Francisco due to the storm.

Throughout the Santa Cruz Mountains, several roads were closed due to flooding. Along Swanton Road, emergency officials issued a mandatory evacuation of 60 residents due to the flooding. Schools in San Lorenzo Valley were closed for the day due to the rising waters. Some residents were trapped by waters reaching a depth of 6 ft (1.8 m), leading to emergency rescues. High winds resulted in major air traffic delays, with officials noting average delays of three or more hours.

At the height of the storm, more than 35,000 residences were without power initially due to heavy rain; however, wind eventually worsened power issues, as branches began to fall on power lines. A transmission emergency was declared on the evening of October 12 as a 500,000 volt power line was blown down. In northern portions of the state, winds exceeding 80 mph (130 km/h) left hundreds of thousands of people without power and sparked several power line fires. The storm was described as "just phenomenal" by meteorologists. In response to the storm, flood disaster agencies allocated 20,000 sandbags for immediate deployment. All state and emergency operation centers in the state were activated on October 14, and support from electric companies in Arizona and Nevada was received to assist in power restoration. In California, the storm caused a total of at least $8.856 million (2009 USD) in damages, including $300,000 in agricultural damage.

=== Other states ===
In Oregon, the remnants of Melor brought heavy rains and high winds to many areas. Maximum rainfall associated with the system was around 1 in (25 mm), making the remnants of Melor the third known tropical cyclone, or remnants of a cyclone, to impact state. Minor effects were recorded in terms of damage: one rockslide took place on Highway 101 and large swells affected the coastline. In mountainous areas of Nevada, the storm produced upwards of 1 ft (0.30 m) of snow and winds over 50 mph (80 km/h). Several accidents took place on slick roadways during the storm; however, no fatalities or major injuries were reported. The highest winds were at the peaks of the Sierra mountains, which reached 135 mph (217 km/h), equivalent to a strong Category 4 hurricane. At least 2 in (51 mm) of rain fell along the foothills of the mountains, making the remnants of Melor one of the wettest former tropical cyclones to impact the state of Nevada. In Minnesota, a region rarely affected by the remnants of tropical cyclones, the jet stream carried moisture from the system into the state, causing the region to receive moderate rainfall from the storm system. On October 14 and 15, moisture from the storm affected the state, with estimated rainfall totals peaking at 0.85 in (22 mm).

Heavy snow fell in parts of Pennsylvania between October 15 and 16. State College, Pennsylvania saw ten inches (25 cm) of wet snow, causing a very memorable Penn State homecoming game, and breaking numerous records, such as earliest recorded snowfall, most severe October snowstorm, and most snow in the month of October. Moderate snow fell between October 15 and 18 in the Northeastern United States, as far as the suburbs of New York City, with light snow being reported in the city itself. In Walpack, New Jersey, temperatures during the system dropped to 25 °F (−4 °C). Boston suburbs saw moderate, wet snow fall on the morning of October 16, in spots accumulating up to 0.5 inches (1.3 cm). The area was then hit on October 18, when in the afternoon, heavy rain turned to heavy snow and almost white-out conditions. The ground was too warm for any significant accumulation, but up to 2 inches (5.1 cm) were reported at spots between Boston and Lowell. All of the snow melted by October 20.

== See also ==
- Typhoon Melor (2009)
- 2009 Pacific typhoon season
- 2009 California wildfires
- Global storm activity of 2009
- Winter storms of 2009–10 in East Asia
- Columbus Day Storm of 1962 – Associated with the remnants of Typhoon Freda. It caused the lowest pressure ever measured in Oregon to be recorded.
- January 2008 North American storm complex
- October 2010 North American storm complex
- January 2010 North American winter storms
- December 2010 North American blizzard
- November 2014 Bering Sea cyclone
- December 2014 North American storm complex
