= Hit Your Head =

Studio album by Drug Church
- Released: October 30, 2015
- Recorded: 2014
- Genre: Alternative rock; post-hardcore
- Length: 25:49
- Label: No Sleep

Drug Church chronology
Paul Walker (2013)	Hit Your Head (2015)	Cheer (2018)

Singles from Hit Your Head
- 1. "Hit Your Head, Greedy" Released: October 9, 2015

Professional ratings
Review scores
Source	Rating
The Music	4/5 stars
Punknews.org	3.5/5 stars
Rockfreaks	8/10
The Soundboard	4/10
Sputnikmusic	2.5/5 stars

Hit Your Head is the second studio album by American post-hardcore band, Drug Church. The album was released on October 30, 2015 through No Sleep Records.

== Background and recording ==
The album was recorded in late 2014 into early 2015. One single, "Hit Your Head, Greedy", was released prior to the release of the album.

== Music and composition ==
The album has been described as alternative rock and post-hardcore by critics.

== Track listing ==
All tracks are written by Nick Cogan, Cory Galusha, Patrick Kindlon, Chris Villeneuve, and Patrick Wynne.

No.	Title	Length
1.	"Banco Popular"	1:36
2.	"Aleister"	2:03
3.	"Aging Jerk"	2:41
4.	"Bagged"	2:06
5.	"Drunk Tank"	3:24
6.	"Green Like Me"	2:39
7.	"Park and Ride and Park and Ride"	2:19
8.	"Hit Your Head, Greedy"	3:07
9.	"Then Try"	1:30
10.	"Big And Shitty"	2:13
11.	"What"	3:06
Total length:		26:49

== Personnel ==
- Nick Cogan – guitar
- Cory Galusha – guitar
- Patrick Kindlon – vocals
- Chris Villeneuve – drums
- Patrick Wynne – bass
