= 1978 Agoura-Malibu firestorm =

1978 wildfires in Southern California

Agoura-Malibu firestorm
- Date: October 23, 1978 9:41 a.m. – October 25, 1978 (Pacific Time Zone)
- Location: Los Angeles Counties, California, United States
- Coordinates: 34°8′35″N 118°44′13″W

Statistics
- Burned area: 25,000 acres (10,000 ha)
- Land use: Recreational and residential

Impacts
- Deaths: 3 civilians
- Injuries: 50 civilians
- Structures destroyed: 1,643 destroyed, 364 damaged
- Cost: $71.4 Million

Ignition
- Cause: Arson

Map
- Location within the United States Location within California Location within the Los Angeles metropolitan area

The 1978 Agoura-Malibu firestorm was a firestorm fueled by at least eight significant wildfires in the Los Angeles area on October 23, 1978. At around noon that day, an arsonist started a fire that eventually burned 25,000 acres (10,000 ha) from Cornell to Broad Beach in Malibu. The first fire alarm in Agoura was reported at 12:11 pm, and by 2:30 pm, the fire had reached the Pacific Ocean 13 miles (21 km) south in Malibu. It had been declared a Level 2 (maximum emergency) fire at 1:57 pm.

As the fires spread through the canyons of the Santa Monica Mountains over the next four days, a total of 230 homes were destroyed in Agoura and Malibu, and in the Los Angeles community of Mandeville Canyon to the east. At least 254 other structures were also destroyed. The fire was contained on October 25 and controlled on October 27. 136 engine companies, 28 camp crews, 8 bulldozers, 6 helicopters and 6 fixed wing air tankers helped fight this fire.

Known at the "Agoura-Malibu Firestorm" and the "Mandeville Canyon Fire", these two major fires were bolstered by winds as high as 60 miles per hour (97 km/h) and extremely dry conditions. Residents of Agoura evacuated to a shopping center next to the Ventura Freeway in Agoura Hills, where massive flames could be seen engulfing Castro Peak. Damage caused by the group of fires burning was estimated at US$71.4 million, according to California officials. Three people were killed and 50 were injured, according to the Los Angeles Fire Department. A 15-year-old Agoura youth was arrested for starting the fire, and sentenced to be confined in the California Youth Authority until his 21st birthday. Arson investigators determined that he had used a lit cigarette wrapped in a matchbook to set the fire.

This was the largest of several fires set over the period of a week in the Agoura area.

== Mandeville Canyon Fire ==
The Mandeville Canyon Fire began in arid Southern California and caused considerable harm to its citizens and infrastructure––resulting in over 200 destroyed homes and 3 fatalities as the fire burned through about 38,000 acres of land. On Monday, October 23 at 9:41 a.m., an uncontrolled brush fire in the Mulholland Drive region developed rapidly, and emergency officials declared a major emergency within about an hour after the initial report.

=== Fire situation ===
A brush fire in the San Fernando Valley, spread by the Santa Ana, carried the fire over 25,000 acres and thirteen miles to the coast. Aided by 100 mile-per-hour winds, the wildfire jumped the Pacific Coast Highway. Temperatures reached 2500 degrees Fahrenheit.

Various other blazes in Southern California accompanied this initial outbreak, heavily slowing down the LAFD's suppression efforts as it stretched across five days. Beginning what is now known as the Agoura-Malibu fires, another brush fire began in the Elsinore–Perris region and erupted into a series of seven brush fires in the span of six hours. This rapid development of fires––along with the initial Mulholland Drive fire––largely occurred because of the Santa Ana winds, an exacerbating force in the realm of wildfires. The winds peak in the cooler fall and spring seasons, where hot air encounters high pressure in the dry southwest and travels westward into the Southern California coast––blowing at a rate of about forty miles per hour. As the Southern California area simultaneously saw a buildup of dry timber, known as fuels, while entering a dry and windy season, the development of wildfires was imminent. Once the fuels caught fire, the dry, downslope Santa Ana winds fanned the flames as they grew at an exponentially fast rate, culminating in a series of wildfires throughout the region.

Chronological fire log beginning Monday Oct 23:
9:41 a.m. -- Mandeville Canyon fire erupts on Mulholland Drive.
10:20 a.m. -- Mandeville Canyon declared a major emergency.
10:40 a.m. -- The first of four brush fires begins in San Dimas.
10:59 a.m. -- Chino brush fire starts near Aerojet General, heads for Carbon Canyon in Orange County.
12:11 p.m. -- Agoura fire alarm.
12:38 p.m. -- Agoura is declared Level 1 (major emergency, fire management organization begins, "war room" procedures include expanded communications and support systems.)
12:47 p.m. -- Agua Dulce brush fire near Palatable.
1:34 p.m. -- Glendale fire.
1:57 p.m. -- Agoura declared Level 2 fire (maximum emergency, calling for everything available.)
2:30 p.m. -- Agoura-Malibu fire reaches the sea, 13 miles from start.
3:02 p.m. -- Brush fire starts north of Sierra Madre, heads up the San Gabriel Mountains.

=== Fire Department response ===
The Los Angeles County Fire Department dispatched 300 firefighters to manage the Mandeville Canyon blaze, and ultimately faced a personnel shortage in the process. Off-duty officers in the region thus served as a supplementary addition to the fire-fighting effort. This labor shortage likely occurred due to the fire department's simultaneous response to the more powerful Malibu fires, for around 500 firefighters were sent to the Agoura-Malibu region where the wildfire had stretched toward the ocean for about 20 miles.

As the brush fires in Mandeville Canyon grew powerful enough to prompt an emergency response, Battalion Chief Gary Henery ordered what is known as a "full response" to manage the nearby conflagration, sending, "five engines, four camp crews, two helicopters, two patrol trucks, and two tractors". This circumstance called for a swift response, and––within minutes––Chief Henrey also called for tanker planes and additional engines to manage the fire's challenging pace. Burning through about 23,000 acres of land, the Mandeville fire moved rapidly and would reach the Pacific Coast Highway in a matter of two hours––traveling a distance of about 36 miles. Additionally, the scramble for residents in the area to evacuate proved to complicate the fire-fighting effort, as many firemen reported that crowds of inhabitants and curious spectators swarmed the areas of greatest concern. Sunset Boulevard also became congested with traffic, serving as a potential hazard as emergency vehicles entered the scene.

=== Results ===
Weather conditions improved the following day, October 24, with lower temperatures and fog beginning to develop. The crew thus worked under a more favorable climate, and by 7 a.m. on Wednesday, October 25, the LAFD announced full containment of the wildfire––where the crew succeeded in creating a "fire break" by digging around the fire's perimeter. It was extensively under control, or fully extinguished, by Friday.

=== Community reaction ===
According to Mandeville Canyon residents, the LAFD took a dangerously prolonged approach to managing the initial brush fires, witnesses citing a lack of manpower, and many emergency officials admitted that their resources were simply too limited to offer a more rapid response; for instance, Chief England recalled that "When we saw the speed it was moving, we tried to release equipment, but we were spread too thin". As the fire continued to burn on October 25, fire officials thus criticized their city government for issuing personnel cutbacks through Proposition 13––an initiative which limited property taxes through the reallocation of funds from emergency services––claiming that the LAFD's delayed response could be attributed to their shortage of manpower.

This statement would cause controversy in political spheres; for instance, LA councilman Marvin Braude, who was present at the scene of the Mandeville Canyon fire, stated that the fire department's requests for units and gear were promptly fulfilled without shortages. Braude served on the City Council's Finance Committee and had a hand in passing Proposition 13. Apart from an explicit conflict of interest, it is difficult to discern whether a councilman has the authority to judge an adequate fire-fighting response, particularly when many officials were primarily concerned with staff rather than resources. While the city did not amend Proposition 13 to offer greater support to fire departments, they were legally obligated to compensate property owners for the wildfire's damage. As the Santa Ana winds prompted the city's power lines to drop and spark the initial brush fires, they were held liable and eventually paid $8.5 million to twenty- two Mandeville residents and eight insurance companies.

== Malibu Fire Ecology ==
Malibu had experienced a postwar influx of coastal settlers, many of which were middle class artists. This migration overlapped with a period of severe drought. Fire historian Stephen Pyne notes this moment as a shift from a traditional forest fire model to a “lethal” fire regime in which the rise in development situated suburban communities within the fire-prone chaparral biome of Southern California, producing a cycle in which post-fire redevelopment provided fodder for inevitable future wildfires.

The 1978 Agoura-Malibu firestorm exemplified this new wildfire paradigm. When legislators suggested coastal regulations to restrict development in Malibu, developers reacted by preemptively escalating their subdivision and development efforts, which made the area more vulnerable to the 1978 firestorm. In fact, the consumption set new speed records and caused millions of dollars worth of damage.

The disaster relief policies that followed the 1978 fire refigured the socioeconomic makeup of the land. The federal government recognized the area as a federal disaster area, allowing tax relief and low-interest loans, which allowed for grander, more expensive development. This shaped a systematic displacement of lower-income residents of Malibu and allowed the area to gradually increase in wealth. UCLA librarian Lawrence Clark Powell lamented this transformation: “Each succeeding house, bigger and grander, takes the view of its neighbors in a kind of unbridled competition.”

The homeowners living within the increasingly exclusive neighborhoods in Malibu directed frustration towards the effort to expand public access to their beaches. The California Coastal Commission had proposed public access through Trancas Beach, which the residents rejected, pressuring Governor Jerry Brown to condemn his own commission. These tensions between public coastal access and private property interests continued in the years following the 1978 fire, culminating in Malibu homeowners sabotaging a public access project at El Pescador Beach during the next major wildfire, the 1982 Trancas Canyon firestorm.

== See also ==
- Bel Air Fire
- Palisades Fire
- Clampitt Fire
- January 2025 Southern California wildfires, another series of wildfires that rapidly spread with extremely dry conditions and winds in Los Angeles County.
