= Tawny (Drug Church EP) =

EP by Drug Church
- Released: June 25, 2021
- Recorded: 2019–2020
- Length: 11:20
- Label: Pure Noise
- Producer: Jon Markson

Drug Church chronology
Cheer (2018)	Tawny (2021)	Hygiene (2022)

Singles from Tawny
- 1. "Bliss Out" Released: January 21, 2020; 2. "Tawny" Released: April 21, 2021

Tawny is an extended play released by American post-hardcore band, Drug Church. The band's fifth overall EP, it was released on June 25, 2021 through Pure Noise Records.

The EP, featuring the band's 2020 single, "Bliss Out" was intended by the band to be a holdover release between the release of their third studio album, Cheer, which came out in 2018, and at the time, their forthcoming fourth studio album, Hygiene, which was released the following year.

== Background and promotion ==
The songs for the EP were written and recorded throughout 2019 and 2020, with the first single, "Bliss Out", being recorded in summer 2019. In summer 2020, the rest of the album was recorded.

Two of the four tracks on the EP were released as singles. The first single, "Bliss Out" was released on January 21, 2020. The self-titled single, "Tawny" (stylized in all-caps), was released on April 22, 2021. With the release of the self-titled single, the EP itself was announced.

== Critical reception ==
Professional ratings
Review scores
Source	Rating
Boolin Tunes	7.5/10
Distorted Sound	8/10 stars
Kerrang!	4/5 stars
Invict Magazine	8/10
The Razors Edge	Positive

Mischa Pearlman of Kerrang! gave the EP a four out of five-star review. In her review, Pearlman said that Tawny "is beautifully brutal – or maybe brutally beautiful – and serves, like the rest of this EP, as both a perfect antidote to, and reflection of, the troubled times in which we live." Danny Lowlife, writing for Invict magazine gave the EP an 8 out of 10, saying that Tawny is an EP "that could not be released at a better time. It is comprehensively done, there is nothing within this that lacks character or presents itself in a way which is the identity of another band. You listen to it and you know who is playing, who is singing. It is a wonderful EP that will have first time listeners ready for a larger album." In a slightly more mixed review, Paul Greenan, of Boolin Tunes gave the album a 7.5 out of 10, emphasizing the album as a good listen for existing fans of the band. Greenan did emphasize that the EP is "not a detour from what you’d expect, at risk of maybe sounding a little samey at points, but it’s a nice appetiser before their next release, which I can only assume will be a new LP. In the meantime, enjoy this bite-sized portion of post-hardcore snark".

== Track listing ==
All tracks are written by Drug Church, except where noted.

No.	Title	Length
1.	"Head-Off"	3:05
2.	"Tawny"	3:26
3.	"Bliss Out"	1:53
4.	"Remember to Forget" (Arcwelder cover)	2:56
Total length:		11:20

== Personnel ==
Drug Church

- Nick Cogan - electric guitar
- Cory Galusha - electric guitar
- Patrick Kindlon - vocals
- Chris Villeneuve - drums
- Patrick Wynne - bass

Additional personnel

- Alex Salter - assistant engineering, tambourine
- Jon Markson - producing, engineering, mixing, additional vocals
- Skylar Sarkis - additional vocals
