= Myopic (Drug Church song) =

Single by Drug Church

from the album Prude
- Released: March 1, 2023
- Genre: Alternative rock; grunge; melodic hardcore; hardcore punk
- Length: 2:58
- Label: Pure Noise
- Producer: Jon Markson

Drug Church singles chronology
"Premium Offer" (2022)	"Myopic" (2023)	"Demolition Man" (2024)

Music video
- "Myopic" on YouTube

"Myopic" is a single by American hardcore band, Drug Church. The standalone single was released on March 1, 2023, through Pure Noise Records.

== Background and recording ==
The song was released in anticipation of their U.S. headlining tour in Spring 2023.

== Critical reception ==
"Myopic" has been well received by contemporary music critics, praising it as a continuing success to their album Hygiene. Tom Breihan, writing for Stereogum called "Myopic" an "absolute beast of a song" calling it an excellent promotional single ahead of their 2023 tour. Breihan further praised the lyricism of "Myopic" saying it's well-blended with the band's "fired-up, hooky guitar rock". In a staff review of the song by Idioteq, the review described "Myopic" as a song "which features their signature sound of hardcore aggression, melodic guitar leads, and sardonic lyrics delivered by vocalist Patrick Kindlon." They further said that "the track showcases the band’s ability to create music that is both outsider and inviting, cementing their status as one of the best modern guitar bands."

Andrew Sacher, writing for BrooklynVegan described "Myopic" as "classic Drug Church", further saying the song is "a mix of hardcore energy and alt-rock catchiness with wall-of-sound guitars and all the sharp lyrical wit you’d expect from Patrick Kindlon".
