= Paul Walker (album) =

Studio album by Drug Church
- Released: July 23, 2013
- Label: No Sleep

Drug Church chronology
Drug Church (2012)	Paul Walker (2013)	Hit Your Head (2015)

Singles from Paul Walker
- 1. "Clifton Country" Released: June 12, 2012

Paul Walker is the debut studio album by American post-hardcore band, Drug Church. The album was released on July 23, 2013 through No Sleep Records.

== Track listing ==
All tracks are written by Drug Church.

No.	Title	Length
1.	"Thinking About Joining Drug Church"	1:31
2.	"Reading YouTube Comments"	2:52
3.	"Clifton Country"	2:03
4.	"Shopping For a Belt"	2:33
5.	"Donny's Woods"	2:53
6.	"Learning To Speak British"	1:21
7.	"Attending a Cousin's Birthday Party"	4:10
8.	"Deconstructing Snapcase"	3:28
9.	"Thrill Hill"	3:34
10.	"Riding the Bus To Schenectady"	1:09

== Critical reception ==
Professional ratings
Aggregate scores
Source	Rating
Metacritic	75/100
Review scores
Source	Rating
Alternative Press	4/5 stars
Blurt	3/5 stars
Kerrang!	4/5 stars
Louder Than War	7.5/10
PopMatters	6/10
Punknews.org	4/5 stars
Rock Sound	8/10
Slug Magazine	4/5 stars

Paul Walker received positive reviews from contemporary music critics and journalists. On review aggregator website, Metacritic, Paul Walker has an average critic score of 75 out of 100, indicating "generally favorable reviews based on 6 Critic Reviews".

Scott Heisel, writing for Alternative Press, praising the album's musicianship, and generational bridging. Hiesel said that "to anyone younger than 25, Drug Church’s music will sound like the most awesome, most aggressive post-hardcore they’ve ever heard. To anyone older than 25, it’ll sound the same way, only we’ll appreciate it more since we were there in the ’90s for Snapcase, Helmet, Quicksand, Seaweed, Handsome, Fireside and other similarly sounding (and similarly syllabic) bands". Musically, Hiesel said that "the riffs are crunchy, the rhythm section is appropriately lumbering, the vocals are hoarsely yelled, and the lyrics are as matter-of-fact as the song titles. Drug Church will likely be off-putting for some with weaker aural constitutions, but if you can get over the fact that a skinny, weird-looking guy is yelling at you about nothing in particular, you’re gonna love this". Hiesel gave the album four stars out of five.

Joe Whyte, writing for Louder Than War gave Paul Walker a 7.5 out of 10 rating saying the album is "ten tracks [of] unrelenting moshpit of insanity although there is a clear melodic slant to some of the songs". Whyte summarized the album's grunge undertones saying that "while it’ll never be classed as pop music, it’s not a million miles away from Nirvana's Bleach material".

In a more mixed review, John B. Moore, writing for Blurt wrote a more sarcastic toned review saying "you know how cranky 40-something-year-old former punk rockers (now rocking the Dockers from their cubicles) take time out from updating their fantasy football leagues just long enough to rail about “real punk rock” versus today’s shitty pop bands masquerading as punk rock? Well they certainly aren’t talking about Drug Church". Moore said compared the band to likes of Quicksand and Jawbreaker, but saying that it's lyrically "a full dose of pessimism and cynicism, bordering on self-parody", and sarcastically said that while Paul Walker is "not for everyone", it "will at least get the 40-somethings to quit bitching about Green Day".

PopMatters writer, Julio Anta also gave a more mixed review of Paul Walker saying the album is "what you get when a group of post-recession hardcore kids, pissed off and fed up with the realities of millennial life, grow up, and take their craft beyond the pits of their local VFW halls and into the more technical and mature". Anta gave the album a 6 out of 10.
