= Station Fire (2009) =

2009 wildfire in Southern California

- Part of the 2009 California wildfires
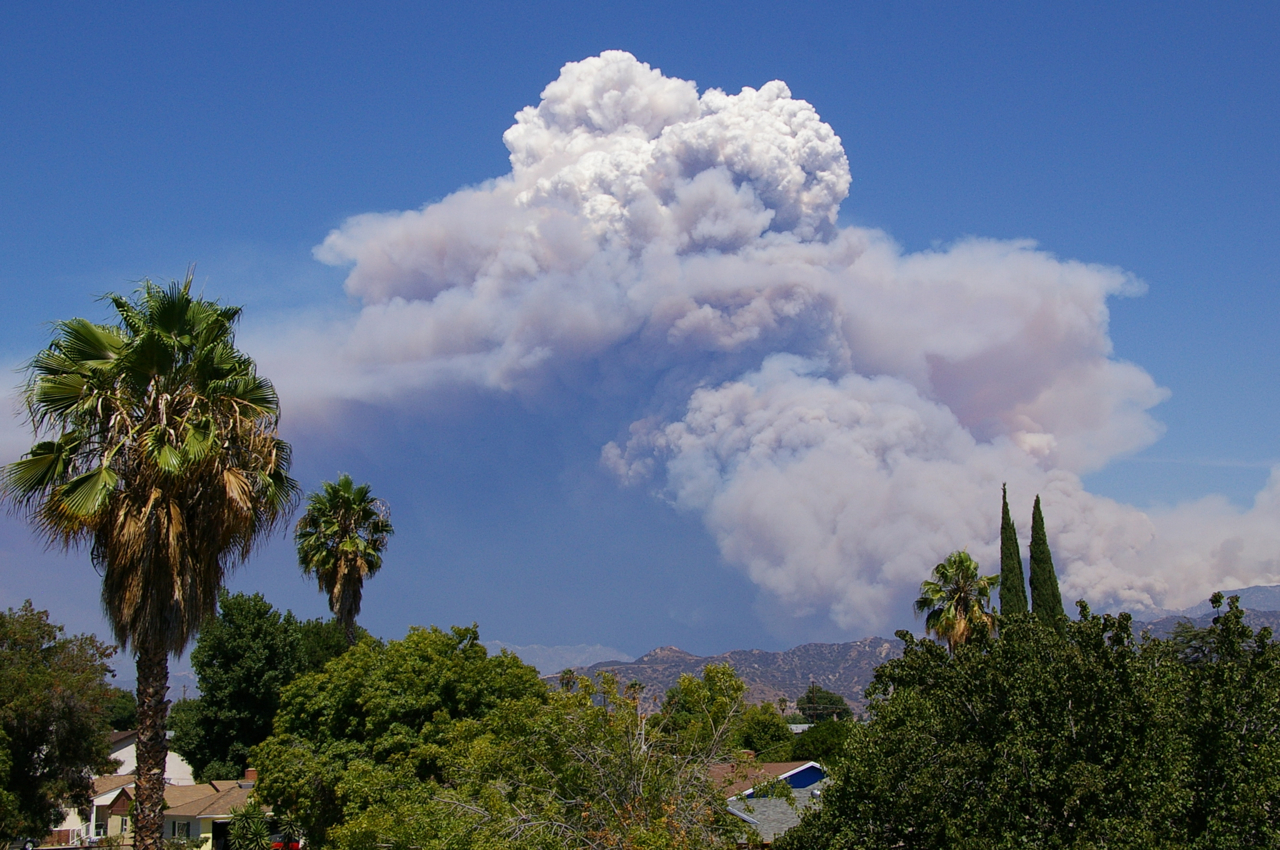
- Pyrocumulus cloud from the Station Fire, seen from North Hollywood
- Date: August 26, 2009 –; October 16, 2009
- Location: Angeles National Forest, Flintridge, California
- Coordinates: 34.251°N 118.195°W

Statistics
- Burned area: 160,577 acres (64,983 ha; 251 sq mi; 650 km^{2})

Impacts
- Deaths: 2 firefighters
- Structures lost: 89 residences; 120 other structures
- Cost: $94.7 million; (equivalent to about $134.2 million in 2024)

Ignition
- Cause: arson

Map
- Location within southern California

The Station Fire was the largest wildfire of the 2009 California wildfire season. It burned in the Angeles National Forest, igniting on August 26, 2009, near the U.S. Forest Service Angeles Station 11 ranger station on the Angeles Crest Highway, and burned through October 16. It threatened 12,000 structures in the National Forest and the nearby communities of La Cañada Flintridge, Pasadena, Glendale, Acton, La Crescenta, Juniper Hills, Littlerock and Altadena, as well as the Sunland and Tujunga neighborhoods of the City of Los Angeles. Many of these areas faced mandatory evacuations as the flames drew near, but as of September 6, all evacuation orders were lifted. The Station Fire burned on the slopes of Mount Wilson, threatening numerous television, radio and cellular telephone antennas on the summit, as well as the Mount Wilson Observatory, which includes several historically significant telescopes and multimillion-dollar astronomical facilities operated by UCLA, USC, UC Berkeley and Georgia State University.

== Progression ==
On August 30, two firefighters, Captain Tedmund Hall and Firefighter Specialist Arnie Quinones, died when their fire truck fell off a steep hillside near Los Angeles County Fire Department Camp 16 by Mt. Gleason during an attempt to set backfires. The two firefighters, supervisors of inmate fire crews (jointly operated by the Los Angeles County Fire Department and California Department of Corrections), had been conducting ignition operations in order to protect personnel and Mt Gleason Camp 16 from the advancing fire front. By September 15, the fire was 91% contained, with full containment expected by September 19. However, the Station Fire continued to persist into the month of October.

The Station Fire was 100% contained at 7:00 pm PST on Friday, October 16, 2009, due to moderate rainfall from a powerful storm system passing through. At 160,557-acre (251 mi^{2}; 650 km^{2}), the Station Fire was at the time the 9th largest wildfire in modern California history. It remains the largest wildfire in the modern history of Los Angeles County, when measured by burn area, surpassing the 105,000-acre (164 mi^{2}; 425 km^{2}) Clampitt Fire of September 1970.

The total cost of the firefighting effort amounted to $94.7 million.

== Cause ==
On September 3, officials announced that the Station Fire was caused by arson and that a homicide investigation had been initiated because of the deaths of the firefighters involved. Investigators discovered a substance at the fire's point of origin which they believe may have accelerated the flames.

== Effects ==
A 40-mile (64-kilometer) stretch of the Angeles Crest Highway was closed until 2010, due to guardrail and sign damage, although the pavement remained largely intact.

The U.S. Forest Service had banned night flights in wildfires after the death of a helicopter pilot in 1977. But as a result of the Station Fire, several California lawmakers led by Representative Adam Schiff successfully lobbied the U.S. Forest Service to end the ban on night flights, which they did in 2012.

== Gallery ==
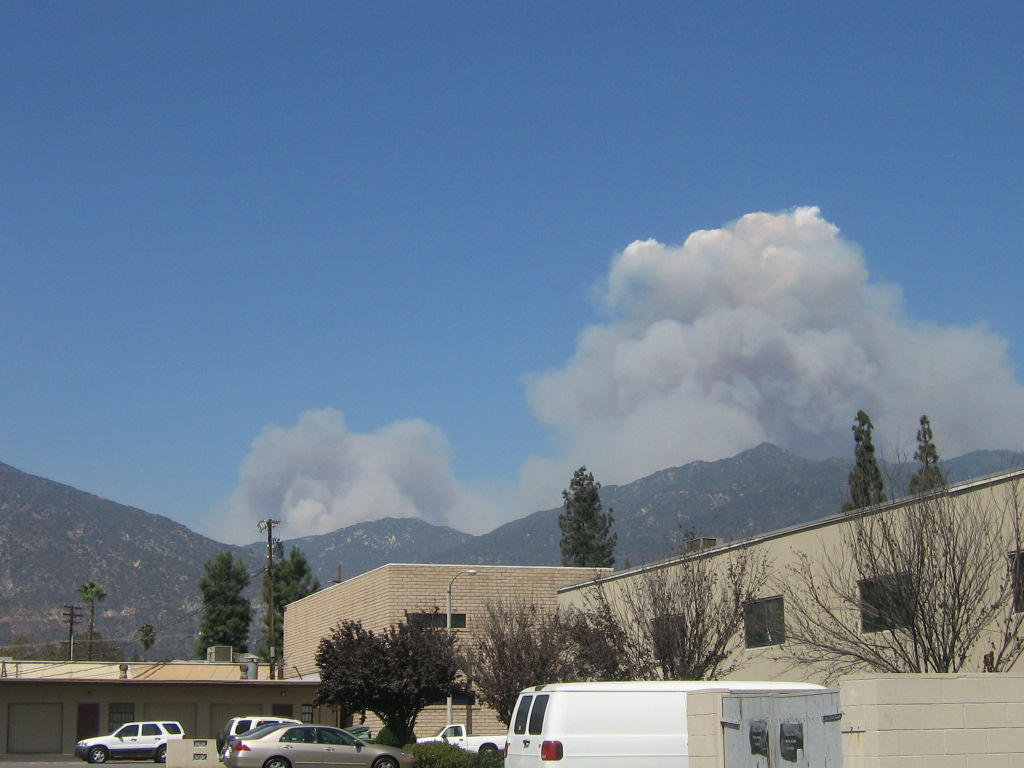
The Station Fire burning as seen from Arcadia, California.

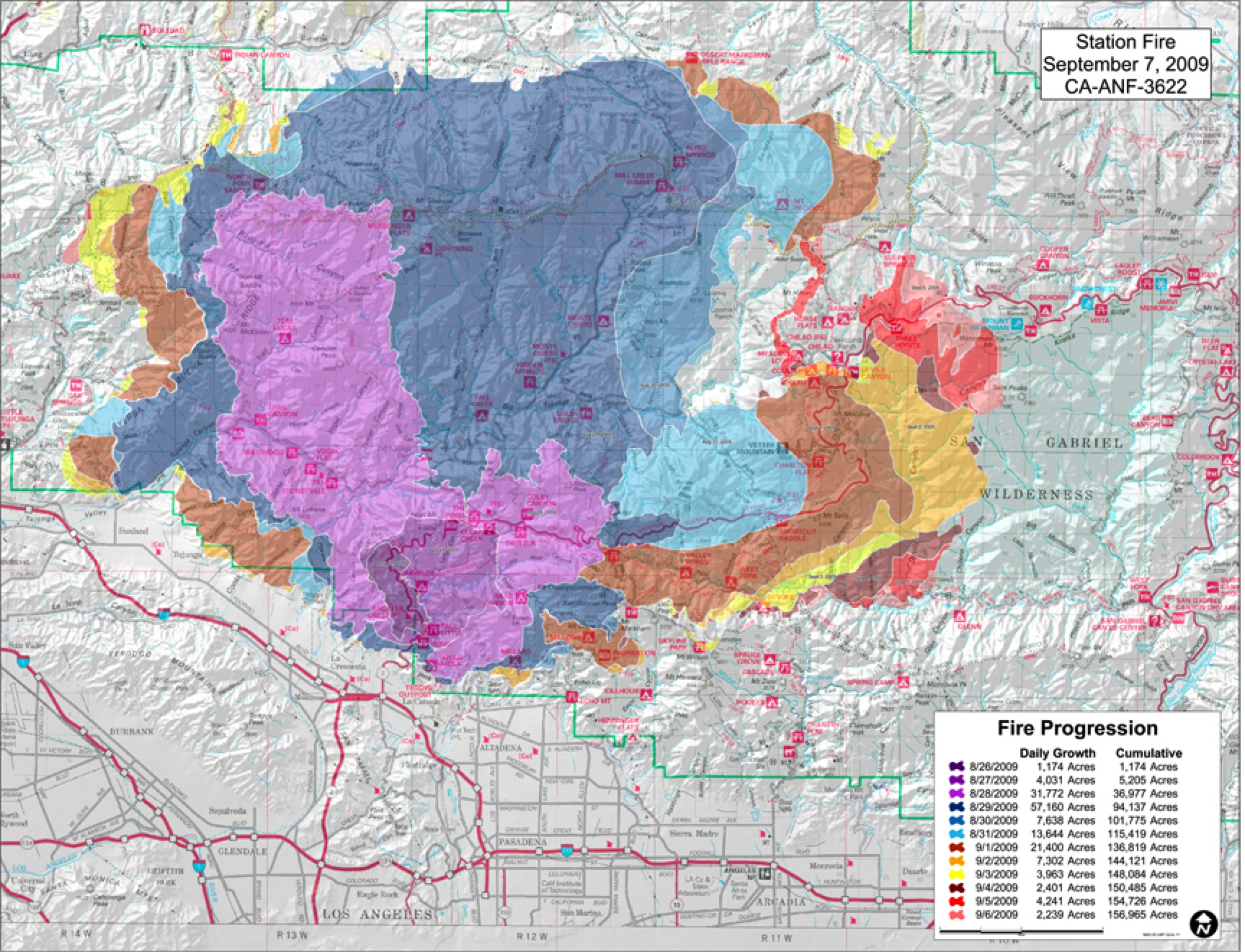
Progression of the Station Fire through September 4, 2009. Note the huge expansion on August 29. Map courtesy of the United States Forest Service.

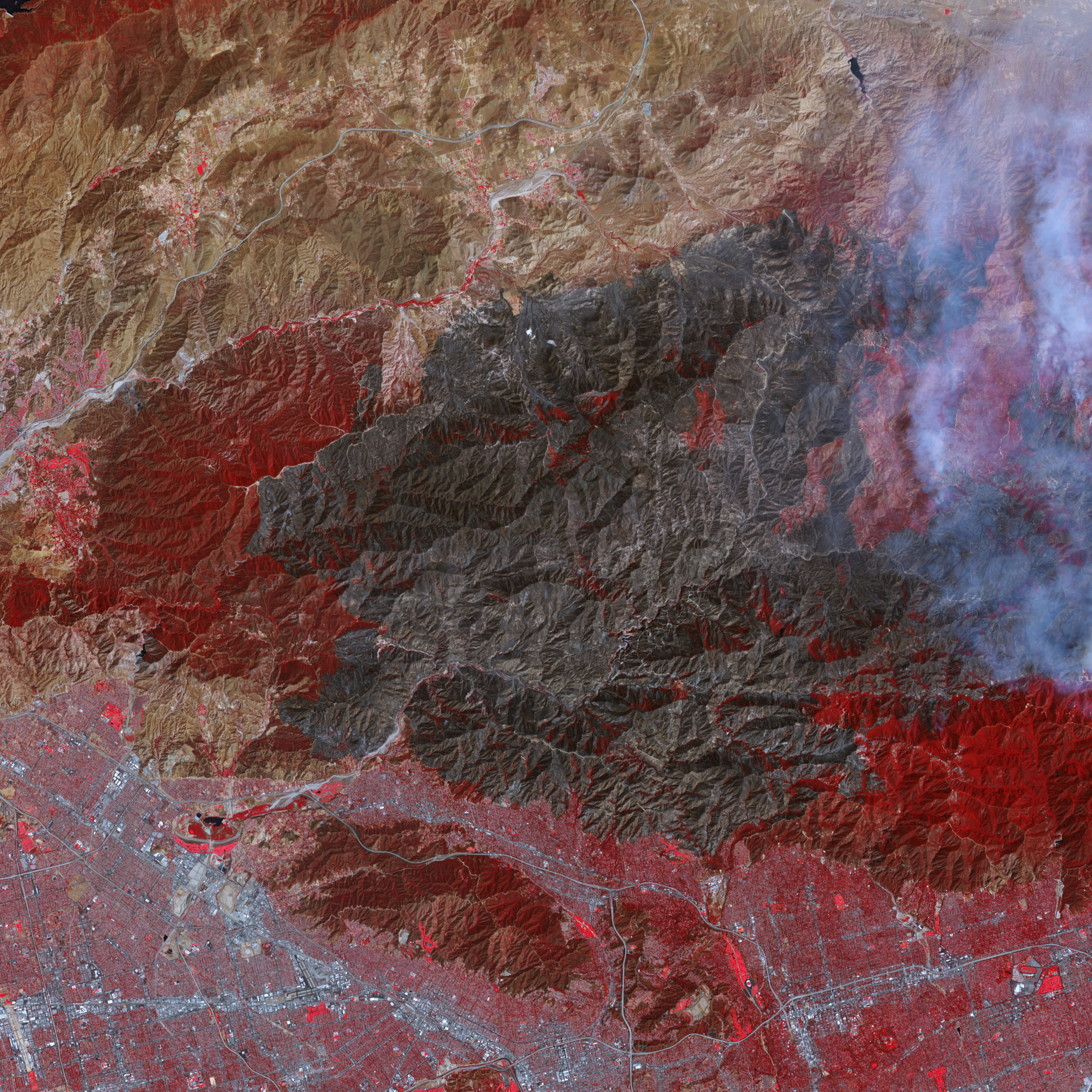
This near infra-red image shows the extent of the burned area from the Station Fire.

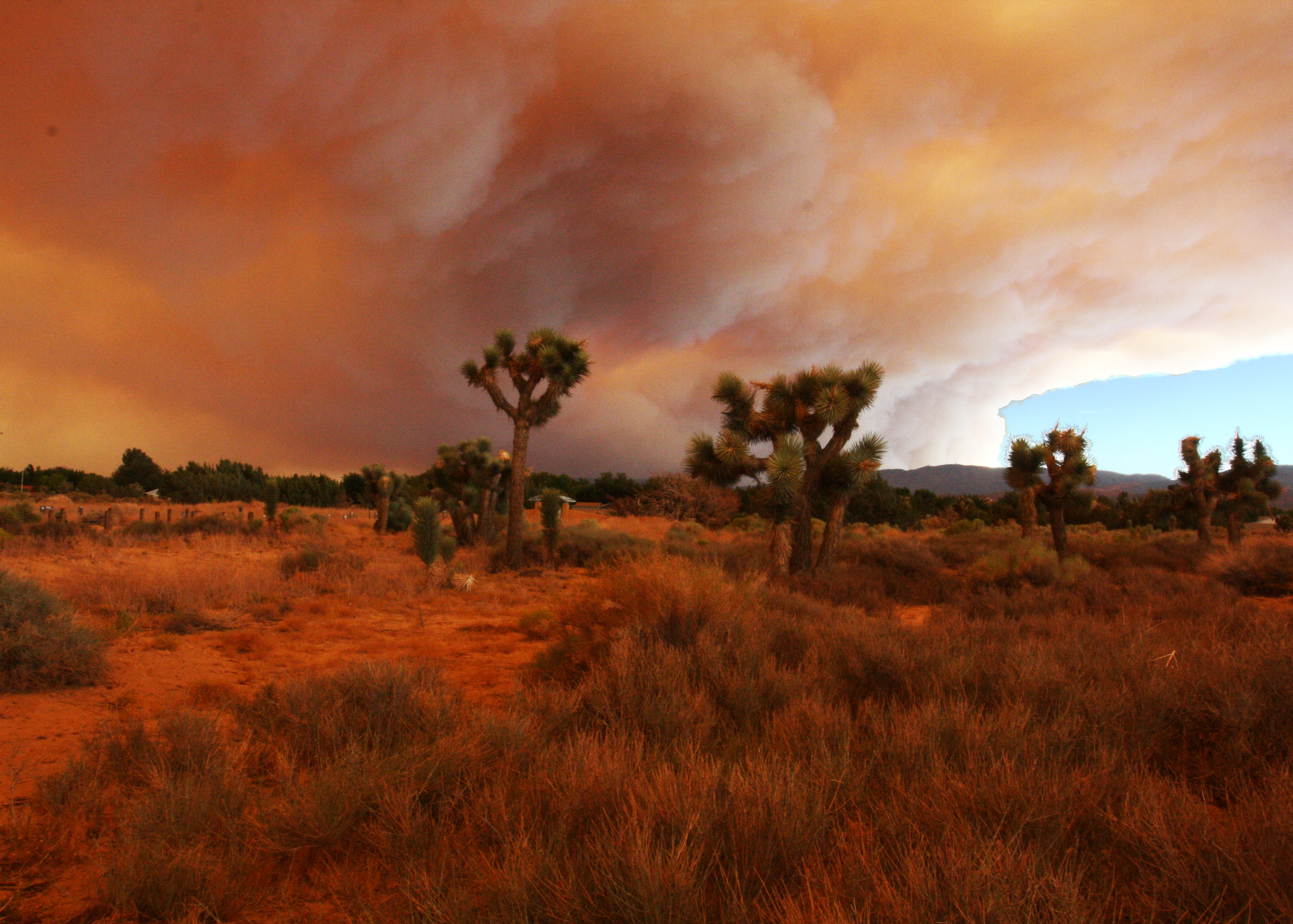
Smoke from fires as seen from the desert to the north.

== See also ==
- 2009 California wildfires
- October 2009 North American storm complex
- Bobcat Fire
