= Clampitt Fire =

1970 wildfire in southern California, US

The Clampitt Fire was an extremely large wildfire that broke out on September 25, 1970, in the Newhall area of the Santa Clarita Valley. It was the biggest wildfire in Los Angeles County history up to that point, burning 107,103 acres (43,343 ha), along with an additional 27,295 acres (11,046 ha) when it merged with the Wright Fire, a record that would stand until the Station Fire surpassed it in 2009. In total, 489 structures would be destroyed by both fires. The fire would be part of a Southern California firestorm that began in September 1970, along with the Wright Fire in Malibu and the Laguna Fire in San Diego County. The region saw 600,000 acres (240,000 ha) burned by the end of 1970.

== Progression ==
The Clampitt Fire broke out on September 25, 1970, in the Newhall area in then-unincorporated Los Angeles County. (The area would become part of the city of Santa Clarita when Newhall merged to incorporate it in 1987.) Due to downed power lines, extreme Santa Ana winds would then quickly spread the fire down to the Malibu coast within a day. At the peak of the emergency, there were 700 men on the fire lines, with assistance coming all over the state. The fire was originally dubbed by news reports as the "Chatsworth-Malibu Canyon fire" due to immense destruction coming from those areas. The fire then merged with the Wright Fire to burn an additional 27,295 acres. In total, 80 structures were lost, and four deaths occurred. The fire would also burn a large amount of acreage and numerous homes in present-day Agoura Hills, Porter Ranch, and near the former town of Santa Susana.

Notably, structures such as the entirety of movie sets of the Spahn Ranch in Chatsworth were destroyed in the fire.

== See also ==
- Woolsey Fire, a fire that also caused destruction in the Santa Susana Mountains and burned down to Malibu.
- 1978 Agoura-Malibu firestorm
- Palisades Fire, another fire that caused a large portion of Malibu to be destroyed
