= Hygiene (album) =

Studio album by Drug Church
- Released: March 11, 2022
- Recorded: August–October 2021
- Studios: The Barbershop, Hopatcong, New Jersey; Savaria Studios, Brooklyn; Balboa Recording, Los Angeles
- Genres: Post-hardcore; melodic hardcore; alternative rock; grunge
- Length: 26:09
- Label: Pure Noise
- Producer: Jon Markson

Drug Church chronology
| Tawny (2021) | Hygiene (2022) | Prude (2024) |

Singles from Hygiene
- 1. "Million Miles of Fun" Released: November 11, 2021; 2. "World Impact" Released: January 11, 2022; 3. "Premium Offer" Released: February 10, 2022

Hygiene is the fourth studio album by American post-hardcore band Drug Church. The album was released on March 11, 2022, through Pure Noise Records.

== Critical reception ==
Professional ratings
Aggregate scores
| Source | Rating |
|---|---|
| Metacritic | 82/100 |
Review scores
| Source | Rating |
| The A.V. Club | B |
| Kerrang! | 4/5 |
| Noizze | 9/10 |
| Pitchfork | 7.4/10 |
| PopMatters | 9/10 |

Hygiene received widespread critical acclaim upon its release. On review aggregator website, Metacritic, Hygiene has an average critic score of 82 out of 100, indicating "universal acclaim based on four critic reviews". Paul Travers writing for British publication Kerrang! gave Hygiene a four out of five-star rating, saying that the album is "as addictively seductive as ever and listening to Hygiene might just be one of the most satisfying things you can do in less than half an hour."

Pitchfork writer, Brad Sanders, awarded Hygiene a 7.4 out of 10 calling it an album "filled with pithy one-liners and gigantic hooks". Sanders compared the album to Turnstile, and specifically their 2021 album Glow On album as far accessibility hardcore music, but more specifically, Sanders said of Hygiene that it "is mired in modern, adult anxieties—the financial pressures of making a living doing what you love, the tough questions that lead to a coherent political view, the complicated friendships that require reexamination. It’s an intimacy built on commiseration rather than communal joy: Drug Church want you to know that they’re in the muck, too, trying to figure it out."

In a positive, but slightly more mixed review, Alex McLevy of The A.V. Club summarized Hygiene called the album "a record wholly unconcerned about how derivative it sounds" and as "reimagined 90s alternative rock, with a hardcore edge". McLevy further described Hygiene as "a formula" with "the most overdriven and anthemic elements of grunge, apply a killer hook, and pour on singer Patrick Kindlon’s exhortatory, provocative hardcore vocals."

== Track listing ==
All tracks are written by Drug Church.

Hygiene track listing
| No. | Title | Length |
|---|---|---|
| 1. | "Fun's Over" | 1:52 |
| 2. | "Super Saturated" | 2:25 |
| 3. | "Plucked" | 2:44 |
| 4. | "Million Miles of Fun" | 2:10 |
| 5. | "Detective Lieutenant" | 3:26 |
| 6. | "Tiresome" | 3:05 |
| 7. | "World Impact" | 2:06 |
| 8. | "Premium Offer" | 2:53 |
| 9. | "Piss & Quiet" | 1:30 |
| 10. | "Athlete on Bench" | 3:58 |
| Total length: | | 26:09 |

Japanese edition bonus tracks
| No. | Title | Length |
|---|---|---|
| 11. | "Head-Off" | 3:05 |
| 12. | "Tawny" | 3:26 |
| 13. | "Bliss Out" | 1:53 |
| 14. | "Remember to Forget" (Arcwelder cover) | 2:56 |
| Total length: | | 37:29 |

== Personnel ==
Drug Church

- Nick Cogan - electric guitar
- Cory Galusha - electric guitar
- Patrick Kindlon - vocals
- Chris Villeneuve - drums
- Patrick Wynne - bass

Additional personnel

- Anne Elisabeth Grushecky - design
- Mike Kalajian - mastering
- Jon Markson - producing, recording, mixing
- Alex Salter - engineering
- Mitchell Wojcik - photography

== Charts ==
Chart performance for Hygiene
| Chart (2022) | Peak position |
|---|---|
| Scottish Albums (Official Charts) | 71 |
| UK Independent Albums (Official Charts) | 19 |
| UK Rock & Metal Albums (Official Charts) | 10 |
| US Heatseekers Albums (Billboard) | 8 |
