= Juniper Hills, California =

Unincorporated community in California, United States

- Unincorporated community
- Location within Los Angeles County

- Location within the state of California Juniper Hills, California (the United States)
- Coordinates: 34°26′39″N 117°56′7″W
- Country: United States
- State: California
- County: Los Angeles
- Time zone: UTC-8 (Pacific (PST))
  - Summer (DST): UTC-7 (PDT)
- ZIP codes: 93543
- Area code: 661

Juniper Hills is an unincorporated community located in the foothills on the northern slope of the San Gabriel Mountains, facing the Antelope Valley, in Los Angeles County, California, United States. The community is situated south and upslope from Littlerock and Pearblossom. The Devil's Punchbowl County Park is located on the eastern side of the community at the end of Los Angeles County Route N6. The Juniper Hills Community Association was created in 1948 and maintains a community center. The Juniper Hills Town Council, established by the residents in 2003, serves as a forum for issues, but does not govern. On June 26, 2007, the Los Angeles County Board of Supervisors approved the Juniper Hills Community Standards District to institute rural land use rules specific to the community. Postal service to the community is spread across portions of three ZIP codes: 93543, 93553 and 93563; and is served by area code 661.

== History ==
=== Wildfire Evacuation (2009) ===
The Los Angeles County Fire Department placed a mandatory evacuations for parts of Juniper Hills on August 31, 2009 when the Station Fire remained uncontrolled and threatened to burn for another week. All homes in the Juniper Hills area north of Juniper Hills Rd between Emma Rd, Fort Tejon Rd and Longview Rd received mandatory evacuation orders.

=== The Bobcat Fire (2020) ===
The Bobcat Fire started on September 6, 2020 in triple-digit temperatures near the Cogswell Dam and the West Fork Day Use area. The fire burned through thick vegetation and dry brush in steep terrain, some of which had not burned in more 60 years. Homes in Juniper Hills were reported to have been burned. Evacuations were ordered on September 20, 2020.
